= List of bridges in South Korea =

This is a list of bridges and viaducts in South Korea, including those for pedestrians and vehicular traffic.

== Historical and architectural interest bridges ==
	Name	Korean	Distinction	Length	Type	Carries Crosses	Opened	Location	Province	Ref.
1	Geumcheon Bridge	금천교	Oldest bridge of Seoul; National treasure n°1762 Changdeokgung Palace; World Heritage Site (1997)	12.9 m (42 ft)	Masonry; 2 arches	Footbridge	1411	Seoul; Jongno; 37°34′42.4″N 126°59′24.2″E	Seoul	
2	Supyo Bridge	수표교		27.5 m (90 ft)	Beam; Stone slabs, 10 spans	Footbridge; Cheonggyecheon	1420	Seoul; Jung; 37°33′29.2″N 127°00′17.9″E	Seoul	
3	Okcheongyo Bridge	창경궁 옥천교	National treasure n°386	9.8 m (32 ft)	Masonry; 2 arches	Footbridge	1483	Seoul; Jongno; 37°34′43.7″N 126°59′45.7″E	Seoul	
4	Rainbow Bridge of Heungguksa Temple	여수 흥국사 홍교	National treasure n°563		Masonry; 1 arch	Footbridge	1639	Yeosu; 34°49′22.0″N 127°41′49.1″E	South Jeolla	
5	Neungpagyo Bridge	고성 건봉사 능파교	National treasure n°1336	14.3 m (47 ft)	Masonry; 1 arch	Footbridge	1707	Geonbongsa; 38°24′09.2″N 128°22′42.5″E	Gangwon	
6	Beolgyo Bridge	보성 벌교 홍교	National treasure n°304	27.6 m (91 ft)	Masonry; 3 arches	Footbridge; Beolgyo	1729	Beolgyo; 34°51′00.1″N 127°20′18.4″E	South Jeolla	
7	Mannyeon Bridge	창녕 영산 만년교	National treasure n°564	11 m (36 ft)	Masonry; 1 arch	Footbridge	1780	Yeongsan; 35°27′13.1″N 128°31′47.4″E	South Gyeongsang	
8	Manan Bridge	만안교			Masonry; 7 arches	Footbridge	1795	Anyang; 37°24′52.0″N 126°54′42.6″E	Gyeonggi	
9	Yuksongjeong Honggyo Bridge	고성 건봉사 능파교	National treasure n°1337	10.6 m (35 ft)	Masonry; 1 arch	Footbridge	18th century	Goseong County; 38°23′11.9″N 128°23′54.3″E	Gangwon	
10	Bridge of No Return	돌아올 수 없는 다리	Military Demarcation Line		Beam; Concrete	Sachon		Paju - Kaesong; 37°57′21.8″N 126°40′13.1″E	Gyeonggi; Democratic People's Republic of Korea	
11	Bridge of Freedom (Paju)	자유의 다리		83 m (272 ft)	Beam; Steel, wood	Footbridge; Imjingak	1953	Paju; 37°53′23.6″N 126°44′19.6″E	Gyeonggi	
12	Banpo Bridge	반포대교	Longest bridge fountain in the world	1,495 m (4,905 ft)	Box girder Steel; 2 levels	Road bridge Banpo-daero; Han River	1982	Seoul; Seocho - Yongsan; 37°30′56.0″N 126°59′46.1″E	Seoul	(Note: The Banpo Grand Bridge is built over the Jamsu bridge (반포 대교, 1976) and has formed a two-level bridge since 1982. The upper level is equipped with 570 m (1,870 ft) fountains on each bank, a total length of 1,140 m (3,740 ft).)
13	Seonim Bridge	선임교	Jeju Volcanic Island and Lava Tubes; World Heritage Site (2007)	128 m (420 ft)	Arch; Steel deck arch	Footbridge; Cheonjeyeon Waterfalls	1984	Seogwipo; 33°15′06.3″N 126°25′00.7″E	Jeju	
14	Seonyu Footbridge	선유교	Conception by Rudy Ricciotti; The arch is made of ductal, an ultra-high performance fiber concrete Span : 120 m (390 ft)	469 m (1,539 ft)	Arch; Concrete deck arch	Footbridge; Han River	2002	Seoul; Yeongdeungpo; 37°32′36.5″N 126°53′49.0″E	Seoul	
15	Wolchulsan Bridge	구름다리	Span : 50 m (160 ft); Height : 70 m (230 ft)	50 m (160 ft)	Suspension; Steel	Footbridge	2005	Yeongam County; 34°46′08.5″N 126°42′44.0″E	South Jeolla	
16	Jincheon Nongdari Bridge	진천 농다리리	Oldest stone bridge in South Korea; Length : 93.6 m (307 ft)	3.6 m (12 ft)	Stone bridge	Footbridge	Goryeo era	North Chungcheong; 36°49′33″N 127°29′36″E	North Chungcheong	
17	Salgot Bridge	구름다리	Oldest stone bridge in Seoul length : 76 m (249 ft)	6 m (20 ft)	Stone Bridge	Footbridge	1420	Seoul; 37°33′12″N 127°2′47″E	Seoul	

== Major road and railway bridges ==
This table presents the structures with spans greater than 200 meters (non-exhaustive list).

	Name	Korean	Span	Length	Type	Carries Crosses	Opened	Location	Province	Ref.
1	Yi Sun-sin Bridge	이순신대교	1,545 m (5,069 ft)	2,260 m (7,410 ft)	Suspension; Steel box girder deck, concrete pylons 357+1545+357	Road bridge Isunsin-daero; Sea of Japan	2012	Gwangyang - Myodo Island; 34°54′22.1″N 127°42′17.7″E	South Jeolla	(Note: The length given only takes into account the main bridge, central span(s) and shore span(s), approach viaducts are not counted.)
2	Ulsan Bridge	울산대교	1,150 m (3,770 ft)	2,970 m (9,740 ft)	Suspension; Steel box girder deck, concrete pylons	Road bridge Taehwa River	2015	Ulsan; 35°30′42.8″N 129°23′27.3″E	Ulsan	
3	Noryang Bridge	제2남해대교	890 m (2,920 ft)	990 m (3,250 ft)	Suspension; Steel box girder deck, concrete pylons	National Route 19; Sea of Japan	2018	Noryang; 34°56′35.8″N 127°52′01.7″E	South Gyeongsang	
4	Paryeong Bridge	팔영대교	850 m (2,790 ft)	1,340 m (4,400 ft)	Suspension; Steel box girder deck, concrete pylons 4x65+850+3x60	National Route 77; Sea of Japan	2016	Ucheon - Jeokgeum Island; 34°37′53.6″N 127°30′10.8″E	South Jeolla	
5	Incheon Bridge	인천대교	800 m (2,600 ft)	12,340 m (40,490 ft)	Cable-stayed; Steel box girder deck, concrete pylons 80+260+800+260+80	Second Gyeongin Expressway; Yellow Sea	2009	Incheon - Yeongjongdo; 37°24′50.8″N 126°33′58.2″E	Incheon	
6	Second Cheonsa Bridge	새천년대교	650 m (2,130 ft) (x2)	7,224 m (23,701 ft)	Suspension; Steel box girder deck, 3 concrete pylons 225+650+650+225	National Route 2 Yellow Sea	2019	Amtae Island - Aphae Island; 34°51′37.8″N 126°12′20.5″E	South Jeolla	
7	Cheongna Haneul Bridge	청라하늘대교	560 m (1,840 ft)	4,680 m (15,350 ft)	Cable-stayed; Concrete pylons	Road bridge Yellow Sea	2026	Incheon - Yeongjongdo; 37°30′52.6″N 126°35′48.2″E	Incheon	
8	Busan Harbor Bridge	북항대교	540 m (1,770 ft)	3,368 m (11,050 ft)	Cable-stayed; Composite steel/concrete deck, concrete pylons 60+227+540+227+60	Road bridge Sea of Japan	2014	Busan - Yeongdo District; 35°06′21.5″N 129°03′52.6″E	Busan	
9	Godeok-Topyeong Bridge	고덕토평대교	540 m (1,770 ft)	1,725 m (5,659 ft)	Cable-stayed; Concrete box girder deck, concrete pylons 230+540+230	Sejong–Pocheon Expressway; Han River	2025	Seoul - Guri; 37°34′17.6″N 127°08′57.3″E	Seoul; Gyeonggi	
10	First Cheonsa Bridge	새천년대교	510 m (1,670 ft)	7,224 m (23,701 ft)	Cable-stayed; Asymmetric, steel box girder deck, concrete pylons 120+120+510+120	National Route 2 Yellow Sea	2019	Amtae Island - Aphae Island; 34°51′38.6″N 126°10′17.7″E	South Jeolla	
11	Gwangan Bridge	광안대교	500 m (1,600 ft)	7,420 m (24,340 ft)	Suspension; 2 levels steel truss deck, steel pylons 200+500+200	Busan Metropolitan City Route 66; Sea of Japan	2002	Busan; 35°08′45.4″N 129°07′41.5″E	Busan	
12	Mokpo Bridge	목포대교	500 m (1,600 ft)	3,060 m (10,040 ft)	Cable-stayed; Steel box girder deck, concrete pylons 200+500+200	National Route 1 Yeongsan River; Yellow Sea	2012	Mokpo; 34°47′20.6″N 126°21′20.4″E	South Jeolla	
13	Hwatae Island Bridge	화태대교	500 m (1,600 ft)	1,345 m (4,413 ft)	Cable-stayed; Steel box girder deck, steel pylons 71+189+500+189+71	Road bridge Sea of Japan	2015	Yeosu - Hwatae Island; 34°35′54.2″N 127°44′07.2″E	South Jeolla	
14	Hwayang-Jobal Bridge	화양조발대교	500 m (1,600 ft)	854 m (2,802 ft)	Cable-stayed; Concrete box girder deck, concrete pylons 177+500+177	National Route 77; Sea of Japan	2020	Jobaldo Island - Jangsu-ri; 34°38′04.6″N 127°34′18.6″E	South Jeolla	
15	Geogum Bridge	거금대교	480 m (1,570 ft)	2,028 m (6,654 ft)	Cable-stayed; Steel truss deck, concrete pylons 120+198+480+198+120	National Route 27; East China Sea	2011	Goheung County; 34°30′08.0″N 127°07′43.3″E	South Jeolla	
16	First Busan–Geoje Bridge	I거가 대교	475 m (1,558 ft)	1,870 m (6,140 ft)	Cable-stayed; Composite steel/concrete deck, concrete pylons 222+475+222	National Route 58; Sea of Japan	2010	Busan - Geoje; 35°00′54.8″N 128°45′14.9″E	Busan; South Gyeongsang	
17	Seohae Bridge	서해대교	470 m (1,540 ft)	7,310 m (23,980 ft)	Cable-stayed; Composite steel/concrete deck, concrete pylons 60+200+470+200+60	Seohaean Expressway; Asan Bay (Yellow Sea)	2000	Pyeongtaek - Dangjin; 36°57′05.6″N 126°50′27.5″E	Gyeonggi; South Chungcheong	
18	Myo Island Bridge	묘도대교	430 m (1,410 ft)	1,410 m (4,630 ft)	Cable-stayed; Composite steel/concrete deck, concrete pylons 60+105+430+105+60	Road bridge Isunsin-daero; Sea of Japan	2012	Gwangyang - Myo Island; 34°51′59.0″N 127°43′10.1″E	South Jeolla	
19	First Imja Bridge	임자1대교	410 m (1,350 ft)	750 m (2,460 ft)	Cable-stayed; Composite steel/concrete deck, concrete pylons 170+410+170	National Route 24; Yellow Sea	2020	Imja-myeon; 35°05′10.4″N 126°07′34.6″E	South Jeolla	
20	Namhae Bridge	남해대교	404 m (1,325 ft)	660 m (2,170 ft)	Suspension; Steel box girder deck, steel pylons 128+404+128	National Route 19; Sea of Japan	1973	Noryang; 34°56′39.5″N 127°52′19.0″E	South Gyeongsang	
21	Machang Bridge	마창대교	400 m (1,300 ft)	1,700 m (5,600 ft)	Cable-stayed; Composite steel/concrete deck, concrete pylons 170+400+170	National Route 2 Sea of Japan	2008	Masan - Changwon; 35°09′48.4″N 128°35′40.0″E	South Gyeongsang	
22	Gogunsan Bridge	고군산대교	400 m (1,300 ft)	705 m (2,313 ft)	Suspension; Steel box girder deck, concrete pylon	Road bridge Yellow Sea	2016	Shinsido Island - Munyeodo Island; 35°48′42.7″N 126°26′33.4″E	North Jeolla	
23	Dongi Bridge	동이대교	400 m (1,300 ft)	500 m (1,600 ft)	Cable-stayed; Composite steel/concrete deck, concrete pylons 75+400+75	National Route 37; Imjin River	2016	Misan-myeon - Gunnam-myeon; 38°01′00.7″N 127°00′53.2″E	Gyeonggi	
24	Jindo Bridge	진도대교	344 m (1,129 ft)	485 m (1,591 ft)	Cable-stayed; Steel box girder deck, steel pylons 70+344+70; Twin bridges	National Route 18; East China Sea	1983; 2004	Jindo County; 34°34′19.0″N 126°18′18.2″E	South Jeolla	
25	Cheong poong bridge	청풍대교	327 m (1,073 ft)	442 m (1,450 ft)	Cable-stayed; Steel girder deck, concrete pylons 22+35+327+35+22	Cheongpungho-ro 82; Namhan River; Chungju Dam reservoir	2010	Jecheon; 37°00′12.7″N 128°10′45.8″E	North Chungcheong	
26	Chilsan Bridge	칠산대교	320 m (1,050 ft)	590 m (1,940 ft)	Cable-stayed; Concrete box girder deck, concrete pylons 135+320+135	National Route 77	2016	Yeonggwang County; 35°22′00.7″N 126°25′12.8″E	South Jeolla	
27	Second Imja Bridge	임자2대교	310 m (1,020 ft)	1,135 m (3,724 ft)	Cable-stayed; Composite steel/concrete deck, concrete pylons 130+310+130	National Route 24; Yellow Sea	2020	Imja-myeon - Jido-eup; 35°05′11.8″N 126°09′07.0″E	South Jeolla	
28	Yeongjong Bridge	영종대교	300 m (980 ft)	4,420 m (14,500 ft)	Suspension; Self-anchored, 2 levels steel truss deck, steel pylons 125+300+125	Incheon International Airport Expressway; AREX; Yellow Sea	2000	Incheon - Yeongjongdo; 37°32′41.6″N 126°34′57.8″E	Incheon	
29	Samdo Bridge	삼도대교	290 m (950 ft)	550 m (1,800 ft)	Cable-stayed; Concrete deck, concrete pylons 130+290+130	National Route 2 Yellow Sea	2017	Haui-myeon - Sinui-myeon; 34°33′59.9″N 126°03′07.0″E	South Jeolla	
30	Dolsan Bridge	돌산대교	280 m (920 ft)	450 m (1,480 ft)	Cable-stayed; Steel box girder deck, steel pylons 85+280+85	National Route 17; Sea of Japan	1985	Yeosu; 34°43′51.1″N 127°44′04.3″E	South Jeolla	
31	Saryang Bridge	사량대교	280 m (920 ft)	530 m (1,740 ft)	Cable-stayed; Concrete deck, concrete pylons 125+280+125	Road bridge Sea of Japan	2015	Saryang-myeon; 34°50′24.9″N 128°13′46.0″E	South Gyeongsang	
32	Cheongna Haneul Bridge (secondary bridge)	청라하늘대교	280 m (920 ft)	4,680 m (15,350 ft)	Cable-stayed; Concrete pylons	Road bridge Yellow Sea	2026	Incheon - Yeongjongdo; 37°30′43.2″N 126°35′26.4″E	Incheon	
33	Daedong Hwamyeong Bridge	대동화명대교	270 m (890 ft)	1,039 m (3,409 ft)	Cable-stayed; Concrete box girder deck, concrete pylons 115+270+115	Busan Metropolitan City Route 77; Nakdong River	2012	Busan - Gimhae; 35°14′07.6″N 128°59′54.6″E	Busan; South Gyeongsang	
34	Jara Bridge	자라대교	255 m (837 ft) (x2)	670 m (2,200 ft)	Cable-stayed; Concrete deck, concrete pylon 80+255+255+80	Local Route 805; Yellow Sea	2019	Anjwa-myeon; 34°41′59.6″N 126°10′41.3″E	South Jeolla	
35	Sorok Bridge	소록대교	250 m (820 ft)	1,160 m (3,810 ft)	Suspension; Self-anchored, 2 levels steel box girder deck, concrete pylons 110+250+110	National Route 27; East China Sea	2009	Goheung County; 34°31′36.9″N 127°07′21.9″E	South Jeolla	
36	Yeonggwang Bridge	영광대교	250 m (820 ft)	1,820 m (5,970 ft)	Cable-stayed; Concrete box girder deck, concrete pylons 110+250+110	National Route 77; Yellow Sea	2019	Yeonggwang County; 35°09′48.8″N 126°21′15.5″E	South Jeolla	
37	Fourth Geumgang Bridge	금강4교	250 m (820 ft)	840 m (2,760 ft)	Cable-stayed; Asymmetric, concrete box girder deck, concrete pylons 140+250+70	Road bridge Geum River	2016	Sejong City; 36°30′42.7″N 127°19′47.5″E	Sejong	
38	Yeongheung Grand Bridge	영흥대교	240 m (790 ft)	1,250 m (4,100 ft)	Cable-stayed; Steel box girder deck, concrete pylons 110+240+110	Road bridge Yeongheung-ro; Yellow Sea	2001	Yeongheungdo - Seonjae-do; 37°15′16.6″N 126°30′22.9″E	Gyeonggi	
39	Geomun Bridge	거문대교	240 m (790 ft)	530 m (1,740 ft)	Cable-stayed; Concrete deck, concrete pylons 145+240+145	Road bridge Sea of Japan	2015	Port Hamilton; 34°03′23.6″N 127°18′06.0″E	South Jeolla	
40	Wonsan Anmyeon Bridge	원산안면대교	240 m (790 ft)	1,750 m (5,740 ft)	Cable-stayed; Composite steel/concrete deck, concrete pylons 105+240+105	National Route 77; Yellow Sea	2019	Gonam-myeon - Ocheon-myeon; 36°23′35.7″N 126°25′24.7″E	South Chungcheong	
41	Samcheonpo Bridge	삼천포대교	230 m (750 ft)	1,073 m (3,520 ft)	Cable-stayed; Composite steel/concrete deck, concrete pylons 103+230+103	National Route 3 Sea of Japan	2003	Sacheon; 34°55′42.7″N 128°03′01.3″E	South Gyeongsang	
42	Second Busan–Geoje Bridge	II거가 대교	230 m (750 ft) (x2)	1,650 m (5,410 ft)	Cable-stayed; Composite steel/concrete deck, 3 concrete pylons 108+230+230+108	National Route 58; Sea of Japan	2010	Busan - Geoje; 35°01′03.5″N 128°43′42.7″E	Busan; South Gyeongsang	
43	Geobukseon Bridge	거북선대교	230 m (750 ft)	744 m (2,441 ft)	Cable-stayed; Concrete girder deck, concrete pylons 35+82+230+82+35	National Route 17; Sea of Japan	2012	Yeosu; 34°44′06.9″N 127°44′55.6″E	South Jeolla	
44	Bitgaram Bridge	빛가람대교	225 m (738 ft)	660 m (2,170 ft)	Cable-stayed; Composite steel/concrete deck, concrete pylons	Road bridge Yeongsan River	2013	Naju; 35°00′57.6″N 126°44′14.7″E	South Jeolla	
45	Sepung Bridge	세풍대교	220 m (720 ft) (x2)	725 m (2,379 ft)	Cable-stayed; Curved concrete box girder deck, 3 concrete pylons 85+220+220+85	Road bridge	2014	Gwangyang; 34°56′11.2″N 127°36′14.7″E	South Jeolla	
46	Jangbogo Bridge	장보고대교	220 m (720 ft)	1,305 m (4,281 ft)	Cable-stayed; Composite steel/concrete deck, concrete pylons 90+220+90	National Route 77; Sea of Japan	2017	Gogeumdo - Sinjido; 34°20′54.7″N 126°46′57.8″E	South Jeolla	
47	Baekseok Bridge	백석대교	205 m (673 ft)	749 m (2,457 ft)	Cable-stayed; Concrete box girder deck, concrete pylons 77+205+77	Road bridge Bongsu-daero; Ara Canal	2012	Incheon; 37°34′19.8″N 126°39′49.0″E	Incheon	
48	Ando Bridge	안도대교	200 m (660 ft)	360 m (1,180 ft)	Extradosed; Concrete box girder deck, concrete pylons 80+200+80	Local Route 863; Sea of Japan	2010	Geumodo; 34°29′31.1″N 127°47′48.7″E	South Jeolla	
49	Handuri Bridge	한두리대교	200 m (660 ft)	880 m (2,890 ft)	Cable-stayed; Composite steel/concrete deck, concrete pylon 200+140	Road-bridge; Hannuri-daero; Geum River	2012	Daejeon - Sejong City; 36°28′32.0″N 127°15′57.3″E	Daejeon; Sejong	
50	Wando Bridge	완도대교	200 m (660 ft)	500 m (1,600 ft)	Cable-stayed; Steel box girder deck, steel pylon 200+140	National Route 13 National Route 77; Sea of Japan	2012	Cheongghaejil Island - Wando County; 34°23′39.1″N 126°38′46.9″E	South Jeolla	
51	Kim Si-min Bridge	김시민대교	200 m (660 ft)		Cable-stayed; Concrete deck, concrete pylon	Road bridge Nam River	2015	Jinju; 35°10′34.6″N 128°07′54.8″E	South Gyeongsang	
52	Dunbyeong Bridge	둔병대교	200 m (660 ft)	990 m (3,250 ft)	Cable-stayed; Concrete box girder deck, concrete pylon 2x150+200+170+140	National Route 77; Sea of Japan	2017	Dunbyeongdo Island - Jobaldo Island; 34°37′49.2″N 127°33′17.5″E	South Jeolla	

== Han River bridges in Seoul ==
This list present all bridges from the mouth of the Han River to the end of Seoul Special City.

	Name	Korean	Span	Length	Type	Carries Crosses	Opened	Location	Province	Ref.
1	Ilsan Bridge	일산대교	110 m (360 ft) (x2)	1,840 m (6,040 ft)	Beam; Steel; 7x70+2x110+7x70	Local Route 98; Han River	2007	Gimpo - Goyang; 37°39′03.5″N 126°43′00.4″E	Gyeonggi	
2	Gimpo Bridge	김포대교	125 m (410 ft) (x6)	2,280 m (7,480 ft)	Box girder Prestressed concrete	Seoul Ring Expressway; Han River	1997	Gimpo - Goyang; 37°36′45.1″N 126°47′38.5″E	Gyeonggi	
3	Second Haengju Bridge	행주대교	120 m (390 ft)	1,460 m (4,790 ft)	Cable-stayed; Steel box girder deck, concrete pylons 60+2x50+120+2x50	National Route 39 Local Route 78; Han River	1995; 2000	Goyang; Seoul; Gangseo; 37°35′57.6″N 126°48′38.5″E	Gyeonggi; Seoul	(Note: The first Haengju Bridge (main span: composite steel girder) was completed in 1978 and dismantled after the completion of the third bridge. The third bridge is a box girder prestressed concrete bridge between the first and the second bridge completed in 2000.)
4	Banghwa Bridge	방화대교	180 m (590 ft)	2,599 m (8,527 ft)	Arch; Steel through arch Twin bridges	Incheon International Airport Expressway; Han River	2000	Goyang; Seoul; Gangseo; 37°35′17.3″N 126°49′34.5″E	Gyeonggi; Seoul	
5	Magok Bridge	마곡대교	120 m (390 ft) (x3)	2,393 m (7,851 ft)	Truss; Steel	AREX; Han River		Goyang - Seoul; Gangseo; 37°34′55.3″N 126°50′26.3″E	Gyeonggi; Seoul	
6	Gayang Bridge	가양대교	180 m (590 ft)	1,700 m (5,600 ft)	Box girder Steel; 110+180+110	Road bridge Gayang-daero; Han River	2002	Seoul; Mapo - Gangseo; 37°34′11.2″N 126°51′40.4″E	Seoul	
7	World Cup Bridge	월드컵대교	225 m (738 ft)	1,980 m (6,500 ft)	Cable-stayed; Steel box girder (main span), concrete box girder (back span), concrete pylon 100+225+120+95	Han River	2020	Seoul; Mapo - Yeongdeungpo; 37°33′19.3″N 126°53′05.1″E	Seoul	
8	Seongsan Bridge	성산대교	120 m (390 ft) (x8)	1,410 m (4,630 ft)	Arch; Steel deck arch	National Route 1 National Route 48; Han River		Seoul; Mapo - Yeongdeungpo; 37°33′07.5″N 126°53′27.8″E	Seoul	
9	Yanghwa Bridge	양화대교	112 m (367 ft)	1,053 m (3,455 ft)	Arch; Steel tied arch Twin bridges	National Route 6 National Route 77; Han River	1965; 1982	Seoul; Mapo - Yeongdeungpo; 37°32′39.3″N 126°54′19.1″E	Seoul	(Note: The twin bridges were originally entirely classic girder structures, steel tied-arches were added in 2010 to widening the main channel and to allow 5000t ships to pass.)
10	Dangsan Railway Bridge	당산철교	90 m (300 ft)	1,360 m (4,460 ft)	Box girder Steel	Seoul Subway Line 2 Han River	1999	Seoul; Mapo - Yeongdeungpo; 37°32′26.9″N 126°54′28.2″E	Seoul	
11	Seogang Bridge	서강대교	150 m (490 ft)	1,706 m (5,597 ft)	Arch; Steel tied-arch	Road bridge Gukhoe-daero; Han River	1999	Seoul; Mapo - Yeongdeungpo; 37°32′29.2″N 126°55′40.8″E	Seoul	
12	Mapo Bridge	마포대교	35 m (115 ft)	1,390 m (4,560 ft)	Box girder Steel	National Route 46; Han River	1970; 2001	Seoul; Mapo - Yeongdeungpo; 37°32′01.2″N 126°56′11.8″E	Seoul	
13	Wonhyo Bridge	원효대교	100 m (330 ft) (x10)	1,470 m (4,820 ft)	Box girder Prestressed concrete	Road bridge Yeouidaebang-ro; Han River	1981	Seoul; Yongsan - Yeongdeungpo; 37°31′37.4″N 126°56′44.5″E	Seoul	
14	Hangang Railway Bridge	한강철교		1,113 m (3,652 ft)	Truss; Steel; 4 bridges	Gyeongbu Line; Seoul Subway Line 1 Han River	1900; 1912; 1944; 1994	Seoul; Yongsan - Dongjak; 37°31′09.4″N 126°57′06.3″E	Seoul	
15	Hangang Bridge	한강대교	63 m (207 ft)	2,005 m (6,578 ft)	Arch; Steel tied-arch Twin bridges	Road bridge Yangnyeong-ro; Han River	1917	Seoul; Yongsan - Dongjak; 37°30′56.5″N 126°57′27.2″E	Seoul	
16	Dongjak Bridge	동작대교	80 m (260 ft)	2,047 m (6,716 ft)	Arch; Steel tied-arch	Rail road bridge Dongjak-daero; Seoul Subway Line 4 Han River	1984	Seoul; Yongsan - Dongjak; 37°30′37.9″N 126°58′54.8″E	Seoul	
17	Jamsu Bridge; Banpo Bridge	잠수교 반포대교	30 m (98 ft)	795 m (2,608 ft); 1,495 m (4,905 ft)	Box girder Steel	Road bridge Banpo-daero; Han River	1976; 1982	Seoul; Yongsan - Seocho; 37°30′56.8″N 126°59′45.6″E	Seoul	
18	Hannam Bridge	한남대교	65 m (213 ft)	919 m (3,015 ft)	Beam; Steel	Road bridge Gangnam-daero; Han River	1969	Seoul; Yongsan - Gangnam; 37°31′38.6″N 127°00′46.2″E	Seoul	
19	Dongho Bridge	동호대교	80 m (260 ft)	1,220 m (4,000 ft)	Truss; Steel	Rail road bridge Nonhyeon-ro; Seoul Subway Line 3 Han River	1985	Seoul; Seongdong - Gangnam; 37°32′11.2″N 127°01′15.8″E	Seoul	
20	Seongsu Bridge	성수대교	120 m (390 ft)	1,160 m (3,810 ft)	Truss; Steel	Road bridge Eonju-ro; Han River	1979	Seoul; Seongdong - Gangnam; 37°32′14.3″N 127°02′06.5″E	Seoul	
21	Yeongdong Bridge	영동대교	50 m (160 ft)	1,065 m (3,494 ft)	Beam; Steel	National Route 47 Local Route 23; Han River	1973	Seoul; Gwangjin - Gangnam; 37°31′48.3″N 127°03′26.0″E	Seoul	
22	Cheongdam Bridge	청담대교	90 m (300 ft)	1,211 m (3,973 ft)	Box girder Steel; 2 levels	Dongbu Expressway; Seoul Subway Line 7 Han River	2001	Seoul; Gwangjin - Gangnam; 37°31′33.1″N 127°03′51.2″E	Seoul	
23	Jamsil Bridge	잠실대교	50 m (160 ft)	1,280 m (4,200 ft)	Beam; Steel	National Route 3 Han River	1972	Seoul; Gwangjin - Songpa; 37°31′27.5″N 127°05′29.9″E	Seoul	
24	Jamsil Railway Bridge	잠실철교	50 m (160 ft)	1,270 m (4,170 ft)	Box girder Steel	Seoul Subway Line 2 Han River	1979	Seoul; Gwangjin - Songpa; 37°31′44.1″N 127°05′55.1″E	Seoul	
25	Olympic Bridge	올림픽대교	150 m (490 ft) (x2)	1,470 m (4,820 ft)	Cable-stayed; Concrete box girder deck, concrete pylon 150+150	Road bridge Gangdong-daero; Han River	1988	Seoul; Gwangjin - Songpa; 37°32′02.2″N 127°06′14.2″E	Seoul	
26	Cheonho Bridge	천호대교	50 m (160 ft)	1,150 m (3,770 ft)	Box girder Steel	National Route 43; Han River	1976	Seoul; Gwangjin - Songpa; 37°32′34.8″N 127°06′43.0″E	Seoul	
27	Gwangjin Bridge	광진교	66 m (217 ft)	1,056 m (3,465 ft)	Beam; Steel	Road bridge Gucheonmyeon-ro; Han River	2003	Seoul; Gwangjin - Gangdong; 37°32′41.3″N 127°06′47.6″E	Seoul	
28	Guri–Amsa Bridge	암사대교	180 m (590 ft)	1,133 m (3,717 ft)	Arch; Steel tied-arch	Road bridge Han River	2015	Guri; Seoul; Gangdong; 37°34′10.6″N 127°07′53.4″E	Gyeonggi; Seoul	
29	Godeok–Topyeong Bridge	고덕토평대교	540 m (1,770 ft)	1,725 m (5,659 ft)	Cable-stayed; Concrete box girder deck, concrete pylons 230+540+230	Sejong–Pocheon Expressway; Han River	2025	Guri; Seoul; Gangdong; 37°34′17.6″N 127°08′57.3″E	Gyeonggi; Seoul	
30	Gangdong Bridge	강동대교	125 m (410 ft)	1,126 m (3,694 ft)	Box girder Prestressed concrete 3 bridges	Seoul Ring Expressway; Han River	1991	Guri; Seoul; Gangdong; 37°34′39.5″N 127°09′41.2″E	Gyeonggi; Seoul	
31	Misa Bridge	미사대교		1,530 m (5,020 ft)	Box girder Prestressed concrete Twin bridges	Seoul–Yangyang Expressway; Han River	2009	Hanam - Namyangju; 37°35′12.3″N 127°11′55.2″E	Gyeonggi	
32	Paldang Bridge	팔당대교	52 m (171 ft)	935 m (3,068 ft)	Box girder Steel	National Route 45; Han River	1995	Hanam - Namyangju; 37°32′45.7″N 127°14′14.7″E	Gyeonggi	

== Notes and references ==
- Notes
- "National Treasure of South Korea". heritage.go.kr (in Korean).
- "한강다리" [Han River Bridges]. metro.seoul.kr (in Korean). Archived from the original on 2002-12-16.
- Nicolas Janberg. "International Database for Civil and Structural Engineering". Structurae.com.
- Others references

== See also ==
- Transport in South Korea
- Rail transport in South Korea
- Highway system in South Korea
- Geography of South Korea
- Korean architecture
