= Noryang Bridge =

Suspension bridge in South Korea

Noryang Bridge 노량대교
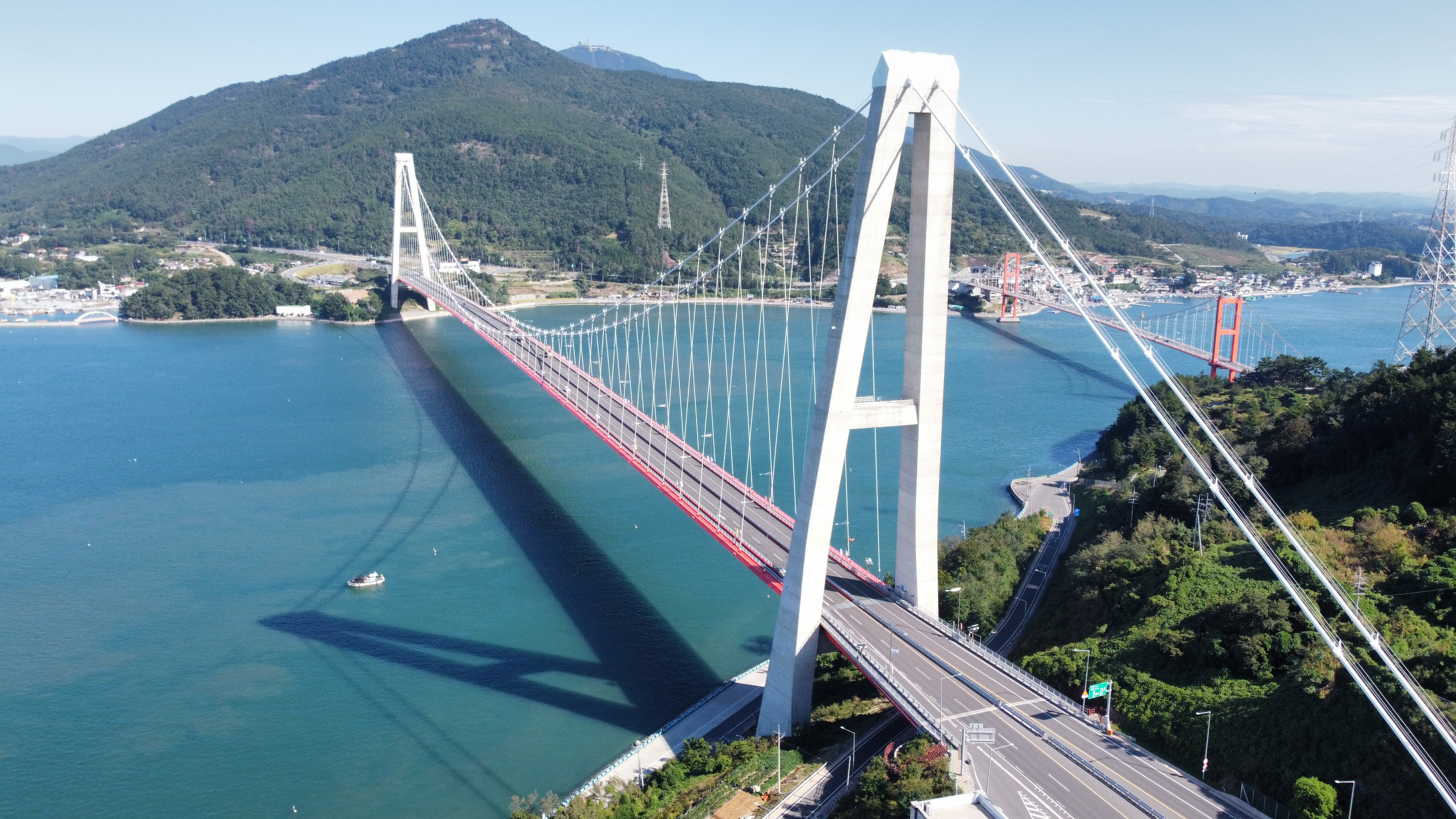
- Coordinates: 34°56′35.8″N 127°52′01.7″E
- Carries: National Route 19 (South Korea)
- Crosses: Sea of Japan
- Locale: Hadong Noryang and Namhae Noryang in South Korea

Characteristics
- Design: Suspension bridge
- Total length: 990 metres (3,250 ft)
- Longest span: 890 metres (2,920 ft)

History
- Opened: 13 september 2018

Location
- Interactive map of Noryang Bridge

Noryang Bridge (Hangul: 노량대교) or Second Namhae Bridge is a suspension bridge that connects Hadong Noryang and Namhae Noryang, South Korea. It carries the National Route 19 near the Namhae Bridge inaugurated in 1973.

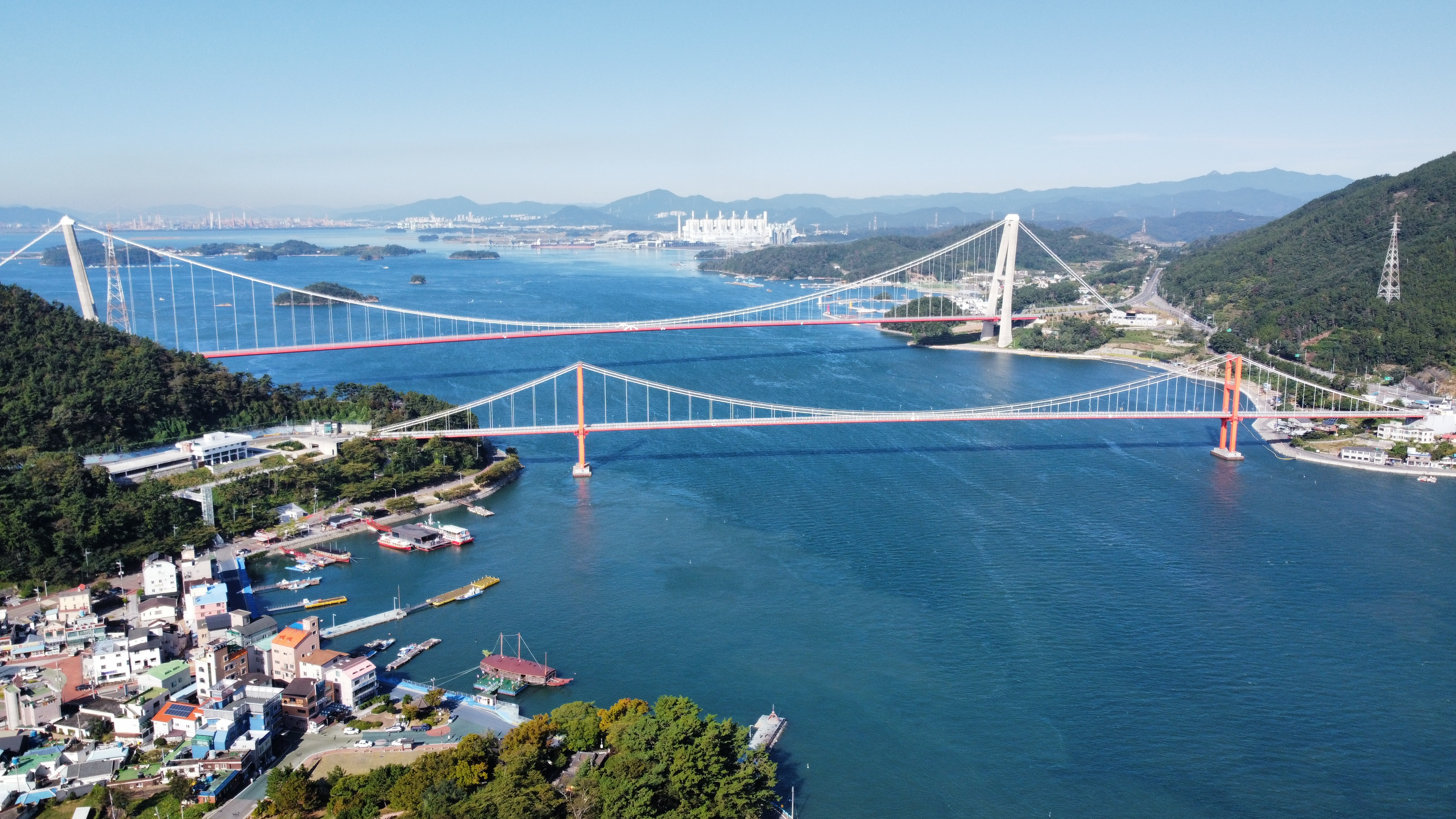

== See also ==
- Transportation in South Korea
- List of bridges in South Korea
