= Godeok–Topyeong Bridge =

Road bridge between Seoul and Guri, South Korea

Godeok–Topyeong Bridge 고덕토평대교 (Korean)
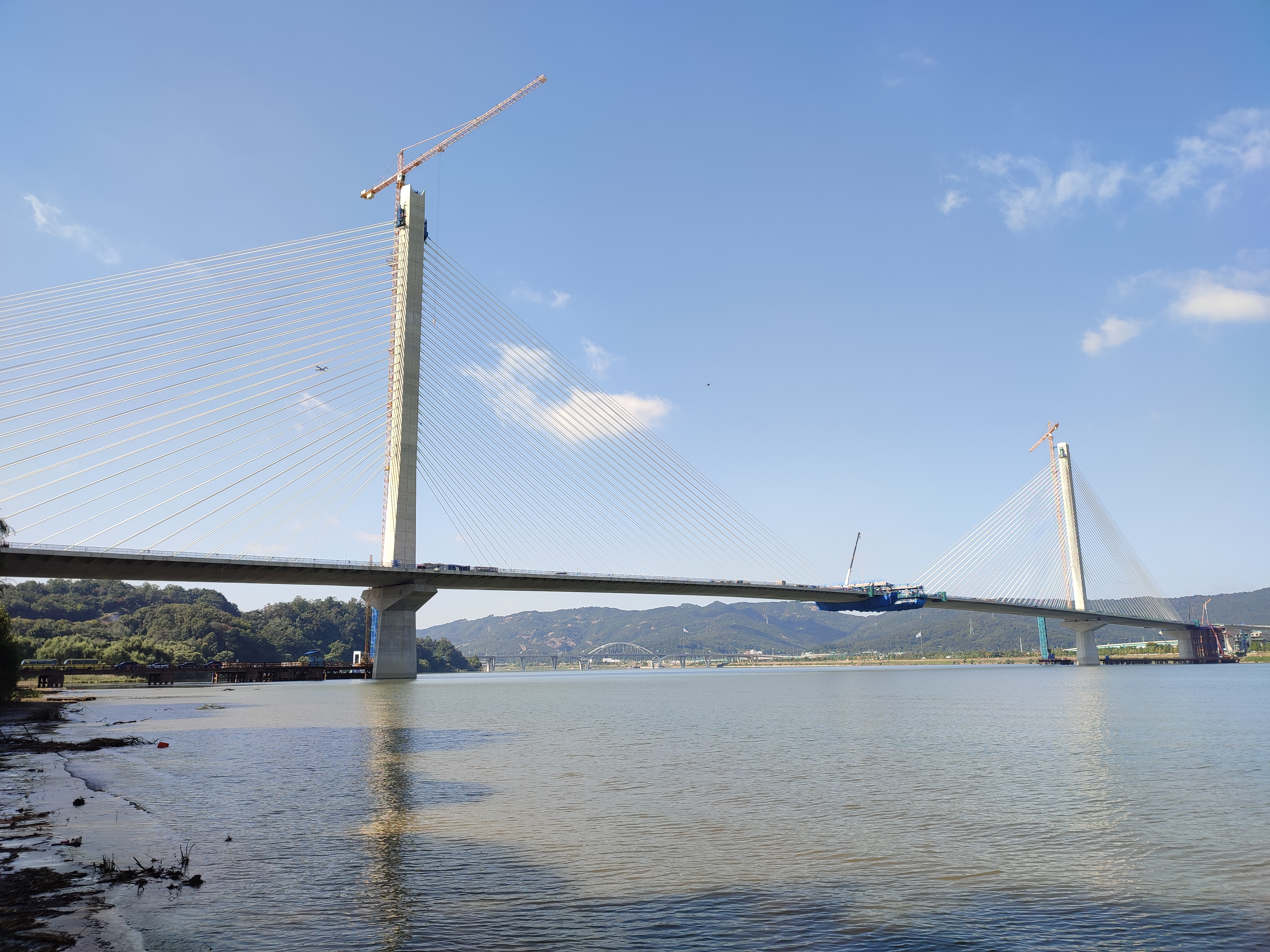
- Coordinates: 37°34′17.6″N 127°08′57.3″E
- Carries: Sejong–Pocheon Expressway
- Crosses: Han River
- Locale: Seoul - Guri, South Korea
- Preceded by: Guri–Amsa Bridge
- Followed by: Gangdong Bridge

Characteristics
- Design: Cable-stayed bridge
- Total length: 1,725 metres (5,659 ft)
- Longest span: 540 metres (1,770 ft)

History
- Constructed by: Hyundai Engineering & Construction
- Opened: January 2025

The Godeok–Topyeong Bridge (Korean: 고덕토평대교) is a cable-stayed bridge connecting Seoul and Guri, Gyeonggi Province, South Korea.

It will carry the Sejong–Pocheon Expressway over the Han River to solve traffic issues on the Seoul Ring Expressway on the Gangdong Bridge.

== See also ==
- Transportation in South Korea
- List of bridges in South Korea
