= Ulsan Bridge =

Suspension bridge in South Korea

Ulsan Bridge 울산대교
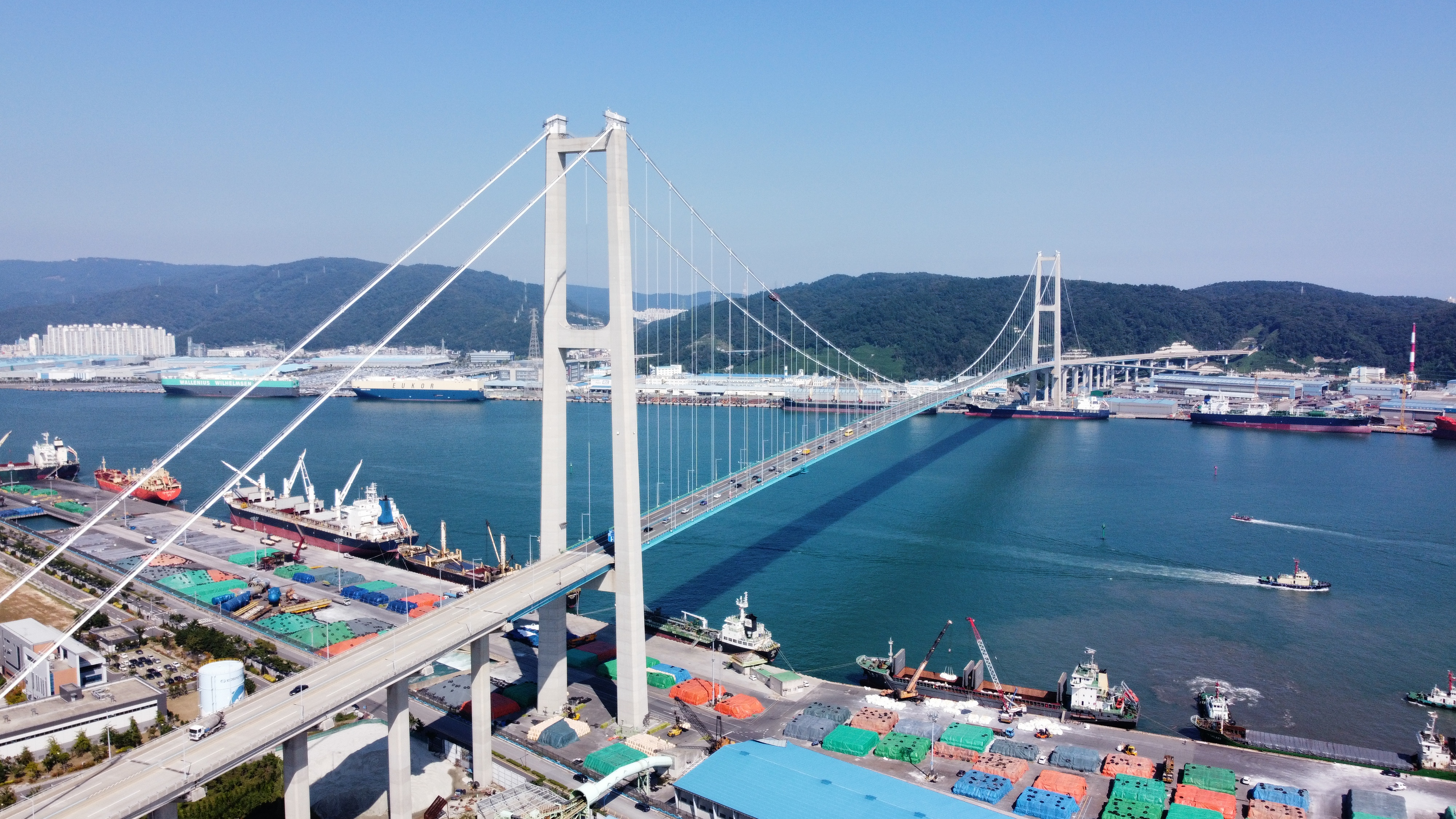
- Coordinates: 35°30′42.8″N 129°23′27.3″E
- Carries: 4 lanes road bridge
- Crosses: Taehwa River
- Locale: Ulsan, South Korea
- Owner: Ulsan Harbor Bridge Corporation

Characteristics
- Design: Suspension bridge
- Total length: 2,970 metres (9,740 ft)
- Width: 25.6 metres (84 ft)
- Height: 203 metres (666 ft)
- Longest span: 1,150 metres (3,770 ft)
- Clearance above: 60 metres (200 ft)

History
- Construction start: 30 November 2009
- Opened: 1 June 2015

Statistics
- Toll: yes

Ulsan Bridge (Hangul: 울산대교) is a suspension bridge in the south coast of South Korea. Opened in 2015, it is the second longest bridge span in South Korea.

== See also ==
- Transportation in South Korea
- List of bridges in South Korea
