= Yi Sun-sin Bridge =

Suspension bridge in Yeosu, South Korea

Yi Sun-sin Bridge 이순신대교
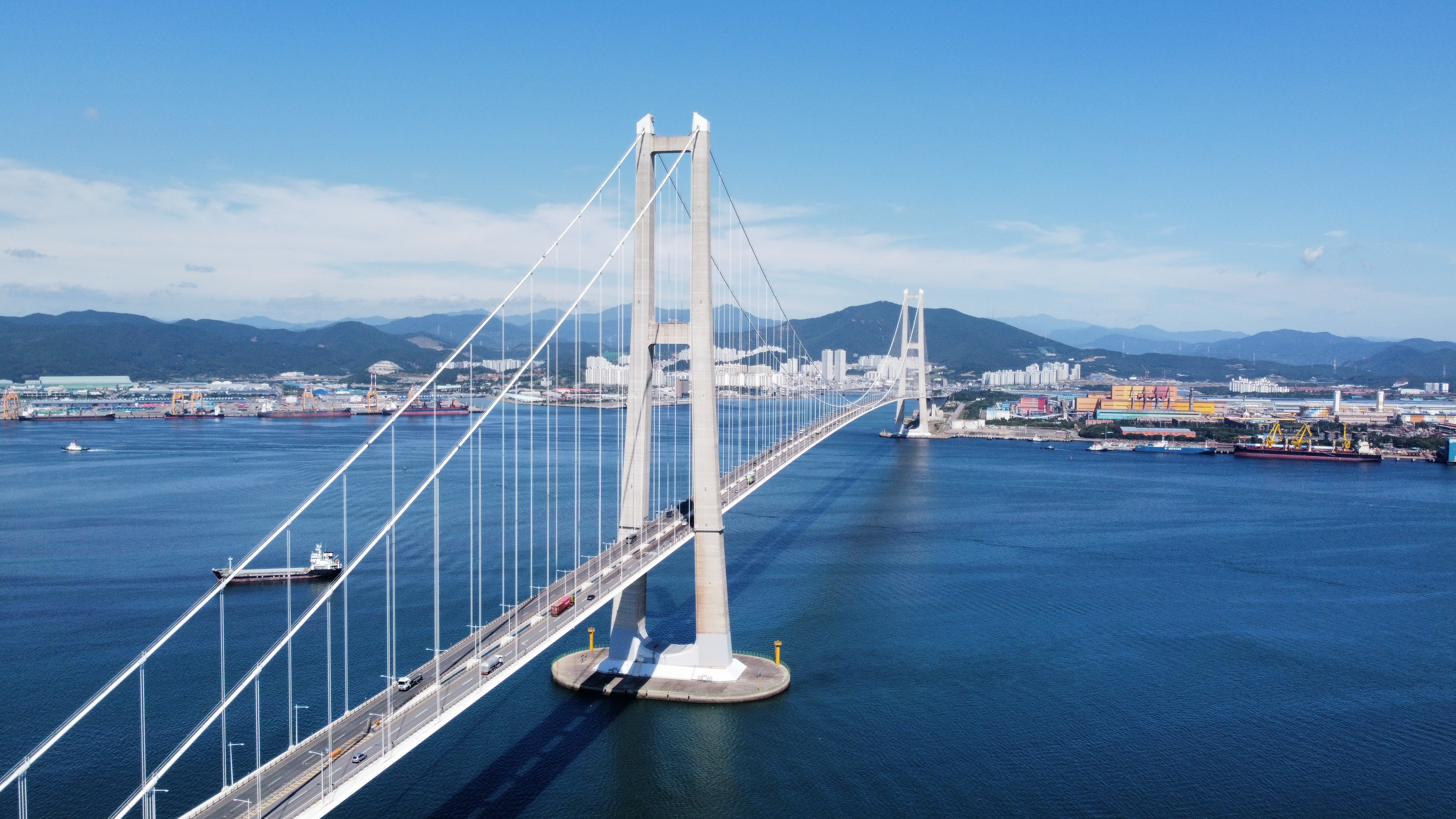
- Coordinates: 34.899237°N 127.704808°E
- Carries: Isunsin-daero
- Crosses: South Sea
- Locale: Yeosu, South Jeolla Province, South Korea

Characteristics
- Design: Suspension bridge
- Total length: 2,260 metres (7,410 ft)
- Width: 27 metres (89 ft)
- Height: 270 metres (890 ft)
- Longest span: 1,545 metres (5,069 ft)
- Clearance above: 80m

History
- Designer: Yooshin corporation
- Engineering design by: Yooshin corporation
- Constructed by: Daelim Industrial Co.
- Construction start: November 2007
- Opened: 12 May 2012

Statistics
- Toll: none

Yi Sun-sin Bridge (Korean: 이순신대교; Hanja: 李舜臣大橋) is a suspension bridge in Yeosu, South Jeolla Province, South Korea. The bridge is one part of The Approach Road to Yeosu Industrial Complex. It is the world's eighth longest suspension bridge in terms of its main span length of 1,545 m since it opened in 2012. The bridge connects Gwangyang with Myodo-dong, a small island that is also part of Yeosu.

Yi Sun-sin was a Korean Admiral who was born in 1545 and built the world first ironclad warship called 'the Turtle ship' and defended the country against Japanese navy in the Joseon period. The bridge was designed by Yooshin Engineering Corporation and was constructed by Daelim Industrial Company.

Unlike the previous suspension bridges in Korea, Daelim's engineers carried out the whole construction engineering by themselves despite its outstanding scale compared with the former ones.

The bridge was a finalist in the Outstanding Structure Award 2013.

== Gallery ==
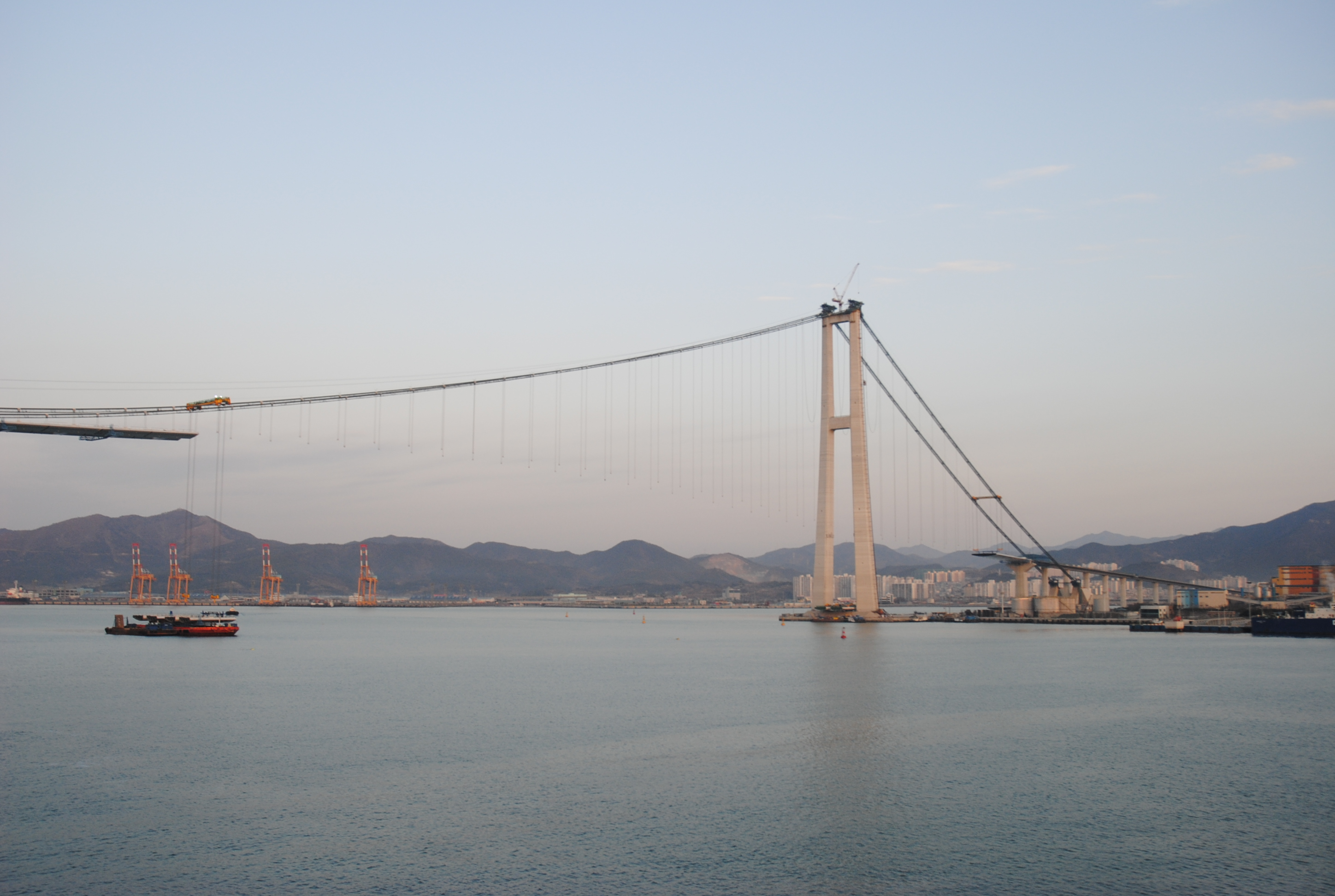
The bridge under construction (2011)

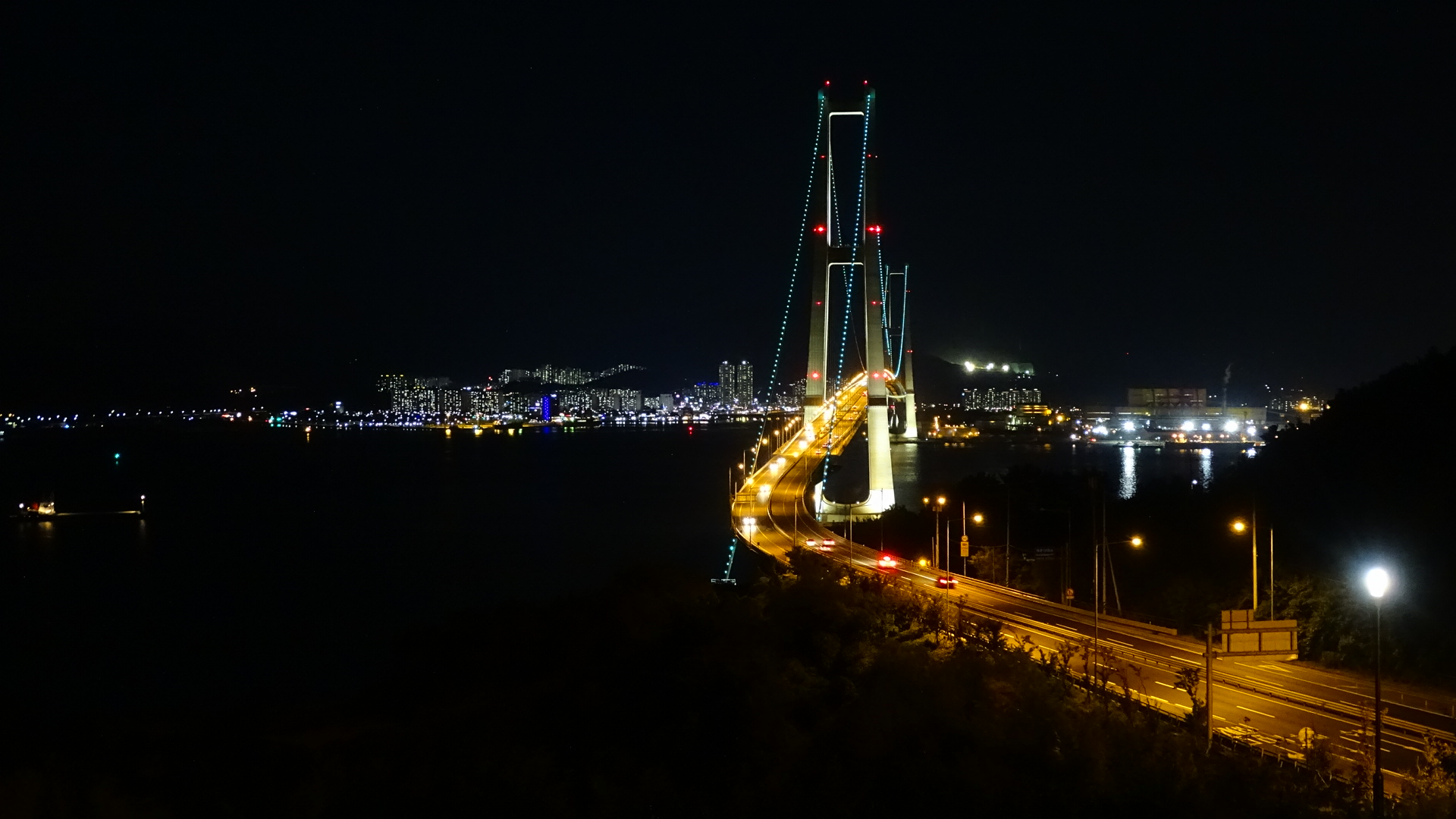
The bridge at night (2018)

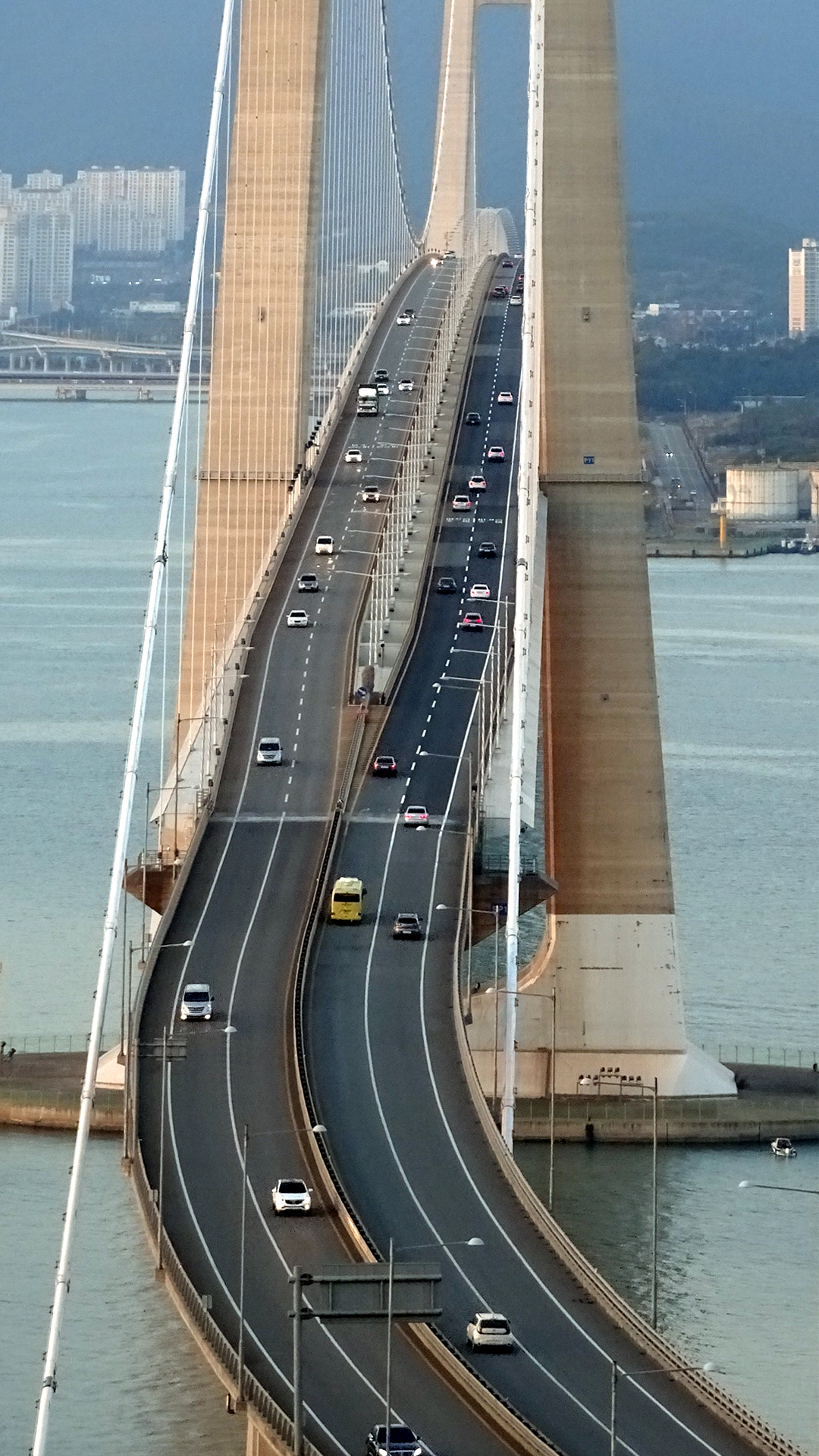
Detail of cars on the bridge (2018)

== See also ==
- Dolsan Bridge – another bridge in Yeosu
- Geobukseon Bridge – another bridge in Yeosu

== See also ==
- Transportation in South Korea
- List of bridges in South Korea
