= Sepung Bridge =

Cable-stayed bridge in South Korea

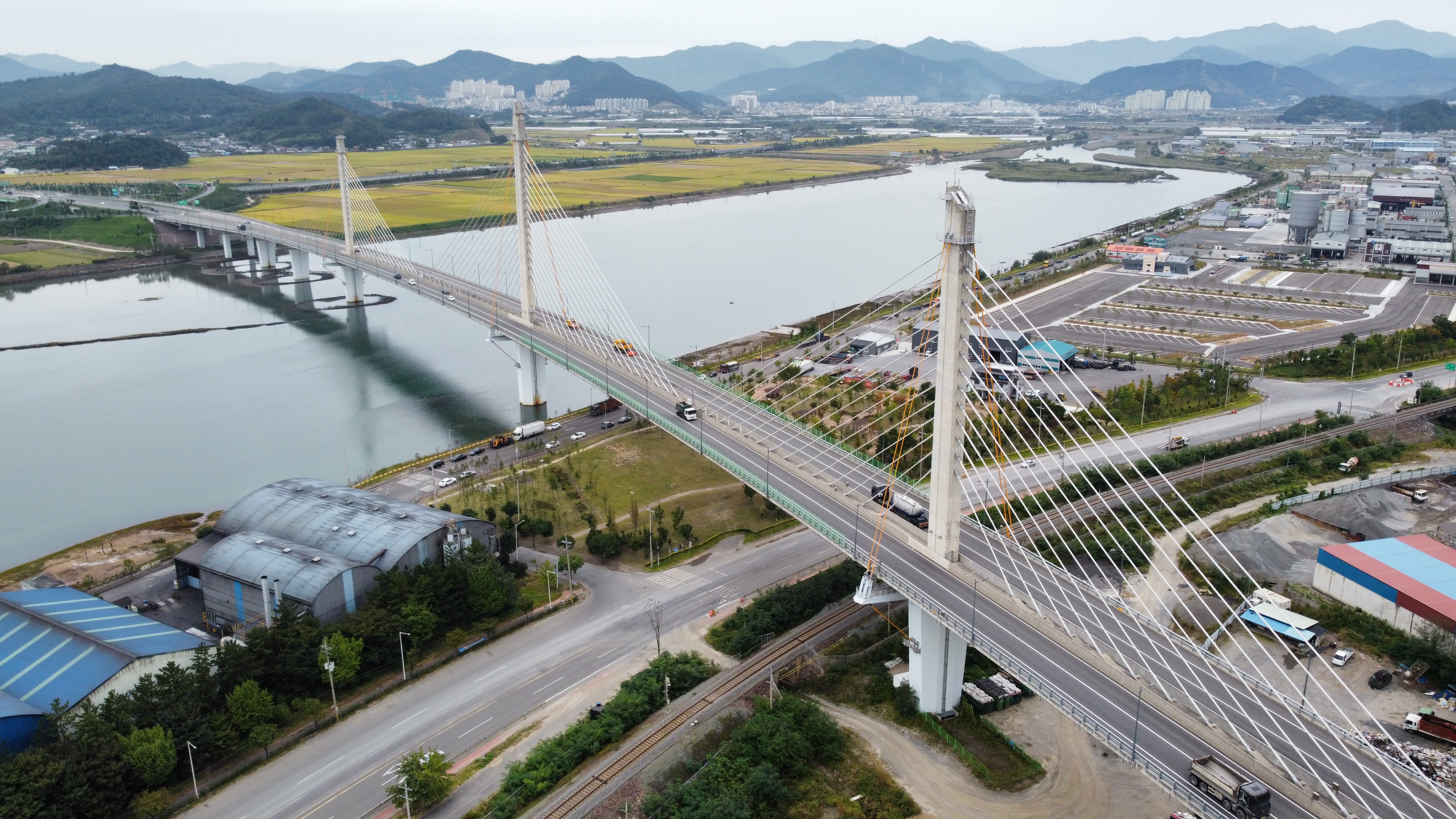
- Sepung Bridge, South Korea
- Coordinates: 34°56′12″N 127°36′08″E
- Carries: 4 lanes of motor vehicles
- Crosses: Gwangyang Western River
- Locale: Gwangyang, South Korea

Characteristics
- Design: Cable-stayed
- Material: Concrete
- Total length: approach 150 metres (490 ft) main 725 metres (2,379 ft)
- Width: 23.9 metres (78 ft)

History
- Constructed by: Daelim Industrial
- Construction start: 2006
- Construction end: 2014
- Construction cost: $23 million USD
- Opened: 2014

Location
- Interactive map of Sepung Bridge

The Sepung Bridge is the first curved, cable-stayed bridge in South Korea. It crosses the Gwangyang western river, a railway and a roadway in South Korea. It was built by Iksan Regional Construction & Management Administration.

== History ==
Construction commenced in October 2006 and was completed in June 2014. The bridge was built by contractor Daelim Industrial Co., LTD. The contract amount was 23.0 million USD.

The side spans of the bridge and the approach bridges were built using full staging, while the main spans at each tower were built out using the free cantilever method. For the erection of the 6m-long, 210t segments, a form traveler facilitated easy observation of the operation and was suitable for cast-in-place concrete. The construction of three pylons was carried out in auto climbing form because of safety risks from working over the sea.

PY1, PY2 and PY3 are 86.7m, 101m and 88m respectively in height and are made of concrete grade 40MPa. PY1 and PY3 were constructed at the same time. After finishing the construction of two pylons, PY2 was built.

== Design ==
The bridge is 875m long. It consists of a 150m-long approach bridge and a multi-span cable-stayed bridge with two 220m-long main spans and 52.5m-long side spans.

The Sepung bridge is curved with a radius of 2000m. In order to reduce the deformation of the pylons toward the center of the circle, two cables run from the top to the bottom of the pylon. It is also effective for increasing the torsional rigidity.

This bridge is designed to accommodate dual four-lane traffic; its design incorporates a curved stiffening girder and additional transverse cables to stabilize each tower. The stiffening girder is designed as a PC box using reinforced concrete of grade 40MPa; It is 3.3m deep and almost 24m wide, and incorporates steel struts and FRP pipe struts filled with concrete in the internal and external box respectively, to resist the local tensile stress. These internal and external struts are placed at typical centers of 6m and 3m, respectively, and give the stiffening girder and increased torsional rigidity and make the decks 20% lighter than a traditional concrete box girder. In this bridge, a single plane multiple cable system with harp arrangement was chosen in order to reduce the longitudinal and transverse deformation of the towers. As the shear center deviates from the center of the stiffening girder due to the application of the asymmetric cable forces and self-weight, twisting and transverse deformation may occur.

== See also ==
- Transportation in South Korea
- List of bridges in South Korea
