= Cheongpung Bridge =

Cheongpung Bridge 청풍대교
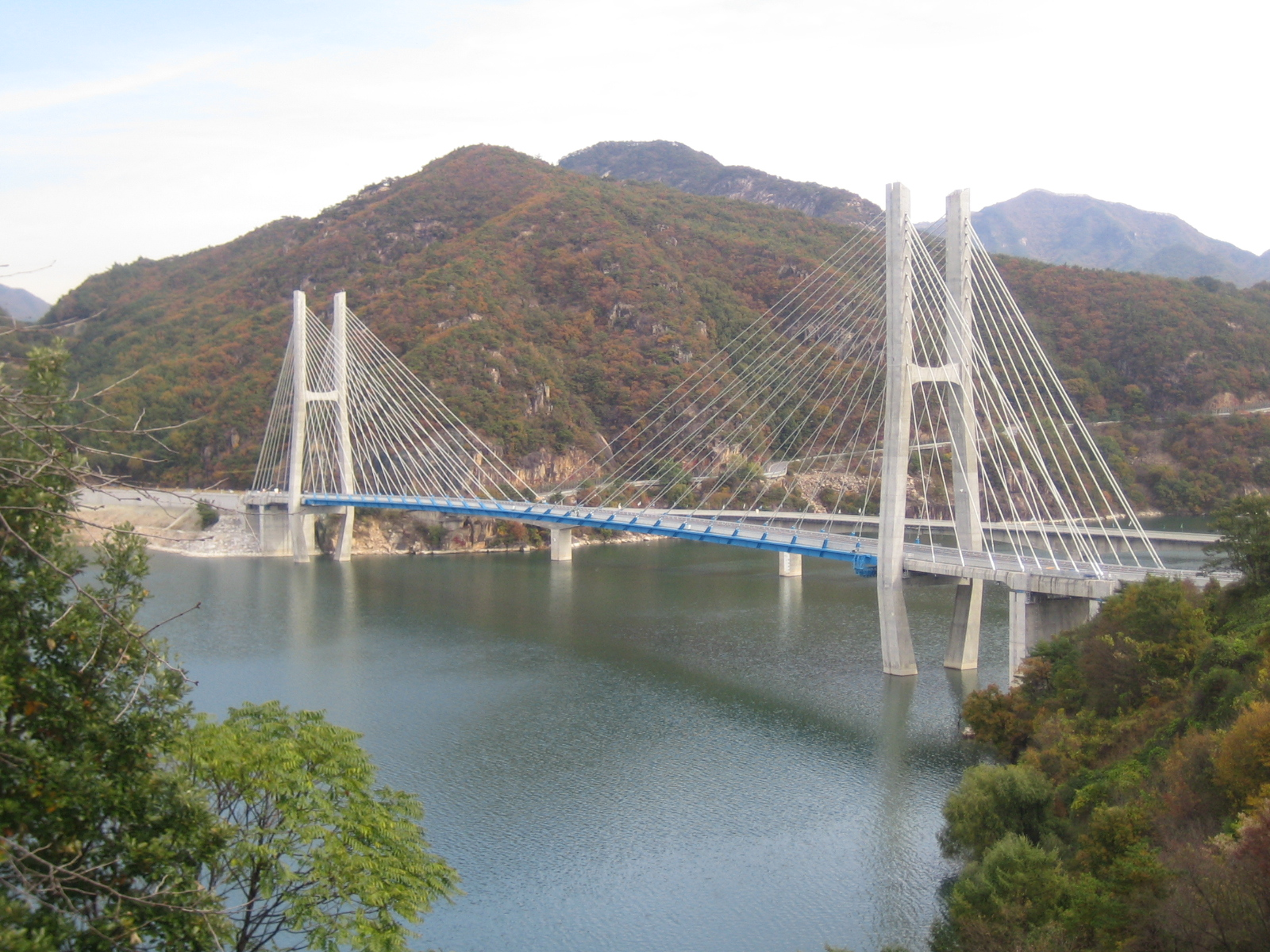
- Coordinates: 37°00′12″N 128°10′47″E
- Carries: Route 82
- Crosses: Chungju Lake
- Locale: North Chungcheong Province, South Korea

Characteristics
- Longest span: 327m

History
- Constructed by: Daelim Industrial Co.

Location
- Interactive map of Cheongpung Bridge

Cheongpung Bridge (Korean: 청풍대교; RR: Cheongpungdaegyo) is a cable-stayed bridge which crosses the lake formed by Chungju Dam (part of the Namhan River system, a tributary of the Han River) in North Chungcheong Province, South Korea on Route 82 in that region.

The bridge project began in December 2004 and was scheduled to be completed in September 2010, to replace an existing PSC box girder bridge which had required periodic rehabilitation and repair work. As the area where the bridge was constructed has well-known natural scenery and attractions, it was designed to support tourism development plans.

== Construction and design ==
The bridge was built by contractor Daelim Industrial Co., LTD, at a contract price of 40.3 million USD. Concrete pylon height with typical H-shape is 103m and constructed by auto climbing form. The main span of 327m across the lake is constructed using the free cantilever method and the side span of 57.5m is constructed by the full staging method. The combination of composite section (reinforced concrete deck and I-shaped steel girder) for the center span and concrete section for side spans applied to the bridge because of decreasing effect of weight balance. The concrete pylons have typical H-shape. The leg shape beneath the superstructure level, on the other hand, needed to be narrower dto make the size of foundation smaller allowing less rock excavation at foundation locations and better handling of construction unit (caisson) considering the site condition. The cable is a multi strand system as two planes semi-fan, and there is extra pier support in each side span. To maximize the counter weight effect by concrete girder at side span, it was necessary to make the side span heavier as possible and not to have excessive bending moment by increasing dead load. Here, the extra pier support allows more weight and stiffness in the side span without resulting in excessive bending moment in girders and pylons.

Carries	2lanes
Location	Mooltae-ri~Dohwa-ri, Sheongpung-myeon, Jecheon-si, Chungcheongbuk-do
Total length	442m
Width	14.5m
Height	103m
Longest span	327m
Construction begin	DEC. 2004
Construction end	SEP. 2010

== Gallery ==
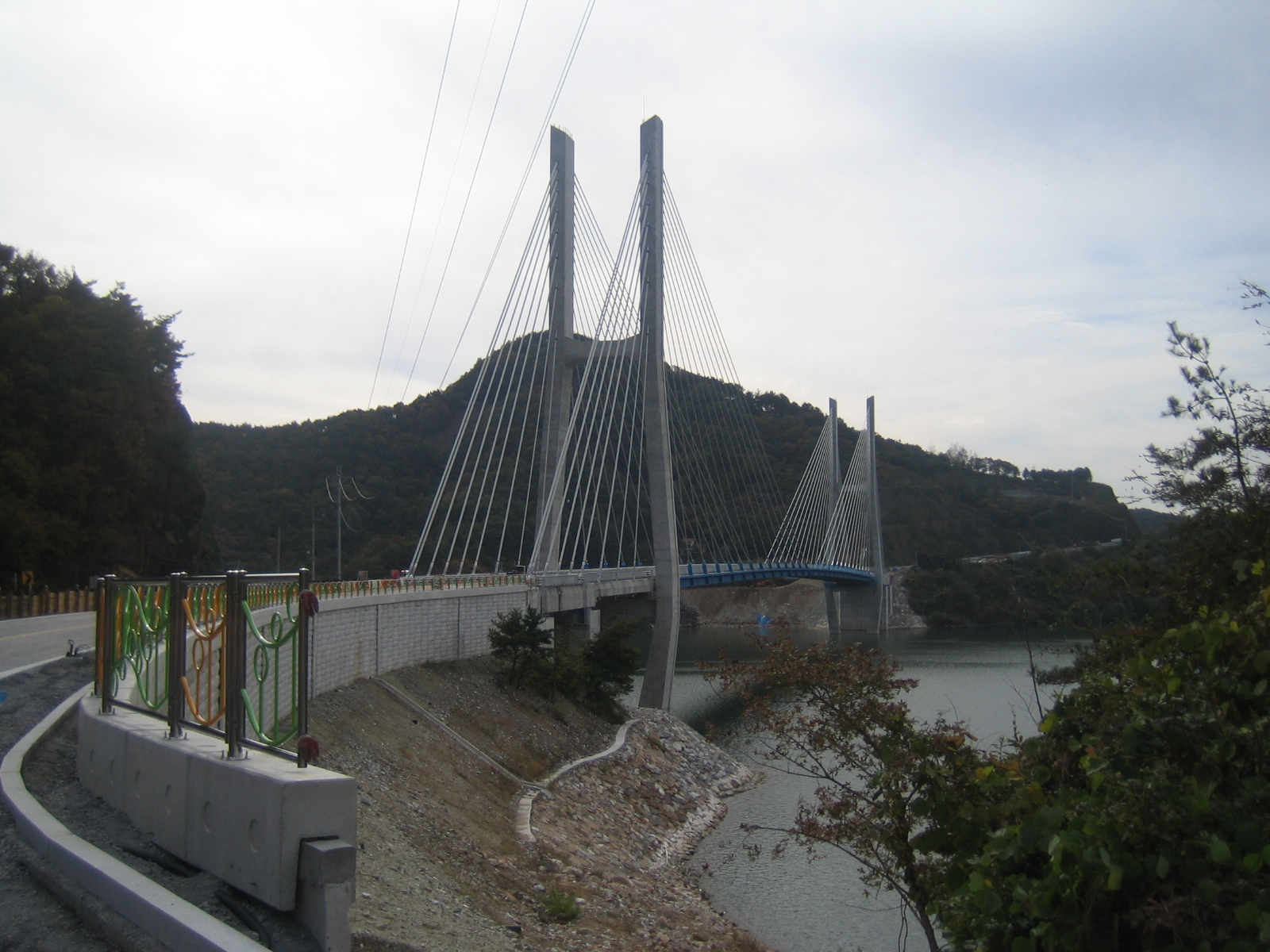
Cheong Poong Bridge _View1

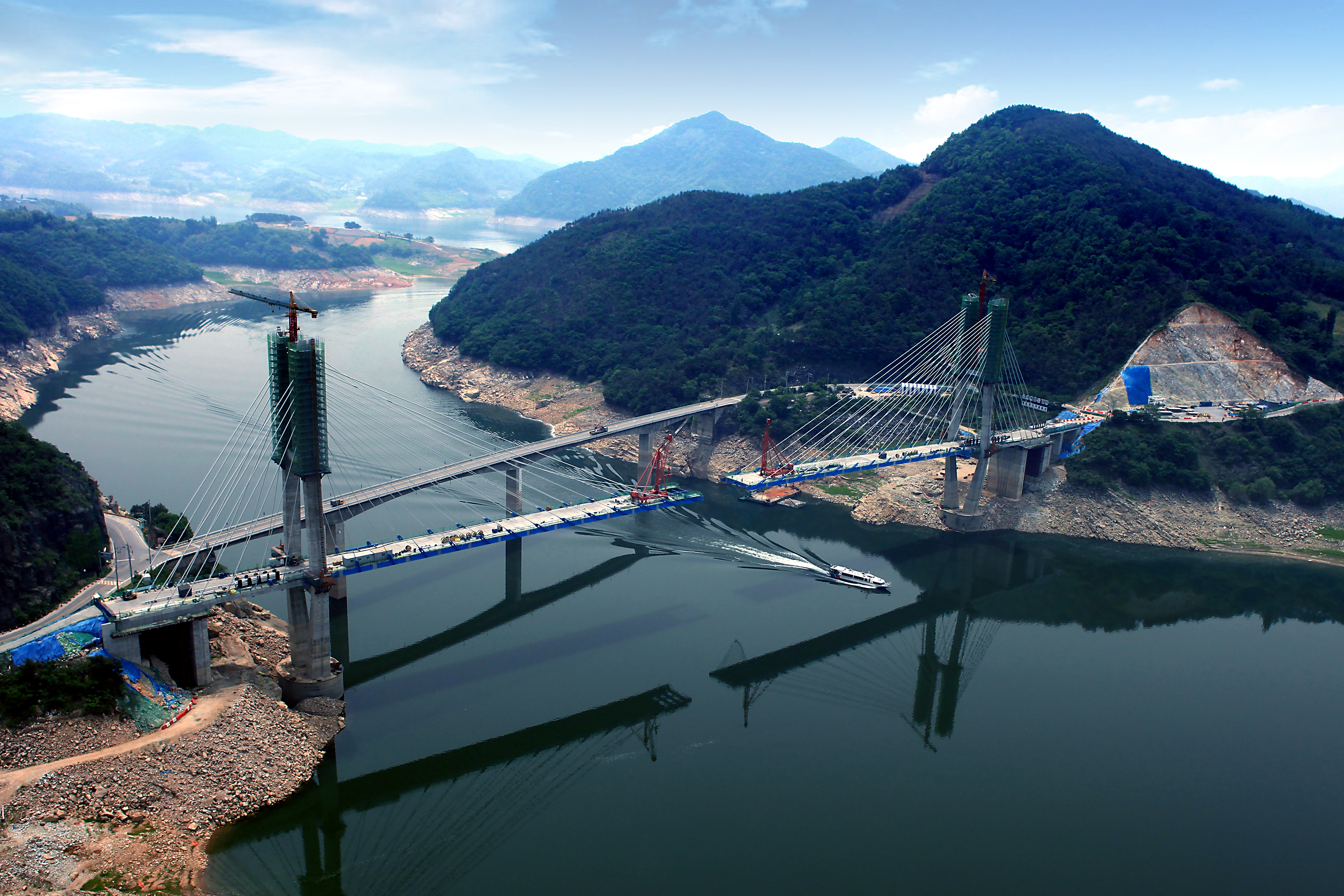
Cheong Poong Bridge _View2

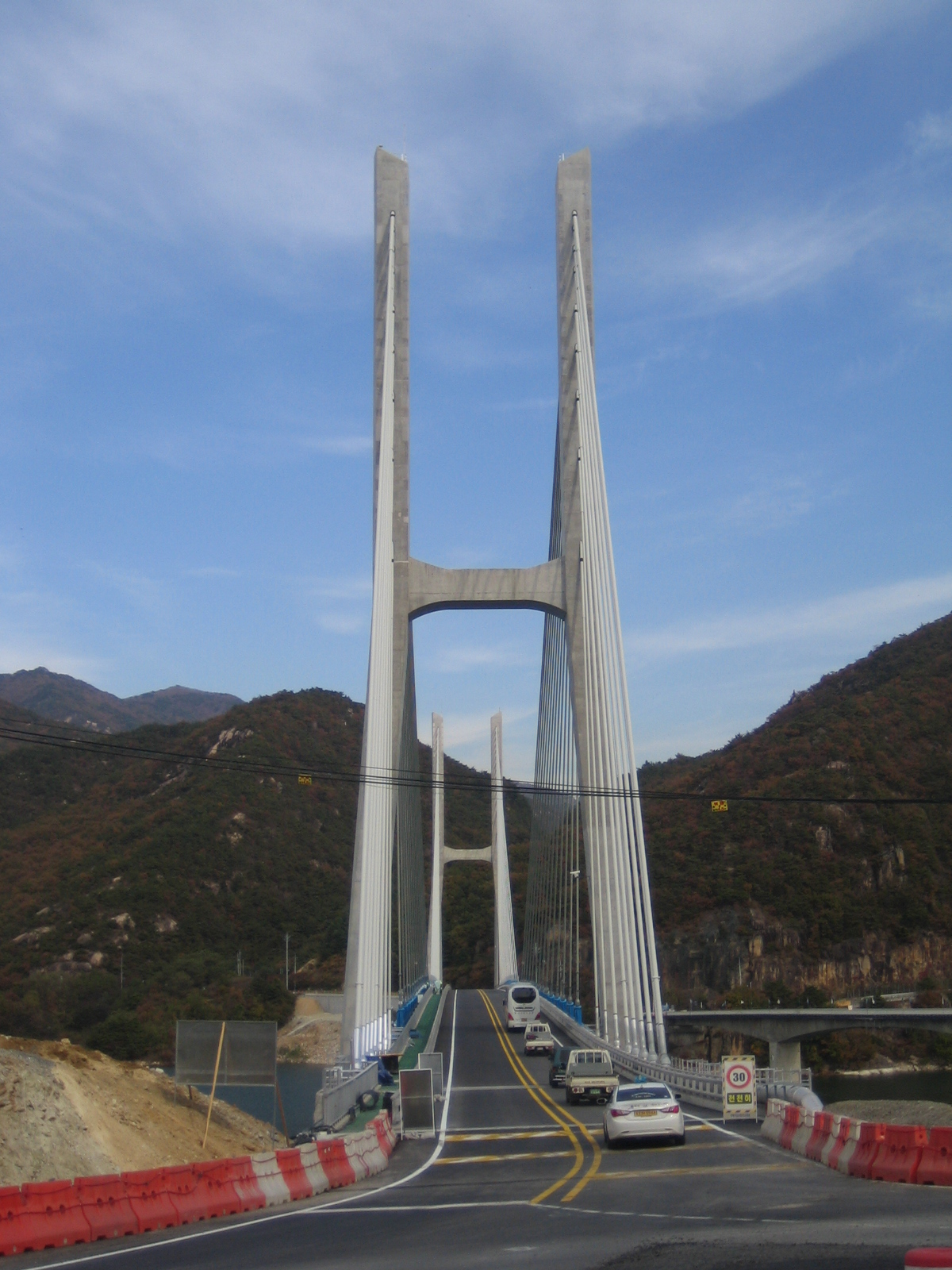
Cheong Poong Bridge _View4

== See also ==
- Transportation in South Korea
- List of bridges in South Korea
