= Ilsan Bridge =

Suspension bridge in South Korea

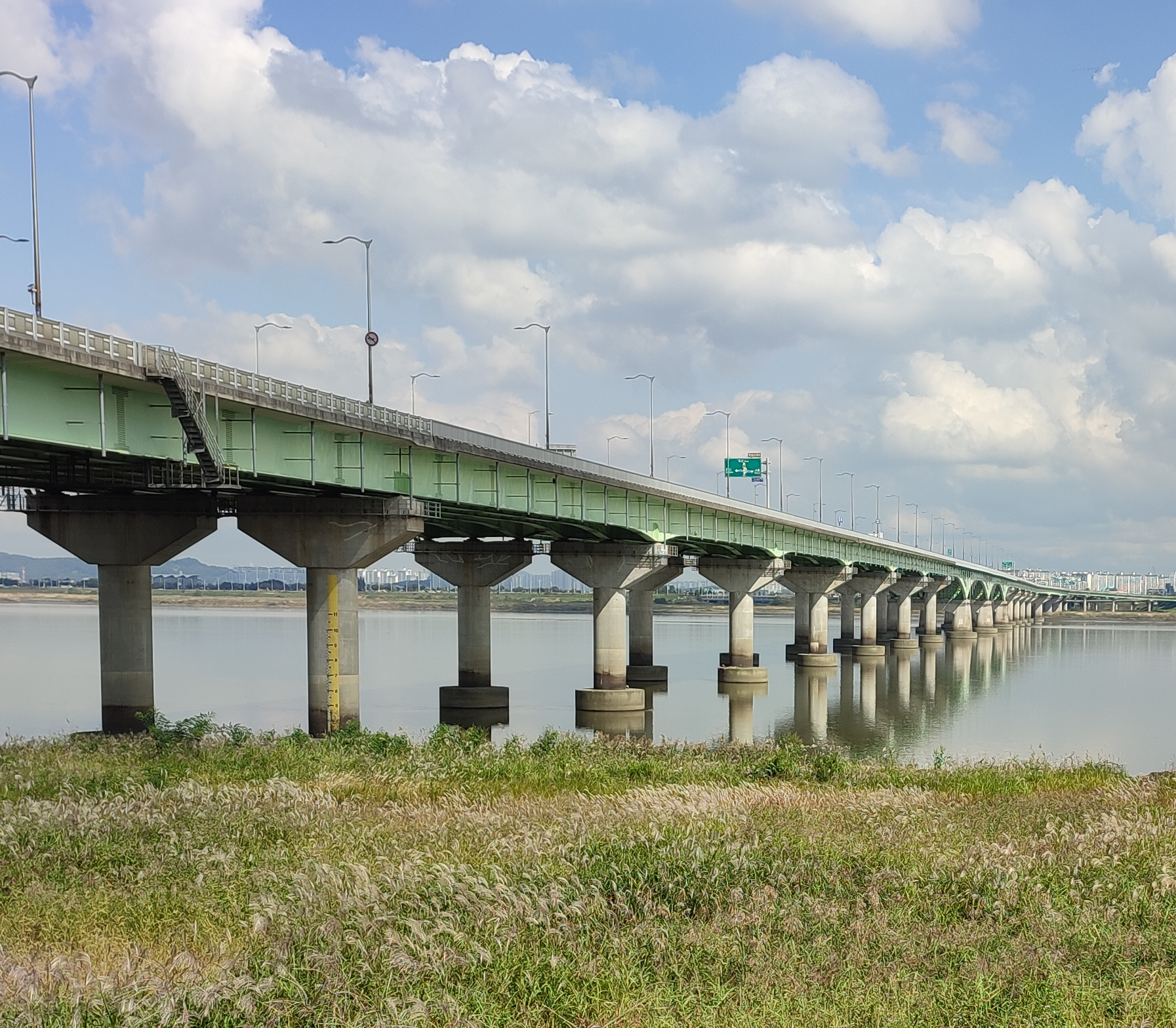
- Coordinates: 37°39′03″N 126°43′00″E
- Carries: Local Route 98
- Crosses: Han River
- Locale: Gimpo - Goyang, Gyeonggi Province
- Preceded by: Gimpo Bridge
- Followed by: Last bridge on Han river

Characteristics
- Design: Beam bridge
- Total length: 1,840 metres (6,040 ft)
- Width: 28.5 metres (94 ft)
- Longest span: 110 metres (360 ft)

History
- Opened: 10 January 2008

Korean name
- Hangul: 일산대교
- Hanja: 一山大橋
- RR: Ilsan daegyo
- MR: Ilsan taegyo

Location
- Interactive map of Ilsan Bridge

The Ilsan Bridge (Korean: 일산대교) crosses the Han River in South Korea and connects the cities of Gimpo and Goyang in the Gyeonggi Province. The bridge was completed in 2008.

== See also ==
- Transportation in South Korea
- List of bridges in South Korea
