= Hyundai Engineering and Construction =

South Korean construction company

Hyundai Engineering and Construction Co., Ltd.

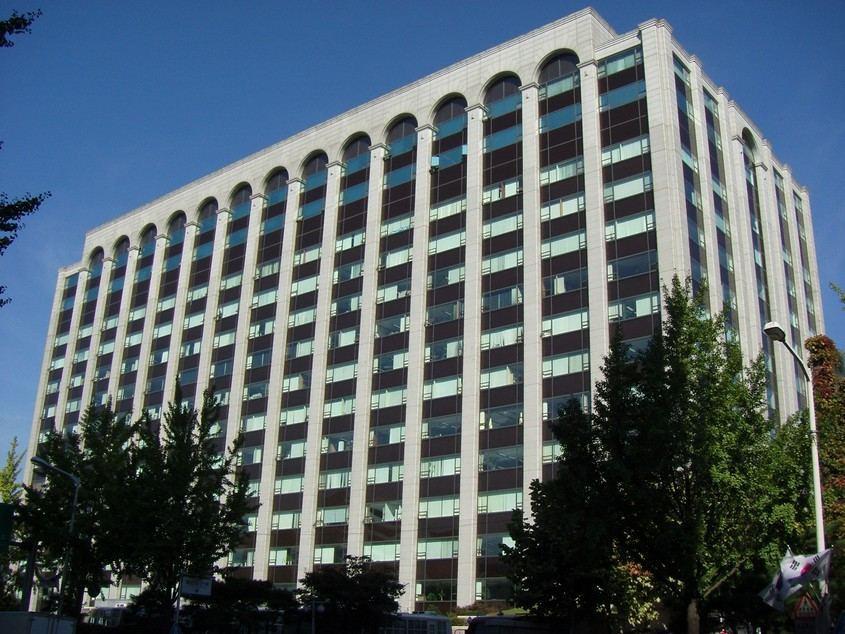
- Native name: 현대건설
- Type: Public
- Traded as: KRX: 000720
- Industry: Construction
- Founded: 1947; 79 years ago
- Founder: Chung Ju-yung
- Headquarters: Jongno District, Seoul, South Korea
- Area served: Worldwide
- Key people: Yoon Young-joon (president and CEO); Lee Won-Woo (EVP); Kim Kwang-Pyung (SVP & CFO)
- Net income: 295,656,000 (2007)
- Parent: Hyundai Motor Group
- Website: https://www.hdec.kr

- Hyundai Engineering and Construction
- Hangul: 현대건설
- Hanja: 現代建設
- RR: Hyeondae geonseol
- MR: Hyŏndae kŏnsŏl

Hyundai Engineering and Construction Co., Ltd. (HDEC; Korean: 현대건설) is a major construction company in South Korea. The company was founded by Chung Ju-yung in 1947 as the Hyundai Civil Works Company and was a major component of the Hyundai Group. Hyundai Construction and Hyundai Engineering merged in 1999.

Hyundai Construction played a major role in the importation of Korean laborers to the Middle East to work on construction projects in the 1970s and 1980s. In the decade following 1975, Hyundai signed their first contract in the region for construction of a shipyard for the Iranian Navy near Bandar-e Abbas. 800,000 Koreans went to work in Saudi Arabia and another 25,000 went to Iran; Hyundai was their largest employer.

Under creditors' management with Korea Exchange Bank as the largest creditor, Hyundai Group was split into several entities from 2001 to 2006. As of March 2007, HDEC is the main shareholder of Hyundai Merchant Marine, which is the de facto holding company of Hyundai Group. Hyundai Group and Hyundai Motor Group (another spin-off from Hyundai Group) are both vying to purchase HDEC.

In 2011, Hyundai Motor Group became the new owner of Hyundai Engineering & Construction. This was determined by Korean banks' decision after the company won a bidding war against the Korean Merchant Marine.

In South Korea, it is also well known as an apartment developer, with its brand name being HILLSTATE.

== Key landmark construction sites ==
- Godeok-Topyeong Bridge
- Pattani-Narathiwat Highway, Thailand
- Bangabandhu Bridge, Bangladesh
- Kyeong-bu (Seoul-Busan) expressway
- North Han river, Soyanggang Dam, multipurpose Dam
- Seoul Gangnam apartment introduction in Korea during 1970
- Seoul Subway
- Hyundai Ulsan shipyard
- Hyundai Motor Ulsan complex
- Ulsan Industrial complex
- Posco Giant Pohang and Gwangyang (South-west of Korean peninsula) complex
- Jabel Ali Industrial harbour construction
- Suntec City tower project, Singapore
- Ulsan Grand Bridge
- Geogeum Grand Bridge
- Masan Changwon Grand Bridge
- Jagorawi Toll Road, Indonesia
- Sheikh Jaber Al-Ahmad Al-Sabah Causeway, Kuwait
- QAFCO 4,5 & 6 - Mesaieed,Qatar
- National Museum of Qatar - Doha,Qatar
- Hamad Hospital - Doha Qatar
- Hamad (Al Maha) Hospital - Wakra,Qatar
- Lusail Expressway, Qatar
- Construction of Al Bustan Street South Project -Sabah Al ahmad Corridor, Qatar
- Lusail Plaza Towers (Tower 3 & 4) - Lusail, Doha Qatar
- North–South Commuter Railway (Sucat-Calamba), Philippines

== Notable people ==
The former president of South Korea, Lee Myung-bak, was a former CEO of Hyundai Engineering and Construction.

== See also ==
- Suwon Hyundai Engineering & Construction
- Economy of South Korea
- CentGas consortium
- List of companies of South Korea
