= Gimpo Bridge =

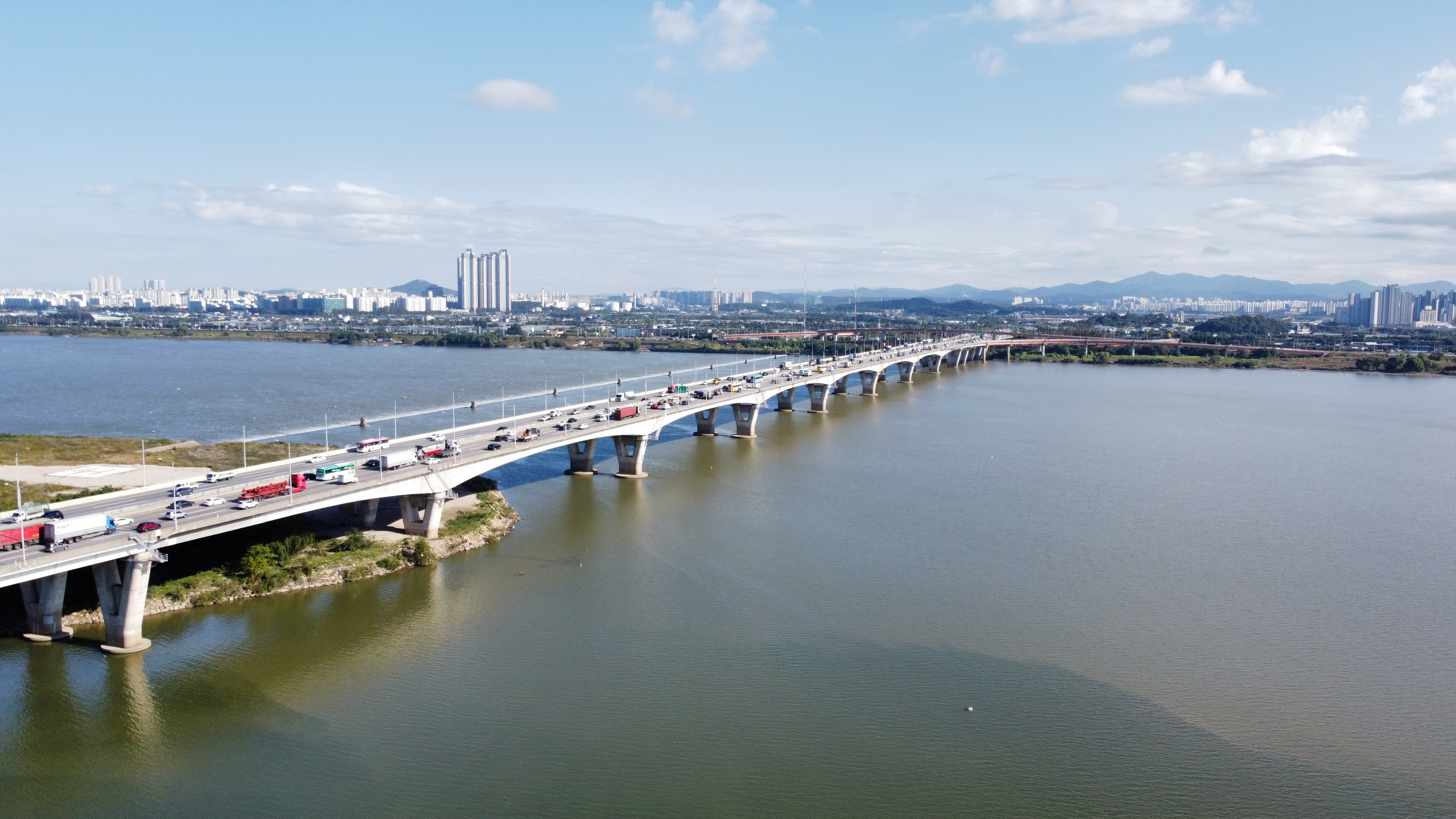
- Coordinates: 37.611886°N 126.793578°E
- Carries: Capital Region First Ring Expressway
- Crosses: Han River
- Locale: Gimpo to Goyang
- Preceded by: Haengju Bridge
- Followed by: Ilsan Bridge

Characteristics
- Design: Girder bridge
- Material: Deck: precast prestressed concrete
- Total length: 2,280 metres (7,480 ft)
- Width: deck: 38.21 metres (125.4 ft)
- Longest span: 125 metres (410 ft)

History
- Opened: 1997

Korean name
- Hangul: 김포대교
- Hanja: 金浦大橋
- RR: Gimpo daegyo
- MR: Kimp'o taegyo

Location
- Interactive map of Gimpo Bridge

The Gimpo Bridge (Korean: 김포대교) crosses the Han River, South Korea and connects the cities of Gimpo and Goyang. The bridge is a part of the Capital Region First Ring Expressway.

== See also ==
- Transportation in South Korea
- List of bridges in South Korea
