= DL E&C =

South Korean construction company

DL E&C Co., Ltd.
- Native name: 디엘이앤씨 주식회사
- Formerly: Daelim Industrial
- Type: Public
- Traded as: KRX: 375500
- Industry: Construction
- Founded: 4 January 2021
- Headquarters: Seoul, South Korea
- Key people: Park Sang-shin (CEO)
- Parent: DL Group
- Website: dlenc.co.kr

DL E&C Co., Ltd. (Korean: 디엘이앤씨 주식회사), formerly the construction division of Daelim Industrial, is a construction company headquartered in Seoul, South Korea.

The fields covered by DL E&C as one of the top EPC companies in Asia to the Middle East include gas, petroleum refining, chemical and petrochemical, power and energy plants, building and housing, civil works, and industrial facilities.it is also well known as an apartment developer, with its brand name being e편한세상.

== History ==
The Daelim Group of Industries started out in 1962 from Gyeongsangam-do.

== Notable projects ==
D&L E&C's notable construction projects include the 1915 Çanakkale Bridge, Sepung bridge, Geobukseon bridge, Cheong poong bridge and Brunei's Temburong Bridge. In 2013, Daelim was awarded Malaysia's 3A 1200MW power plant project (US$1.2 billion) and Oman's Sohar Refinery Expansion Project (US$1 billion).

== Shareholding structure ==
As of April 2023, based on common stock
Shareholder	Shareholding (%)
DL Group	23.15%
Daelim Educational Foundation	1.26%
National Pension Service	11.09%
Capital Group Companies	5.04%
Treasury Stock	1.85%

== See also ==
- Chaebol
