= Paryeong Bridge =

Suspension bridge in South Korea

Paryeong Bridge 팔영대교
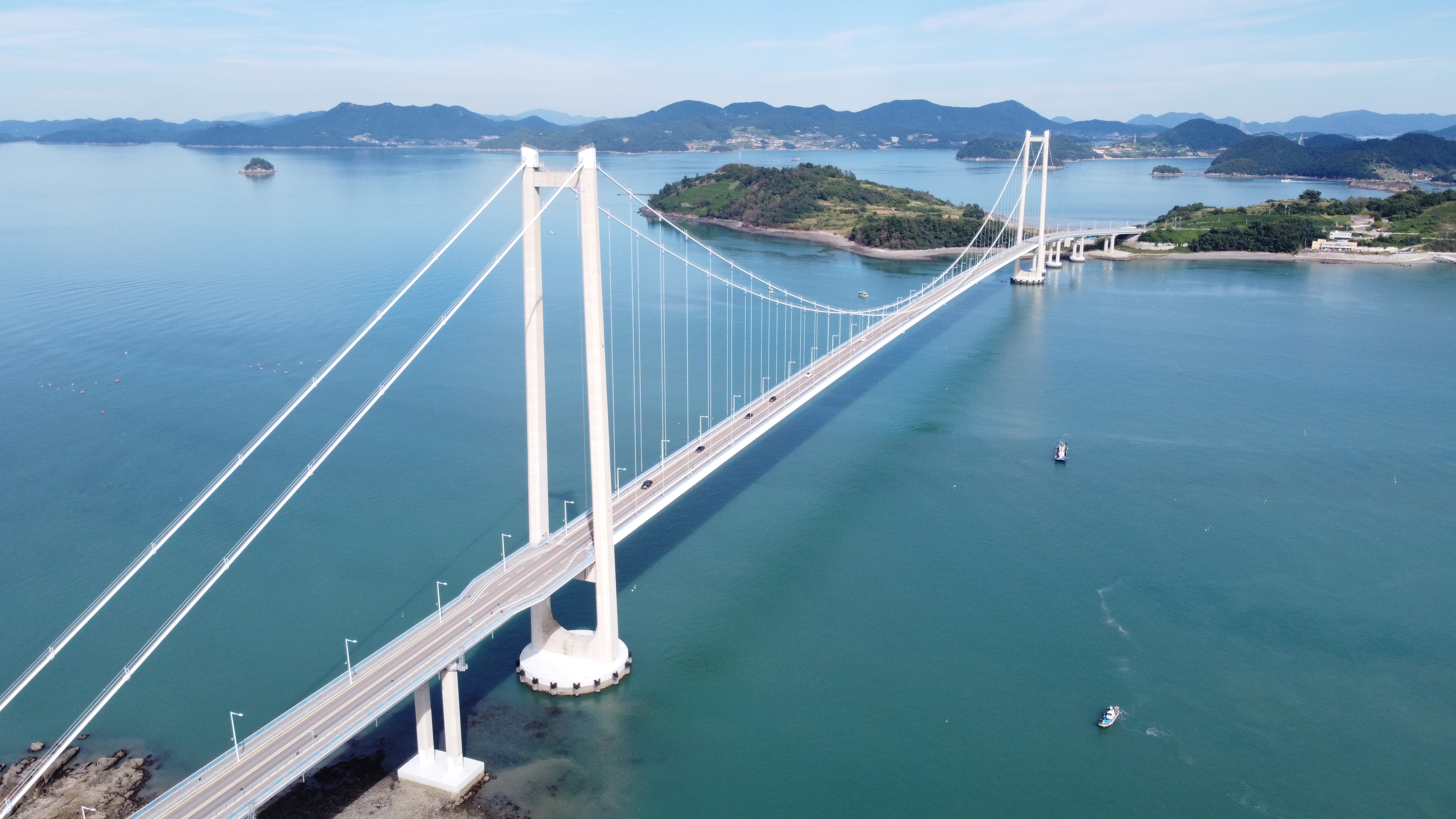
- Coordinates: 34°37′53.6″N 127°30′10.8″E
- Crosses: Sea of Japan
- Locale: Ucheon - Jeokgeum Island, South Korea

Characteristics
- Design: Suspension bridge
- Total length: 1,340 metres (4,400 ft)
- Longest span: 850 metres (2,790 ft)

History
- Opened: 27 december 2016

Paryeong Bridge (Hangul: 팔영대교) is a suspension bridge on the south coast of South Korea.

It is one of the 11 bridge projects connecting Yeosu City and Goheung County. It was built as part of the 2.97 km road construction project between Jeokgeum and Yeongnam. The total length of the bridge is 1,340 meters, with its main tower height reaching 138 meters.

== See also ==
- Transportation in South Korea
- List of bridges in South Korea
