= Koreans in Iran =

Ethnic group

Total population
- 100 (2025)

Regions with significant populations
- Tehran, Asaluyeh

Languages
- Persian; Korean

Religion
- Christianity · Buddhism · Other

Related ethnic groups
- Korean diaspora

Koreans in Iran have a history dating back to the 1970s, when South Korean labour migrants began flowing into the country. However, most returned home or moved on to other countries. In 2011, only 405 Koreans lived in the country. By 2025, there were around 100.

== Migration history ==
South Korean migration to Iran grew at an average annual rate of 90% between 1971 and 1977, although the total number of migrants from Korea grew only by an annual average of 18% during that same period; South Koreans departing their home country for Iran composed just 0.2% of all officially-registered emigrants in 1971 (roughly 150 individuals), and only 177 individuals in 1974, but 1.8% (2,402 individuals) in 1975 and 3.4% (6,264 individuals) in 1977. The vast majority were male. Hyundai Construction's first project in the entire Middle East was a 1975 contract for the construction of a shipyard for the Iranian Navy near Bandar Abbas, and they and other chaebol quickly expanded their business in the region. Between 1977 and 1979, nearly 300,000 South Korean workers from two dozen companies came to work in the Middle East. The largest proportion of those went to Saudi Arabia, though Iran was also a major destination; at one point, migration to Iran made up 17% of all migration to the region. In total, in the decade following 1975, 25,388 South Koreans went to Iran.

The 1979 Iranian Revolution would have a negative effect on South Korean business in Iran, as well as proving dangerous for Korean workers in the country; on one occasion, revolutionaries attacked a construction site seeking to drive away "foreign devils"; five workers were killed and twenty others injured in a traffic accident that arose as they fled. The Korean Air Force had to be called in to evacuate Korean nationals. The number of South Koreans going to Iran fell from 7,418 in 1978 to 64 in 1979 and only 30 in 1980, though by 1985 the rate of migration had recovered to almost half of its pre-revolutionary level, with 3,669 migrants. However, due to the economic effects of the revolution and the Iran–Iraq War, as well as South Korea's rising labour costs, the practise of importing labourers from South Korea to work in the Middle East slowly became less widespread during the late 1980s; for example, the proportion of Korean labourers working on construction projects for Hyundai declined from 70% to only 20-30%, with the shortfall being taken up by local labourers instead.

By 2009, only 614 South Korean nationals remained in the country. They consist primarily of government officials, corporate expatriates, and Koreans married to Iranians. By 2011, the number of South Korean nationals or former nationals in the country had shrunk further, to 405 persons. Among them, 42 (3 men, 39 women) had Iranian nationality, 20 were international students, and the remaining 342 had other kinds of visas. Most (315) lived in Tehran, with a smaller concentration of 32 at Asaluyeh.

North Koreans also have a presence in the country, mainly related to their assistance to Iran's nuclear program. According to The Los Angeles Times, there is one hotel in Tehran and another on the Caspian Sea coast set aside for the use of North Korean diplomats.

== Community organisations ==
The Korean Association of Iran (Korean: 이란한인회) was set up in 1970. Its president, Jo Seung-mi, graduated from Hanyang University and formerly worked as a ballet dancer. She met her Iranian husband while he was studying at the Seoul Agricultural College (now part of the University of Seoul) as an international student; in 1977, she followed him back to Iran. She was elected to her post in 1997. As of 2006, the association had roughly 300 members.

Iran's sole school for South Korean nationals, the Tehran Korean School (테헤란한국학교; also known as the Korean Embassy School), was established on 30 April 1976; it uses Korean as the primary medium of instruction, with English used for science and computer classes, and Persian offered as a foreign language. As of 2002, it enrolled 29 elementary-school students.

== See also ==
- Demographics of Iran
