= Cheonsa Bridge =

Road bridge in Jeollanam-do, South Korea

Cheonsa Bridge 천사대교 (Korean)
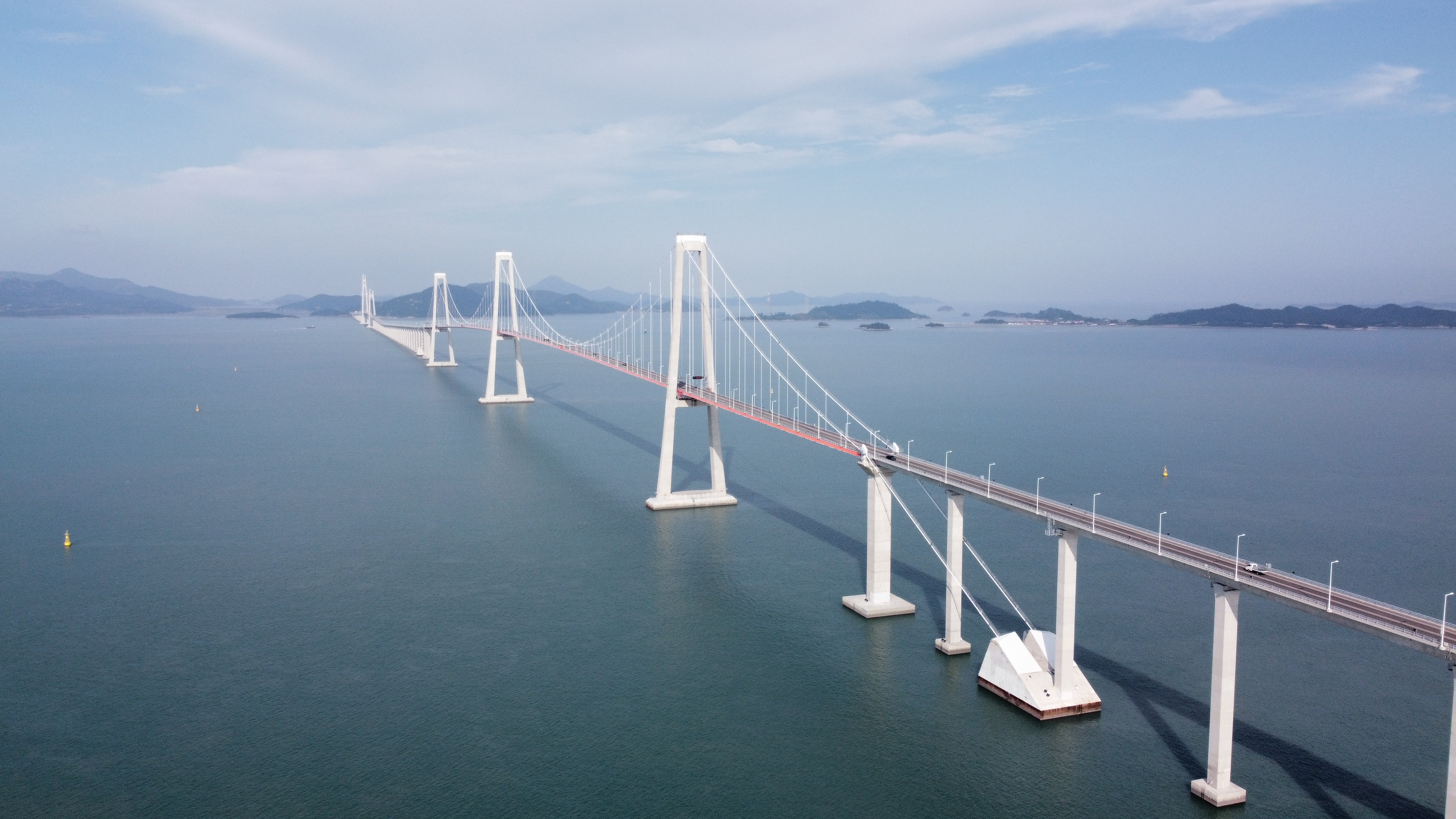
- Coordinates: 34°51′37.8″N 126°12′20.5″E
- Carries: National Route 2 (South Korea)
- Crosses: Yellow Sea
- Locale: Jeollanam-do, South Korea

Characteristics
- Design: Suspension bridge Cable-stayed bridge
- Total length: 7,224 metres (23,701 ft)
- Height: 164 metres (538 ft) (east bridge); 195 metres (640 ft) (west bridge)
- Longest span: 650 metres (2,130 ft) (east bridge); 510 metres (1,670 ft) (west bridge)

History
- Opened: 4 April 2019

Cheonsa Bridge (Korean: 천사대교) is a cross-sea bridge including a two main spans suspension bridge and an asymmetric cable-stayed bridge between Amtae Island and Aphae Island in the southwest coast of South Korea.

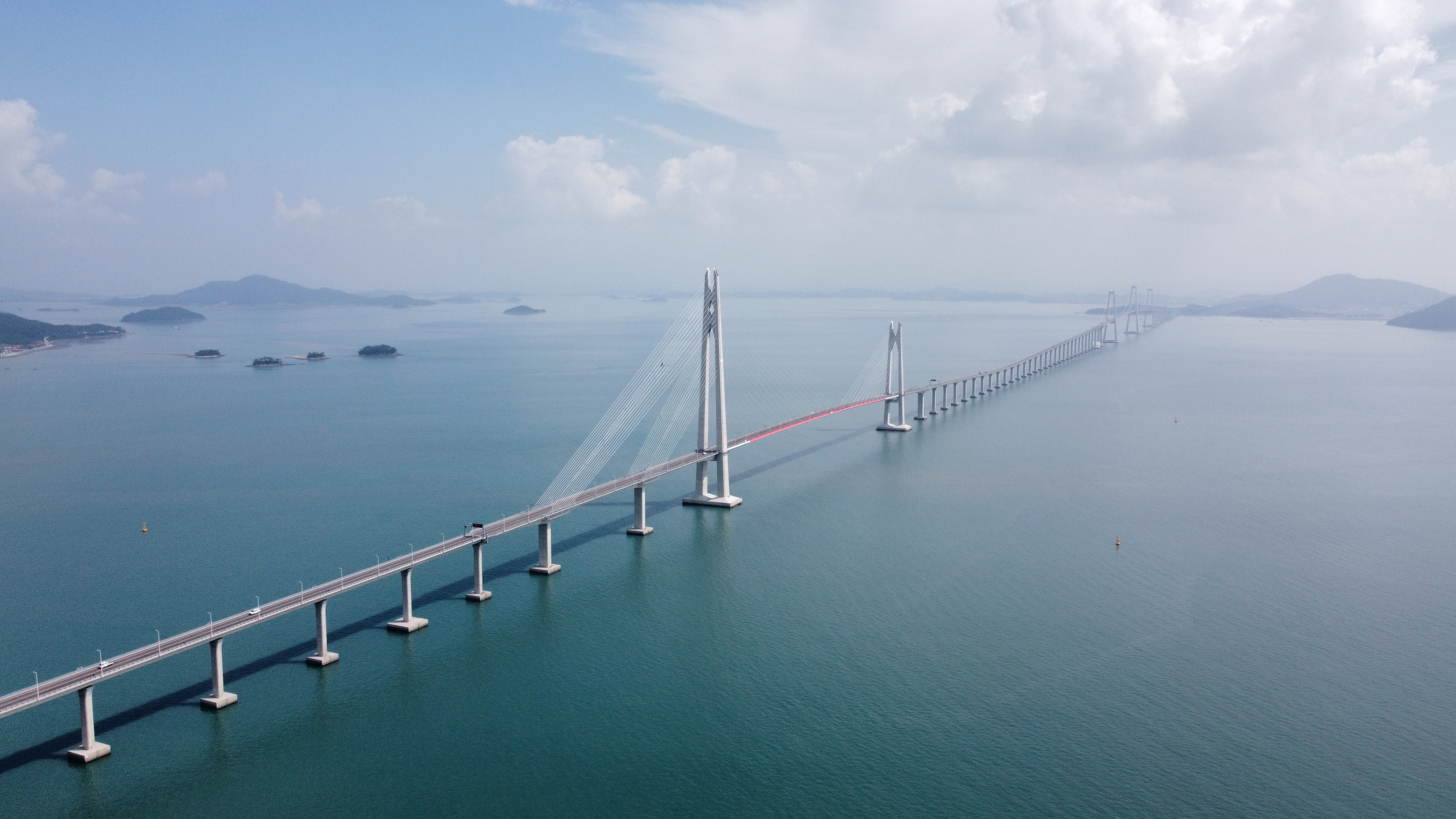
Bridge in September 2022

== See also ==
- Transportation in South Korea
- List of bridges in South Korea
