= Namhae Bridge =

Bridge in Noryang, South Korea

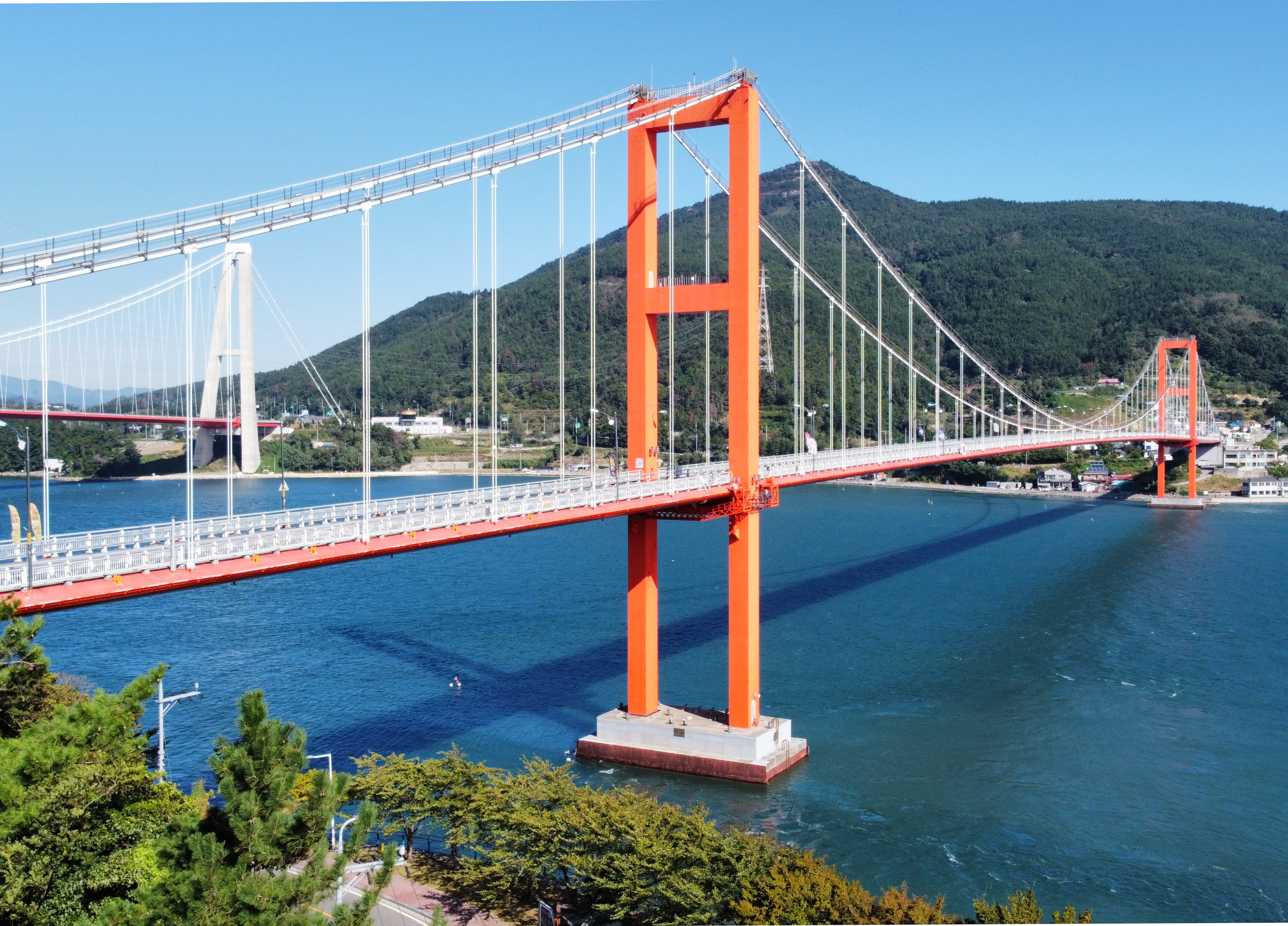
- Coordinates: 34°56′39.0″N 127°52′19.4″E
- Locale: Hadong Noryang and Namhae Noryang in South Korea

Characteristics
- Design: suspension bridge
- Total length: 660 metres (2,170 ft)
- Width: 9.6 metres (31 ft)
- Height: 80 metres (260 ft)
- Longest span: 404 metres (1,325 ft)

History
- Construction start: May 1968
- Construction end: 22 June 1973

Location
- Interactive map of Namhae Bridge

The Namhae Bridge (남해대교) is a suspension bridge that connects Hadong Noryang and Namhae Noryang, South Korea. The bridge, completed in 1973 has a total length of 660 meters. The bridge has a real-time monitoring system installed to monitor its performance.

== See also ==
- Busan
- Transportation in South Korea
- List of bridges in South Korea
