= Namhaedo =

Island in South Korea

- A panoramic view of Namhaedo
- Interactive map of Namhaedo

Geography
- Location: Korea Strait
- Coordinates: 34°47′N 127°55′E
- Area: 300 km^{2} (120 sq mi)
- Highest elevation: 786 m (2579 ft)
- Highest point: Mangun

Administration
- South Korea
- Province: South Gyeongsang
- Largest settlement: Namhae

Demographics
- Ethnic groups: Korean

Korean name
- Hangul: 남해도
- Hanja: 南海島
- RR: Namhaedo
- MR: Namhaedo

Namhaedo (Korean: 남해도) or Namhae Island is the principal island of Namhae County, on the southern coast of South Gyeongsang Province, South Korea. It is the fifth largest island in South Korea. Together with Changseon Island, it forms Namhae County. It is joined to land by Namhae Bridge.

== History ==
Namhaedo is where Korean admiral Yi Sun-sin died in 1598.

Chen Lin and Yi Sun-sin together helped defeat the Japanese at the Battle of Noryang, ending the Imjin War.

== See also ==
- Battle of Noryang
- Yi Sun-sin
- Chen Lin (Ming dynasty)
