= Jincheon Nongdari Bridge =

Bridge in Jincheon, South Korea

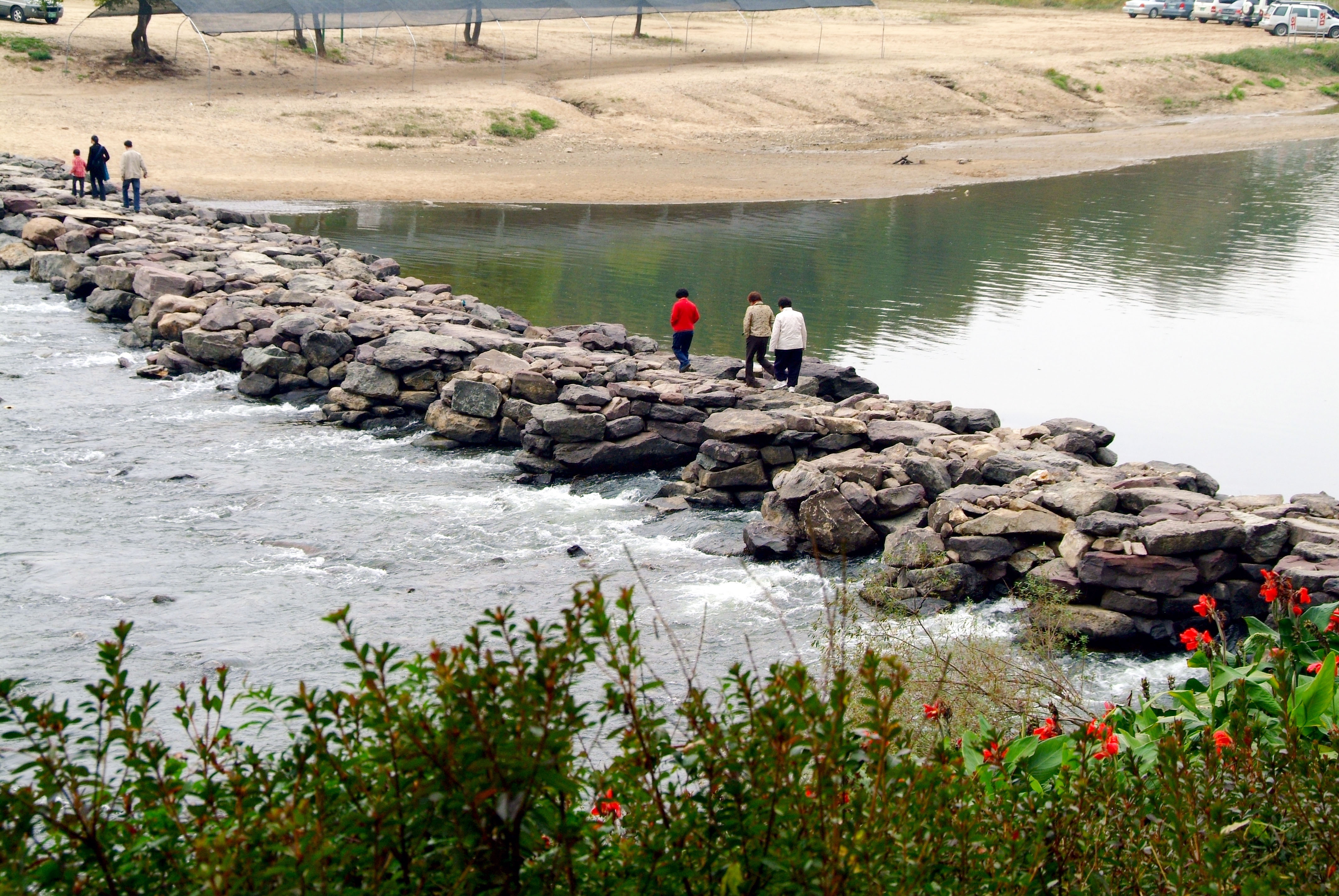
- Jincheon Nongdari Bridge
- Coordinates: 36°49′33″N 127°29′36″E
- Locale: North Chungcheong, South Korea

Characteristics
- Design: stone bridge
- Total length: 93 metres (305 ft)
- Width: 3.6 metres (12 ft)

Location
- Interactive map of Jincheon Nongdari Bridge

- Jincheon Nongdari Bridge
- Hangul: 진천 농다리
- Hanja: 鎭川 籠다리
- RR: Jincheon nongdari
- MR: Chinch'ŏn nongdari

Jincheon Nongdari Bridge (Korean: 진천 농다리) is South Korea's oldest stone bridge. Located in Jincheon County, North Chungcheong Province, this 93-meter long and 3.6-6m wide bridge was built over Sesecheon Stream on the orders of General Lim during the time of the Goryeo dynasty (918-1392). It was designated as a Tangible Cultural Property No. 28 of North Chungcheong Province on 21 December 1976.

The piers are 1.2 m thick and the span between the piers is 80cm. Originally there were 28 channels for the water to flow between the piers, but over time, some piers and channels were destroyed, and a project to restore the 24 channels to the original 28 channels was started in 2008, and completed in 2018.

The stones used in the piers were piled up like fish scales, and this method of construction meant that the piers were generally not destroyed even during rainy seasons. The unprecedented method of building the piers with small stones (and no binding material), and the civil engineering considerations used to prevent the piers from being lost make this a precious bridge.

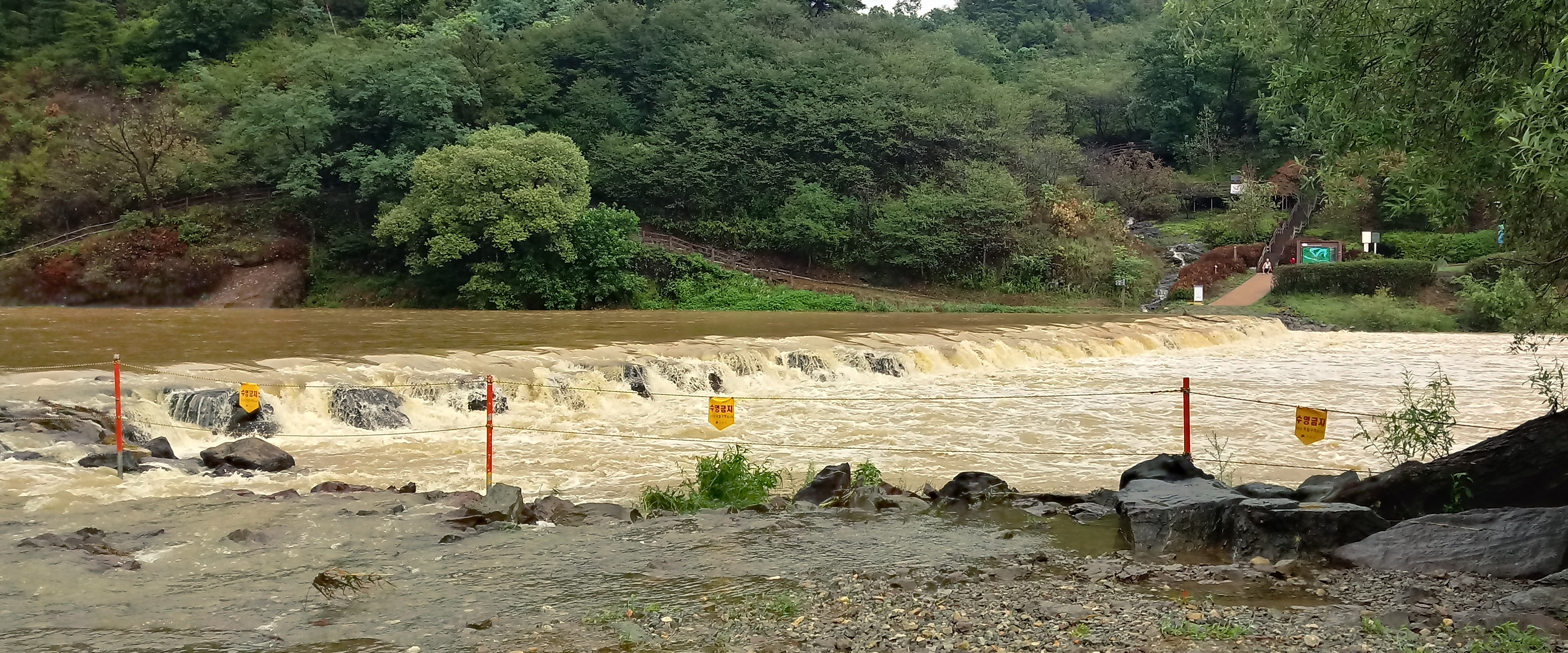
Nongdari flooded on 28 August 2018
