= Chungju Dam =

Dam in North Chungcheong, South Korea

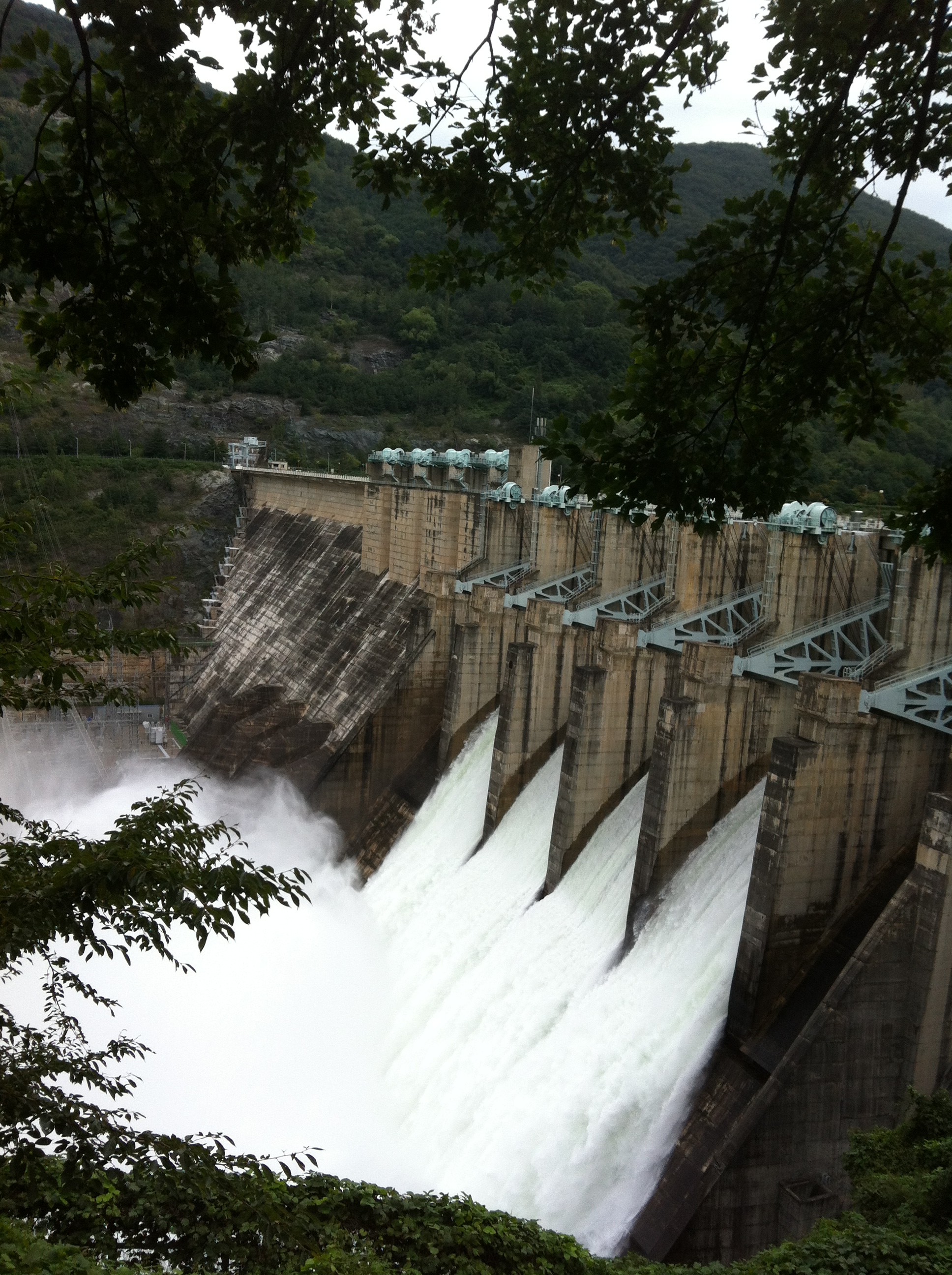

- Location within South Korea
- Country: South Korea
- Location: Chungju
- Coordinates: 37°00′22″N 127°59′33″E
- Status: Operational
- Construction began: 1978
- Opening date: 1985
- Owner: Korea Water Resources Corporation

Dam and spillways
- Type of dam: Gravity
- Impounds: Namhan River
- Height: 98 m (322 ft)
- Length: 447 m (1,467 ft)
- Dam volume: 0.902 million m^{3}

Reservoir
- Total capacity: 2,750,000,000 m^{3} (2,229,461 acre⋅ft)
- Active capacity: 1,789,000,000 m^{3} (1,450,366 acre⋅ft)
- Surface area: 50.8 km^{2}

Power Station
- Turbines: 4 x 100 MW Francis-type
- Installed capacity: 400 MW

The Chungju Dam is a gravity dam on the Namhan River, 6 km (4 mi) northeast of Chungju in Chungcheongbuk-do Province, South Korea. The purpose of the dam is flood control, water supply and hydroelectric power generation. Construction on the dam began in 1978 and was complete in 1985. The 98 m (322 ft) tall dam withholds a reservoir of 2,750,000,000 m^{3} (2,229,461 acre⋅ft) and supplies water to a 400 MW power station.

== See also ==
- List of power stations in South Korea
