= Taehwa River =

River in South Korea

Coordinates: 35.5512°N 129.3213°E

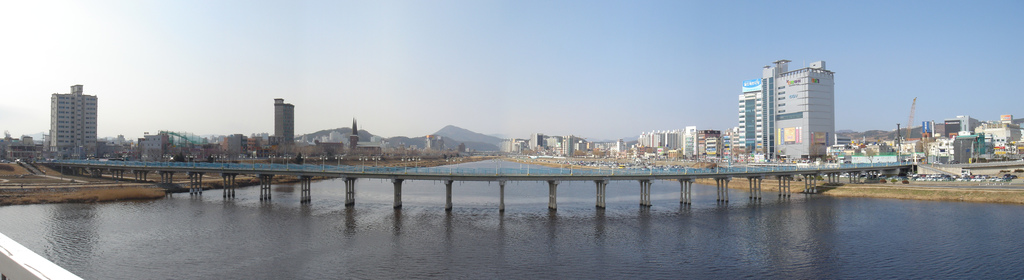
- View of Taehwa River from foot bridge, Seongnam-dong, Ulsan

Korean name
- Hangul: 태화강
- Hanja: 太和江
- RR: Taehwagang
- MR: T'aehwagang

The Taehwa River (Korean: 태화강) is a river in South Korea. It flows into Ulsan Bay. The river's entire 46-kilometer course lies within the metropolitan city of Ulsan. The Taehwa drains an area of nearly 645 km²; much of this lies within Ulsan, but portions of it lie in neighboring cities such as Gyeongju.

== See also ==
- List of rivers of Asia
- Rivers of Korea
- Geography of South Korea
