= Guri–Amsa Bridge =

Bridge in Seoul, South Korea

Coordinates: 37.5692°N 127.1321°E

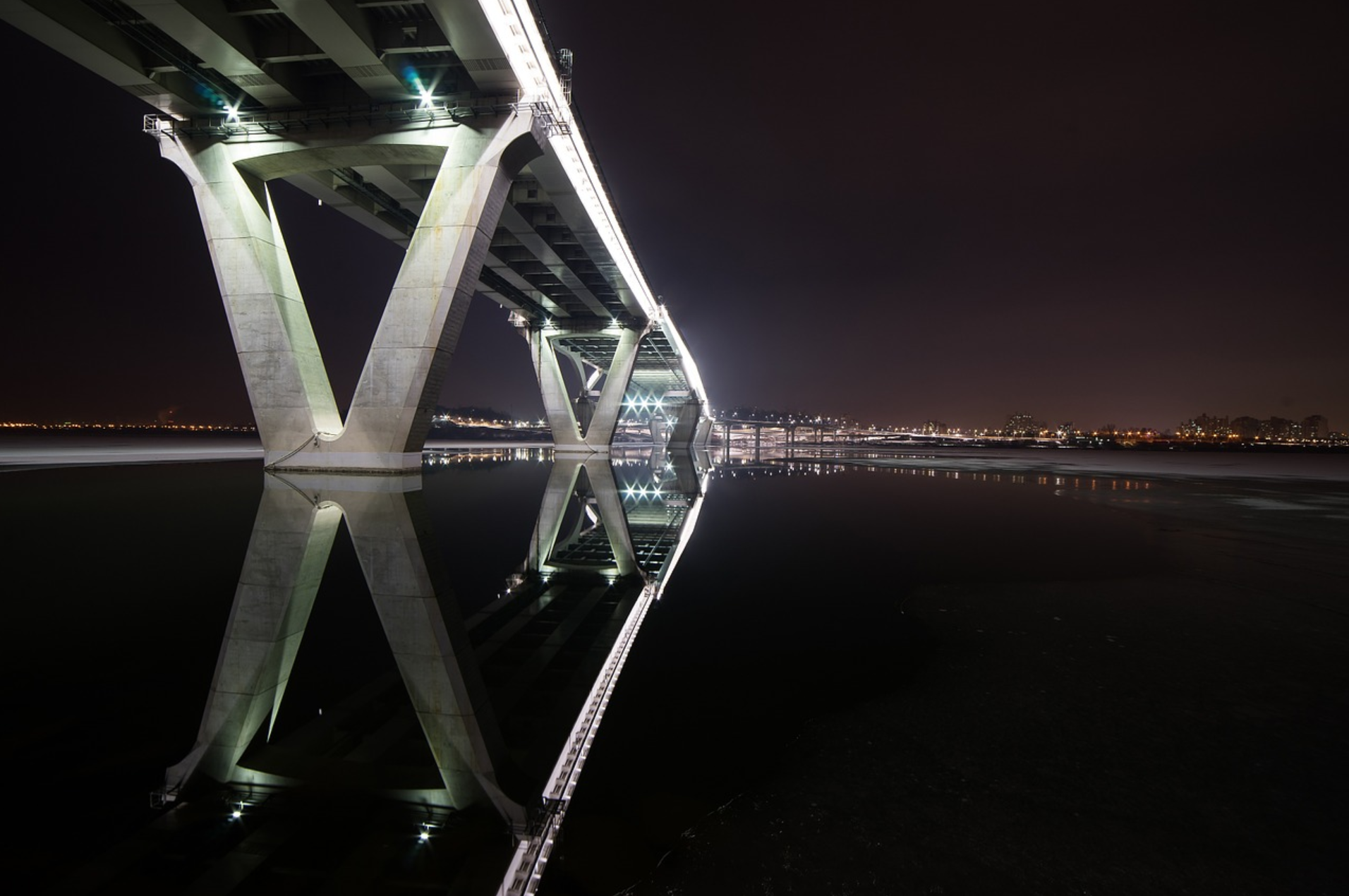
- View from below at night.

Korean name
- Hangul: 구리암사대교
- Hanja: 九里岩寺大橋
- RR: Guri Amsa daegyo
- MR: Kuri Amsa taegyo

The Guri–Amsa Bridge (Korean: 구리암사대교) crosses the Han River in South Korea and connects the city of Guri and Gangdong-gu (district) in Seoul.

Construction on the bridge began in September 2006, and there was controversy regarding the naming of the bridge. The Seoul City Naming Committee suggested "Amsa Bridge" in reference to Amsa-dong located in Gangdong, while the city of Guri suggested "Guri Bridge." Eventually, the Naming Committee compromised by naming the bridge "Guri–Amsa Bridge."

The bridge was partially opened on November 20, 2014, and opened in its entirety, including all entrances and exits, on June 29, 2015.
