= Gangdong Bridge =

Bridge in Seoul, South Korea

Coordinates: 35.9813°N 129.2658°E

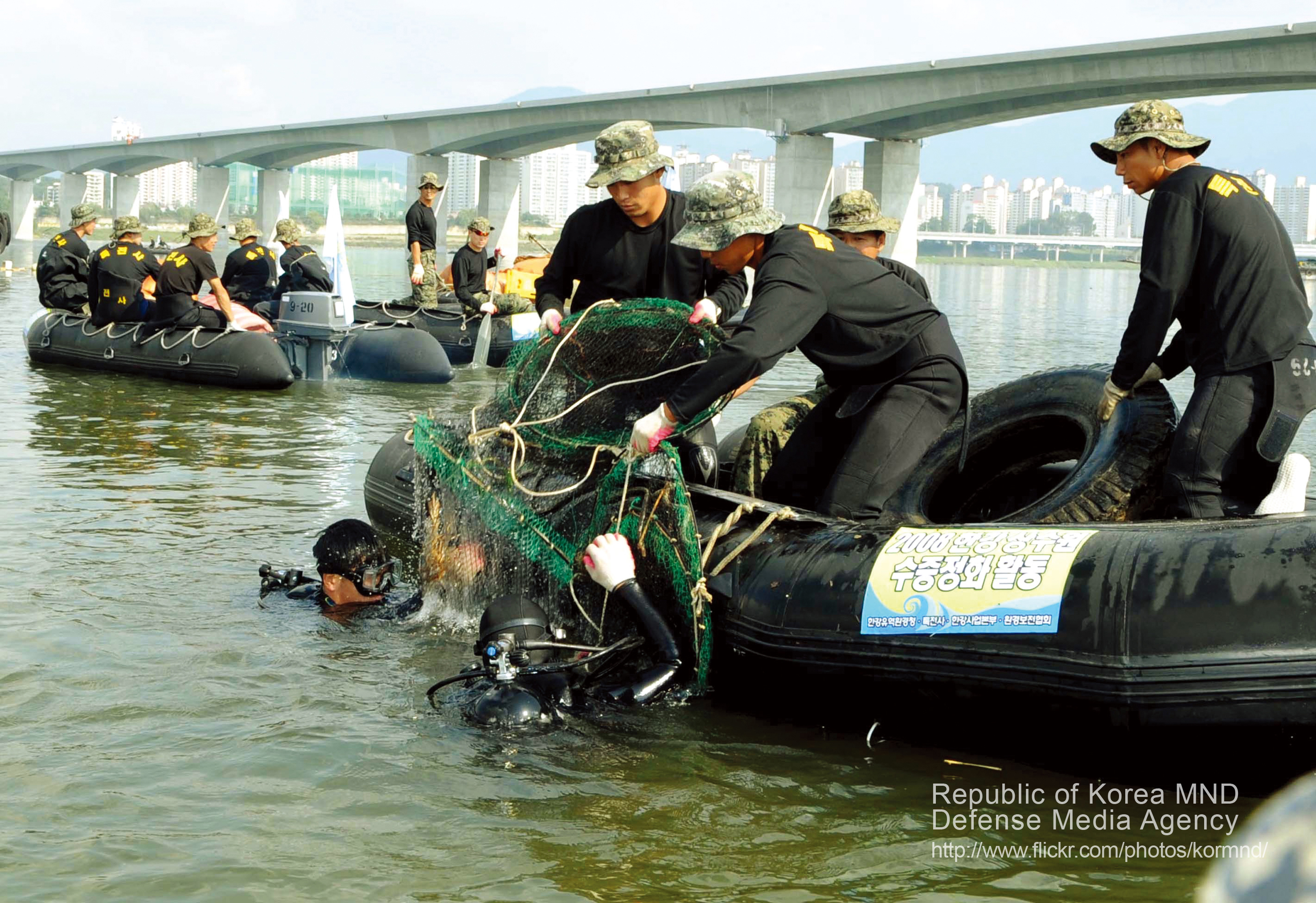
- Republic of Korea Army underwater cleaning activities, 2008.

Korean name
- Hangul: 강동대교
- Hanja: 江東大橋
- RR: Gangdong daegyo
- MR: Kangdong taegyo

The Gangdong Bridge (Korean: 강동대교) is a bridge in over the Han River, South Korea, and connects the city of Guri and the Gangdong District of Seoul. This bridge is in Gyeonggi Province and opened in 1991. It is part of the Capital Region First Ring Expressway.

== See also ==
- List of Han River bridges
