= List of rivers of Korea =

Major rivers of Korea.

The Korean Peninsula is mainly mountainous along its east coast, so most of its river water flows west, emptying into the Yellow Sea. Some of these rivers flow through lakes en route to the coast, but these are all artificial reservoirs, as there are no natural lakes on the Korean mainland. A few rivers head south, emptying into the Korea Strait and some more minor rivers flow east to the East Korea Bay, though these are usually little more than streams in comparison. In the list below, tributaries are listed under the river into which they flow and then in upstream order. They are listed counterclockwise, from the Amnok to the Duman.

== Main rivers of South Korea ==
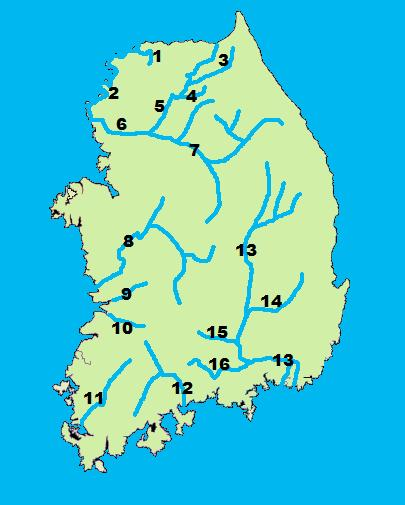
Map of Main Rivers of South Korea.

	Name	hangul	hanja
1	Hantan River	한탄강	漢灘江
2	Imjin River	임진강	臨津江
3	Soyang River	소양강	昭陽江
4	Hongcheon River	홍천강	洪川江
5	Bukhan River	북한강	北漢江
6	Han River	한강	漢江
7	Namhan River	남한강	南漢江
8	Geum River	금강	錦江
9	Mangyeong River	만경강	萬頃江
10	Dongjin River	동진강	東津江
11	Yeongsan River	영산강	榮山江
12	Seomjin River	섬진강	蟾津江
13	Nakdong River	낙동강	洛東江
14	Geumho River	금호강	琴湖江
15	Hwang River	황강	黃江
16	Nam River	남강	南江

== Main rivers of North Korea ==
- Bukhan River
- Chaeryong River
- Changja River
- Changjin River
- Chongchon River
- Han River
- Hantan River
- Hochon River
- Imjin River
- Kumya River
- Nam River
- Orang River
- Piryu River
- Pothong River
- Ryesong River
- Songchon River
- Taedong River
- Taeryong River
- Tumen River
- Yalu River

== Rivers flowing into the Yellow Sea (West Sea) ==
=== North of the Han River ===
- Yalu River, known in Korean as the "Amnok River" (압록강)
  - Aihe River (Joins Yalu River from Chinese side)
  - Anping River (Joins Yalu River from Chinese side)
  - Pushi River (Joins Yalu River from Chinese side)
  - Hunjiang River (渾江) (Joins Yalu River from Chinese side)
  - Yushulin River (Joins Yalu River from Chinese side)
- Taeryong River (대령강)
  - Ch'ongch'on River (청천강)
- Taedong River (대동강)
  - Chaeryong River (재령강)
- Ryesong River (예성강)
  - Handarinae (한다리내)
    - Jeongjacheon (정자천)
  - Rucheon (루천)
  - Ojocheon (오조천)

=== The Han River System ===
- Han River (한강)
  - Imjin River (임진강)
    - Munsancheon (문산천)
    - Seolmacheon (설마천)
    - Samicheon (사미천)
      - Jigocheon (지거천)
      - Sincheon (신천)
    - Ganghwacheon (강화천)
      - Sannaecheon (산내천)
    - Hantan River (한탄강)
      - Yeongpyeongcheon (영평천)
        - Pocheoncheon (포천천)
      - Guntangaeul (군탄개울)
    - Yeokgokcheon (역곡천)
  - Gongneungcheon (곡릉천)
    - Cheongnyongducheon (청룡두천)
    - Sapogyocheon (사포교천)
    - Gosancheon (고산천)
    - Wondangcheon (원당천)
    - Daejacheon (대자천)
    - Byeokjecheon (벽제천)
    - Seokhyeoncheon (석현천)
  - Seoamcheon (서암천)
    - Suchamcheon (수참천)
    - Bongseongpocheon (봉성포천)
      - Gamajicheon (가마지천)
      - Geomuldaecheon (거물대천)
  - Geolpohacheon (걸포하천)
    - Najinpocheon (나진포천)
      - Daebohacheon (대보하천)
      - Gyeyangcheon (계양천)
  - Hallyucheon (한류천)
  - Daebocheon (대보천)
  - Dochoncheon (도촌천)
  - Daejangcheon (대장천)
  - Haengsincheon (행신천)
  - Seobuganseoncheon (서부간선천)
  - Gulpocheon (굴포천)
    - Cheongcheoncheon (청천천)
  - Daedudukcheon (대두둑천)
  - Changneungcheon (창릉천)
    - Bukhancheon (북한천)
  - Anyangcheon (안양천)
    - Dorimcheon (도림천)
    - Mokgamcheon (목감천)
    - Samseongcheon (삼성천)
    - Hakuicheon (학의천)
    - Sanboncheon (산본천)
    - Dangjeongcheon (당정천)
    - Wanggokcheon (왕곡천)
  - Jungnangcheon (중랑천)
    - Cheonggyecheon (청계천)
    - Banghakcheon (방학천)
    - Hoeryongcheon (회룡천)
    - Baekseokcheon (백석천)
    - Buyongcheon (부용천)
      - Millakcheon (민락천)
    - Eoduncheon (어둔천)
    - Gwangsacheon (광사천)
    - Yuyangcheon (유양천)
  - Tancheon (탄천)
    - Yangjaecheon (양재천)
      - Yeouicheon (여의천)
      - Makgyecheon (막계천)
    - Changgokcheon (창곡천)
    - Segokcheon (세곡천)
    - Sangjeokcheon (상적천)
    - Yeosucheon (여수천)
    - Yatapcheon (야탑천)
    - Bundangcheon (분당천)
    - Dongmakcheon (동막천)
      - Songokcheon (손곡천)
    - Seongbokcheon (성복천)
      - Pungdeokcheon (풍덕천)
  - Seongnaecheon (성내천)
  - Godeokcheon (고덕천)
  - Wangsukcheon (왕숙천)
    - Yongamcheon (용암천)
    - Eumhyeoncheon (음현천)
    - Jinmokcheon (진목천)
  - Hongneuncheon (홍릉천)
  - Deoksocheon (덕소천)
  - Gyeongancheon (경안천)
    - Gonjiamcheon (곤지암천)
      - Nogokcheon (노곡천)
    - Mokhyeoncheon (목현천)
    - Jingnicheon (직리천)
    - Gosancheon (고산천)
    - Neungwoncheon (능원천)
    - Chohacneon (초하천)
    - Sindaecheon (신대천)
    - Geumeocheon (금어천)
    - Daedaecheon (대대천)
    - Yangjicheon (양지천)
    - Geumhakcheon (금학천)
  - Bukhan River (북한강)
    - Byeokgyecheon (벽계천)
    - Guuncheon (구운천)
      - Oebangcheon (외방천)
        - Buldanggolcheon (불당골천)
    - Jojongcheon (조종천)***Yangguseocheon (양구서천)
    - Munhocheon (문호천)
    - Hongcheon River (홍천강)
      - Jungbangdaecheon (중방대천)
        - Myeongseongcheon (명성천)
      - Dumicheon (두미천)
      - Yangdeokwoncheon (양덕원천)
      - Goijicheon (골지천)
      - Seongdongcheon (성동천)
      - Deokchicheon (덕치천)
      - Guneopcheon (군업천)
      - Seongsancheon (성산천)
      - Hwayang River (화양강)
        - Naechoncheon (내촌천)
    - Dumilcheon (두밀천)
    - Gapyeongcheon (가평천)
      - Seungancheon (승안천)
      - Hwaakcheon (화악천)
    - Gangchoncheon (강촌천)
    - Palmicheon (팔미천)
    - Gongjicheon (공지천)
    - Soyang River (소양강)
      - Mancheoncheon (만천천)
      - Yulmuncheon (율문천)
        - Mujigolcheon (무지골천)
      - Jinaecheon (지내천)
      - Naerincheon (내린천)
        - Garisancheon (가리산천)
      - Deoksancheon (덕산천)
      - Bukcheon (북천)
      - Inbukcheon (인북천)
    - Wolsongcheon (월송천)
    - Jiamcheon (지암천)
    - Jichoncheon (지촌천)
    - Gyeseongcheon (계성천)
    - Hwacheoncheon (화천천)
    - Yangguseocheon (양구서천)
      - Hanjeoncheon (한전천)
      - Cheongnicheon (청리천)
  - Namhan River (남한강)
    - Gajeongcheon (가정천)
    - Bokpocheon (복포천)
    - Satancheon (사탄천)
    - Yanggeuncheon (양근천)
    - Dogokcheon (도곡천)
    - Heukcheon (흑천)
      - Yeonsucheon (연수천)
      - Yongmuncheon (용문천)
      - Buancheon (부안천)
    - Yongdamcheon (용담천)
    - Bokhacheon (복하천)
      - Sinduncheon (신둔천)
      - Jungnicheon (중리천)
      - Jangamcheon (장암천)
      - Wonducheon (원두천)
      - Dongsancheon (동산천)
      - Gwanricheon (관리천)
    - Yanghwacheon (양화천)
      - Maeyucheon (매유천)
      - Yanghwacheon (West)
        - Chojicheon (초지천)
          - Doricheon (도리천)
      - Yanghwacheon (East)
        - Ganam Bonducheon (가남본두천)
        - Angeumcheon (안금천)
      - Hancheon (한천)
      - Soyangcheon (소양천)
      - Geumdangcheon (금당천)
      - Yeonyangcheon (연양천)
        - Jeombongcheon (점봉천)
      - Cheongmicheon (청미천)
        - Geumgokcheon (금곡천)
        - Gwanhancheon (관한천)
        - Naraecheon (나래천)
        - Chapyeongcheon (차평천)
        - Seokwoncheon (석원천)
        - Juksancheon (죽산천)
          - Yongseolcheon (용설천)
        - Bangchocheon (방초천)
    - Seom River (섬강)
      - Bupyeongcheon (부평천)
      - Gungchoncheon (궁촌천)
      - Seogokcheon (서곡천)
        - Maejicheon (매지천)
      - Wonjucheon (원주천)
      - Oksancheon (옥산천)
      - Jeoncheon (전천)
        - Hasunamcheon (하수남천)
      - Gyecheon (계천)
        - Daegwandaecheon (대관대천)
    - Mokmicheon (복미천)
    - Hwangsancheon (환산천)
    - Angseongcheon (앙성천)
    - Hanpocheon (한포천)
    - Yeongdeokcheon (영덕천)
      - Wongokcheon (원곡천)
      - Songgangcheon (송강천)
    - Daejeoncheon (대전천)
    - Dalcheon (달천)
      - Chungjucheon (충주천)
      - Yodocheon (요도천)
        - Bisancheon (비산천)
      - Seongmundongcheon (석문동천)
      - Eumseongcheon (음성천)
      - Dongjincheon (동진천)
        - Seonghwangcheon (성황천)
      - Ssangcheon (쌍천)
    - Jecheoncheon (제천천) (also known as Jupocheon 주포천)
      - Wonseocheon (원서천)
      - Palsongcheon (팔송천)
    - Danyangcheon (단양천)
    - Jungnyeongcheon (죽령천)
      - Namjocheon (남조천)
        - Olsancheon (올산천)
    - Daegacheon (대가천)
    - Eosangcheon (어상천)
    - Saiwoncheon (사이원천)
      - Sajiwoncheon (사지원천)
    - Namcheon (남천)
    - Okdongcheon (옥동천)
    - Pyeongchang River (평창강) (western fork of Namhan River)
      - Seo River (서강)
      - SSangyongcheon (쌍용청)
      - Mudochdon (무도천)
      - Jucheon River (주천강)
        - Songhancheon (송한천)
        - Hwangduncheon (황둔천)
        - Unhakcheon (운학천)
        - Gangnimcheon (강림천)
      - Gyechoncheon (계촌천))
    - Dong River (동강) (eastern fork of Namhan River)
      - Seokhangchon (석항천)
      - Jijangcheon (지장천)
      - Changnicheon (창리천)
      - Joyang River (조양강) (name of upper section of Dong River)
        - Yongtancheon (용탄천)
        - Eocheon (어천)
        - Odaecheon (오대천)
        - Goljicheon (골지천) (name of upper section of Joyang River)
          - Songcheon (송천)
          - Imgyecheon (임계천)
            - Imgyecheon (north) (임계천(북))
            - Imgyecheon (south) (임계천(남))

=== Between the Han River and the Geum River ===
- Seokjeongcheon (석정천)
- Geomdancheon (검단천)
- Gyeonginarabaetgil (경인아라뱃길) (canal - connects to Han River)
- Gongchoncheon (공촌천)
- Simgokcheon (심곡천)
- Jangsucheon (장수천)
- Unyeoncheon (운연천)
- Botongcheon (보통천)
- Donghwacheon (동화천)
  - Ansancheon (안산천)
    - Hwajeongcheon (화정천)
  - Banwolcheon (반월천)
- Jaancheon (자안천)
- Barancheon (발안천)
  - Suchoncheon (수촌천)
  - Hwadangcheon (화당천)
- Anseongcheon (안성천)
  - Chodaecheon (초대천)
  - Sapgyocheon (삽교천)
    - Namwoncheon (남원천)
    - Gokgyocheon (곡교천)
      - Bonggangcheon (봉강천) (name for upper section of Gokgyocheon)
    - Muhancheon (무한천)
      - Sinyangcheon (신양천)
        - Hwasancheon (화산천)
    - Geummacheon (금마천)
  - Jinwicheon (진위천)
    - Jwagyocheon (좌교천)
    - Gwanlicheon (관리천)
    - Hwanggujicheon (황구지천)
      - Sujikcheon (수직천)
      - Seorangcheon (서랑천)
      - Anyeongcheon (안영천)
      - Yangjeongcheon (양정천)
      - Sammicheon (삼미천)
      - Banjeongcheon (반정천)
      - Woncheollicheon (원천리천)
        - Jangdaricheon (장다리천)
        - Usijangcheon (우시장천)
        - Yeocheon (여천) (also known as Uisangcheon 의상천)
          - Sanuisilcheon (상의실천)
          - Seongjukcheon (성죽천)
            - Jeolgolcheon (절골천)
          - Sanuicheon (산의천)
          - Araesoejukgolcheon (아래쇠죽골천)
            - Soejukgolcheon (쇠죽골천)
              - Dongnyeoksoejukgolcheon (동녁쇠죽골천)
        - Gasancheon (가산천)
      - Suwoncheon (수원천)
        - Munamgolcheon (문암골천)
        - Gwanggyocheon (광교천)
          - Mukgolcheon (묵골천)
            - Changsacheon (창사천)
            - Changsahacheon (창사하천)
      - Seohocheon (서호천)
        - Maesancheon (매산천)
        - Jeongjacheon (정자천) (also known as Yeonghwacheon 영화천)
          - Songjukcheon (송죽찬)
          - Jowoncheon (조원천)
        - Imokcheon (이목천)
      - Homaesilcheon (호매실천)
      - Geumgokcheon (금곡천)
      - Ilwolcheon (일월천)
        - Yulcheoncheon (율천천)
      - Dangsucheon (당수천)
      - Omanggolcheon (오망골천)
      - Bugokcheon (부곡천)
      - Geumcheon (금천)
    - Osancheon (오산천)
  - Doeolcheon (도얼천)
  - Ipjangcheon (입장천)
  - Hancheon (한천)
- Yongjangcheon (용장천)
- Sapgyocheon (삽교천)
  - Namwoncheon (남원천)
  - Gokgyocheon (곡교천)
    - Eumbongcheon (음봉천)
    - Omokcheon (오목천)
    - Onyangcheon (온양천)
      - Geumgokcheon (금곡천)
    - Cheonancheon (천안천)
      - Maegokcheon (매곡천)
      - Bonggangcheon (봉강천)
        - Yongcheon (river) (용천)
        - Pungsecheon (풍세천)
  - Dogocheon (도고천)
  - Muhancheon (무한천)
  - Seogucheon (석우천)
  - Hyogyocheon (효교천)
  - Daechicheon (대치천)
  - Geummacheon (금마천)
- Chodaecheon (초대천)
- Janggeomcheon (장검천)
- Daegyocheon (대교천)
  - Cheongjicheon (청지천)
- Gumnicheon (굼리천)
- Sangjicheon (상지천)
  - Jinjukcheon (진죽천)
  - Gwancheoncheon (관천천)
- Gyoseongcheon (교성천)
- Bongdamcheon (봉담천)
- Daecheoncheon (대천천)
  - Hwangnyongcheon (황룡천)
- Nampocheon (남포천)
- Ungcheoncheon (웅천천)
  - Singucheon (신구천)
- Chongcheoncheon (총천천)
- Pangyocheon (판교천)

=== The Geum River system ===
- Geum River (금강)
  - Gilsancheon (길산천)
  - Hwasancheon (화산천)
  - Wonsacheon (원사천)
  - Chilsancheon (칠산천)
  - Sanbukcheon (산북천)
    - Hamilcheon (함일천)
  - Sadongcheon (사동천)
  - Nonsancheon (논산천)
    - Ganggyeongcheon (강경천)
      - Eoryangcheon (어량천)
      - Masancheon (마산천)
    - Bangchukcheon (방축천)
    - Noseongcheon (노성천)
      - Yeonsancheon (연산천)
  - Seokseongcheon (석성천)
    - Yeonhwacheon (연화천)
  - Geumcheon (금천)
    - Guryongcheon (구룡천)
  - Eunsancheon (은산천)
    - Sumokcheon (수목천)
      - Ilgwangcheon (일광천)
  - Jicheon (지천)
    - Janggokcheon (장곡천)
    - Guryongcheon (구룡천)
    - Bongamcheon (봉암천)
    - Daechicheon (대치천)
  - Inghwadalcheon (잉화달천)
  - Jungpyeongcheon (중평천)
  - Chicheon (치천)
    - Gayacheon (가야천)
  - Eocheon (어천)
  - Yugucheon (유구천)
    - Daeryongcheon (대룡천)
  - Jemincheon (제민천)
  - Jeongancheon (정안천)
  - Hyeoljeocheon (혈저천)
  - Wangchoncheon (왕촌천)
  - Daegyocheon (대교천)
  - Miho River (미호강)
    - Wolhacheon (월하천)
    - Jocheon (조천)
    - Byeongcheoncheon (병천천)
      - Yongducheon (용두천)
      - Sanbangcheon (산방천)
    - Seongnamcheon (석남천)
    - Musimcheon (무심천)
      - Yulcheon (율천)
    - Sokhwacheon (석화천)
    - Seongamcheon (성암천)
    - Bogangcheon (보강천)
    - Chopyeongcheon (초평천)
      - Gunjacheon (군자천)
    - Baekgokcheon (백곡천)
    - Hancheon (한천)
    - Jangyangcheon (장양천)
    - Guamcheon (구암천)
  - Gapcheon (갑천)
    - Gwanpyeongcheon (관평천)
    - Yudeungcheon (유등천)
    - Yuseongcheon (유성천)
      - Banseokcheon (반석천)
    - Jinjamcheon (진잠천)
      - Hwasancheon (화산천)
    - Maenocheon (매노천)
    - Geumgokcheon (금곡천)
    - Dugyecheon (두계천)
  - Juwoncheon (주원천)
  - Hoeincheon (회인천)
  - Sookcheon (소옥천) (also known as Seohwacheon [서화천])
  - Bocheongcheon (보청천)
    - Samgacheon (삼가천)
    - Hanggeoncheon (항건천)
      - Geohyeoncheon (거현천)
  - Chogangcheon (초강천)
  - Yeongdongcheon (영동천)
  - Cheonnae River (천내강)
    - Bonghwangcheon (봉황천)
  - Namdaecheon (남대천)
    - Jeoksangcheon (적상천)
  - Jujacheon (주자천)
  - Jeongjacheon (정자천)
  - Daeyangcheon (대양천)

=== South of the Geum River ===
- Mangyeong River (만경강)
  - Tapcheon (탑천)
  - Yongamcheon (용암천)
  - Jeonjucheon (전주천)
    - Samcheon (삼천)
  - Soyangcheon (소양천)
  - Gosancheon (고산천)
- Sinpyeongcheon (신평천)
- Wonpyeongcheon (원평천)
  - Duwolcheon (두원천)
  - Geumgucheon (금구천)
- Dongjin River (동진강)
  - Gobucheon (고부천)
  - Jeongeupcheon (정읍천)
    - Cheonwoncheon (천원천)
- Jusangcheon (주상천)
- Jiksocheon (직소천)
- Sinchangcheon (신창천)
- Galgokcheon (갈곡천)
- Jujincheon (주진천)
  - Seonuncheon (선운천)
  - Yongsancheon (용산천)
  - Sasincheon (사신천)
  - Gochangcheon (고찬천)
    - Gosucheon (고수천)
      - Wachoncheon (와촌천)
  - Gangnamcheon (강남천)
    - Juksncheon (죽산천)
    - Goracheon (고라천)
  - Pyeongjicheon (평지천)
    - Sagokcheon (사곡천)
- Watancheon (와탄천)
  - Guamcheon (구암천)
- Bulgapcheon (불갑천)
  - Gunnamcheon (군남천)
- Dorimcheon (도림천)
  - Jisancheon (지산천)
  - Cheonggyecheon (청계천)
- Yeongsan River (영산강)
  - Mangwolcheon (망월천)
  - Yeongamcheon (영암천)
    - Haksancheon (학산천)
    - Hodongcheon (호동천)
    - Manghocheon (망호천)
  - Sampo River (삼포강)
  - Hampyeongcheon (함평천)
    - Hakgyocheon (학교천)
  - Gomakwoncheon (고막원천)
  - Munpyeongcheon (문평천)
  - Manbongcheon (만봉천)
    - Geumcheon (금천)
      - Annocheon (안노천)
  - Bonghwangcheon (봉황천)
  - Yeongsancheon (영산천)
  - Najucheon (나주천)
  - Jangseongcheon (장성천)
    - Gamjeongcheon (감정천)
  - Jiseokcheon (지석천)
    - Sanpocheon (산포천)
    - Daechoncheon (대촌천)
    - Nodongcheon (노동천)
    - Daechocheon (대초천)
      - Jeongcheon (정천)
    - Hwasuncheon (화순천)
    - Hancheoncheon (한천천)
    - Songseokcheon (송석천)
  - Pyeongdongcheon (평동천)
  - Hwangnyong River (황룡강)
    - Pyeongnimcheon (평림천)
    - Gaecheon (개천)
  - Gwangjucheon (광주천)
    - Jungsimsacheon (중심사천)
  - Pungyeongjeongcheon (풍영정천)
  - Jeungamcheon (증암천)
    - Changpyeongcheon (창평천)
      - Samcheoncheon (삼천천)
    - Seokgokcheon (석곡천)
    - Jungangcheon (중앙천)
  - Oryecheon (오례천)
  - Subukcheon (수북천)
  - Yongcheon (용천)
    - Wolsancheon (월산천)
      - Jungwolcheon (중월천)
  - Geumseongcheon (금성천)
- Okcheoncheon (옥천천)
  - Gahakcheon (가학천)
  - Gyegokcheon (계곡천)
  - Wolpyeongcheon (월평천)
- Geumjacheon (금자천)
- Gocheonamcheon (고천암천)
  - Samsancheon (삼산천)
- Gusancheon (구산천)
  - Hyeonsancheon (현산천)
    - Gohyeoncheon (고현천)
  - Wolsongcheon (월송천)
- Songjicheon (송지천)
- Sanjeongcheon (산정천)

== Rivers flowing into the Korea Strait (South Sea) ==
=== Ddang-ggeut to the Seomjin River ===
- Donghaecheon (동해천)
- Wolseongcheon (월성천)
- Hongchoncheon (홍촌천)
  - Yeongsucheon (영수천)
  - Unjeoncheon (운전천)
- Doamcheon (도암천)
  - Sanincheon (산인천)
- Gangjincheon (강진천)
  - Chunjeoncheon (춘전천)
- Tamjin River (탐진강)
  - Geumsacheon (금사천)
  - Pasancheon (파산천)
  - Gundongcheon (군동천)
  - Dangsancheon (당산천)
  - Geumgangcheon (금강천)
    - Byeongyeongcheon (병영천)
    - Hakdongcheon (학동천)
    - Seongjeoncheon (성전천)
    - Wolsancheon (월산천)
  - Budongcheon (부동천)
  - Naeancheon (내안천)
  - Busancheon (부산천)
    - Geumjacheon (금자천)
    - Hogyecheon (호계천)
    - Wolgokcheon (월곡천)
  - Omcheoncheon (옴천천)
    - Sinwolcheon (신월천)
      - Wolamcheon (월암천)
    - Hwanggokcheon (황곡천)
      - Sindeokcheon (신덕천)
  - Yuchicheon (유치천)
    - Hancheoncheon (한천천)
      - Sangchoncheon (상촌천)
    - Banwolcheon (반월천)
    - Gwandongcheon (관동천)
  - Yongmuncheon (용문천)
  - Tamjincheon (탐진천) (the upper reaches of the Tamjin River)
    - Bongdeokcheon (봉덕천)
    - Unwolcheon (운월천)
- Chillyangcheon (칠량천)
  - Janggyecheon (장계천)
  - Myeongjucheon (명주천)
- Daegucheon (대구천)
- Maryangcheon (마량천)
- Sangheungcheon (상흥천)
- Daedeokcheon (대덕천)
  - Yeonjeongcheon (연정천)
  - Pyeongchoncheon (평촌천)
- Goeupcheon (고읍천)
  - Sinpyeongcheon (신평천)
    - Seongnamcheon (석남천)
- Namsangcheon (남상천)
  - Mosancheon (모산천)
  - Seokdongcheon (석동천)
  - Sinheungcheon (신흥천)
    - Wolsongcheon (월송천)
- Sumuncheon (수문천)
  - Sinchoncheon (신촌천)
- Bonggangcheon (봉강천)
- Hoecheoncheon (회천천)
- Hwajukcheon (화죽천)
- Deungnyangcheon (득량천)
  - Songgokcheon (송곡천)
- Yedangcheon (예당천)
- Joseongcheon (조성천)
  - Inaecheon (이내천)
- Duwoncheon (두원천)
  - Sajeongcheon (사정천)
    - Hoeryongcheon (회룡천)
  - Undaecheon (운대천)
  - Bansancheon (반산천)
- Yongsancheon (용산천)
- Goeupcheon (고읍천)
- Dohwacheon (도화천)
- Goheungcheon (고흥천)
  - Sinheungcheon (신흥천)
- Songsancheon (송산천)
- Gangsancheon (강산천)
- Daegangcheon (대강천)
  - Waucheon (와우천)
    - Cheongsongcheon (청송천)
  - Pandeokcheon (판덕천)
    - Danggokcheon (당곡천)
      - Ssangamcheon (쌍암천)
    - Jangwolcheon (장월천)
- Beolgyocheon (벙교천)
  - Childongcheon (칠동천)
  - Nakancheon (낙안천)
    - Gyochoncheon (교촌천)
      - Undongcheon (운동천)
- Dongnyongcheon (동룡천)
- Suncheondongcheon (순천동천)
  - Haeryongcheon (해룡천)
  - Isacheon (이사천)
    - Sangsacheon (상사천)
      - Jogokcheon (조곡천)
    - Seokhongcheon (석홍천)
      - Mokchoncheon (목촌천)
        - Geumsancheon (금산천)
    - Namjeongcheon (남정천)
    - Seonamsacheon (선암사천)
    - Sinseongcheon (신성천)
    - Ssangamcheon (쌍암천)
      - Wolnaecheon (월내천)
  - Okcheon (옥천)
  - Seokhyeoncheon (석현천)
  - Suncheonseocheon (순천서천)
    - Unpyeongcheon (운평천)
  - Pyeonggokcheon (평곡천)
- Pyeongchoncheon (평촌천)
  - Yeonhwacheon (연화천)
- Hwayangcheon (화양천)
- Yeondeungcheon (연등천)
- Sangamcheon (상암천)
- Ssangbongcheon (쌍봉천)
  - Soracheon (소라천)
  - Jusamcheon (주삼천)
- Indeokcheon (인덕천)
  - Gwangyangseocheon (곽양서천)
    - Eongmancheon (억만천)
    - Gwangyangdongcheon (광양동천)
      - Chusancheon (추산천)
      - Donggokcheon (동곡천)
    - Gusangcheon (구상천)
    - Sinnyongcheon (신룡천)
- Sueocheon (수어천)
  - Okgokcheon (옥곡천)
    - Jeongtocheon (정토천)
    - Supyeongcheon (수평천)
  - Ungdongcheon (웅동천)

=== The Seomjin River to the East Coast ===
- Seomjin River (섬진강)
  - Boseong River (보성강)
- Nakdong River (낙동강)
  - Miryang River (밀양강)
  - Nam River (남강)
    - Gyeongho River (경호강)
  - Hwang River (황강)
  - Geumho River (금호강)
    - Sincheon (신천)
  - Yeong River (영강)

== Rivers flowing into the Sea of Japan (East Sea) ==
- Jangancheon (장안천)
  - Yongsocheon (용소천)
- Hyoamcheon (효암천)
  - Hwasancheon (화산천)
- Hoeya River (회야강)
  - Namchangcheon (남창천)
  - Daebukcheon (대북천)
  - Cheongokcheon (천곡천)
  - Junamcheon (주남천)
- Oehang River (외항강)
  - Cheongnyangcheon (청량천)
    - Duwangcheon (두왕천)
    - Namcheon (남천)
- Taehwa River (태화강)
  - Yeocheoncheon (여천천)
  - Myeongchoncheon (명촌천)
    - Yangjeongcheon (양정천)
    - Jinjangcheon (진장천)
  - Dongcheon River (동천강)
    - Songjeongcheon (송정천)
    - Dongcheon (동천) (Upper part of the Dongcheon River)
  - Cheokdongcheon (척동천)
  - Mubeopcheon (무법천)
  - Guksucheon (국수천)
  - Daegokcheon (대곡천)
    - Guryangcheon (구량천)
    - Mihocheon (미호천)
  - Sangcheoncheon (상천천)
    - Jakcheoncheon (작천천)
    - Gacheoncheon (가천천)
- Eomulcheon (어물천)
  - Bangbangcheon (방방천)
- Jeongjacheon (정자천)
  - Muryongcheon (무룡천)
- Sinmyeongcheon (신명천)
- Gwanseongcheon (관성천)
- Haseocheon (하서천)
- Hyeongsan River (형산강)
  - Gigyecheon (기계천)
  - Bukcheon (북천)
- Wangpicheon (왕피천)
- Nam River (남강)
- Geumya River (금야강)
- Seongcheon River (성천강)
- Namdaecheon (남대천)
- Bukdaecheon (북대천)
- Eorangcheon (어랑천)
- Suseongcheon (수성천)
- Tumen River, known in Korean as the "Duman River" (두만강)

== Rivers flowing into the Songhua River ==
- Samdobaekha (삼도백하)
- Paekduchon (백두천)

== Rivers of Jeju-do ==
(Clockwise from Jeju City Hall)

- Sanjicheon (산지천)
- Hwabukcheon (화북천)
  - Burokcheon (부록천)
  - Bangcheon (방천)
- Samsucheon (삼수천)
- Cheonmicheon (천미천)
- Gasicheon (가시천)
  - Anjwacheon (안좌천)
  - Songcheon (송천)
- Sinheungcheon (신흥천)
- Uigwicheon (의귀천)
- Seojungcheon (서중천)
- Jinpocheon (진포천)
- Jongnamcheon (종남천)
- Sillyecheon (신례천)
- Hyodoncheon (효돈천)
  - Yeongcheon (영천)
    - Donghongcheon (동홍천)
- Sanghyocheon (상효천)
  - Bomokcheon (보목천)
- Donghongcheon (동홍천)
- Seohongcheon (서홍천)
  - Hogeuncheon (호근천)
- Akgeuncheon (악근천)
  - Sechocheon (세초천)
- Gangjeongcheon (강정천)
  - Gungsancheon (궁산천)
  - Dosuncheon (도순천)
- Hoesucheon (회수천)
  - Donghoesucheon (동회수천)
- Jungmuncheon (중문천)
  - Saekdalcheon (색달천)
- Yeraecheon (예래천)
- Changgocheon (창고천)
- Hallimcheon (한림천)
  - Gwideokcheon (귀덕천)
- Geumseongcheon (금성천)
- Susancheon (수산천)
- Sowangcheon (소완천)
- Goseongcheon (고성천)
- Musucheon (무수천)
  - Dogeuncheon (도근천)
    - Eosicheon (어시천)
  - Gwangryeongcheon (광령천)
- Wonjangcheon (원장천)
- Ihocheon (이호천)
- Hancheon (한천)
  - Byeongmuncheon (병문천)
    - Sanjicheon (산지천)
  - Tocheon (토천)

== See also ==
- List of rivers
- List of waterfalls in South Korea
- Geography of South Korea
- Geography of North Korea
