= Sincheon =

Sincheon or Sinch'ŏn can refer to several things in South and North Korea:

- Sincheon (Gyeonggi), a stream in northern Gyeonggi province
- Sincheon (Daegu), a stream in Daegu
- Sincheon-dong (disambiguation), several neighborhoods
- Sinchon County, in South Hwanghae Province, North Korea
- Sinchon Hot Springs in North Hwanghae Province, North Korea
- Sincheon Station (Seoul) on the Seoul Subway Line 2
- Sincheon Station (Daegu Metro) on the Daegu Subway Line 1
