= Dorimcheon =

River in South Korea

Coordinates: 37°31′N 126°53′E

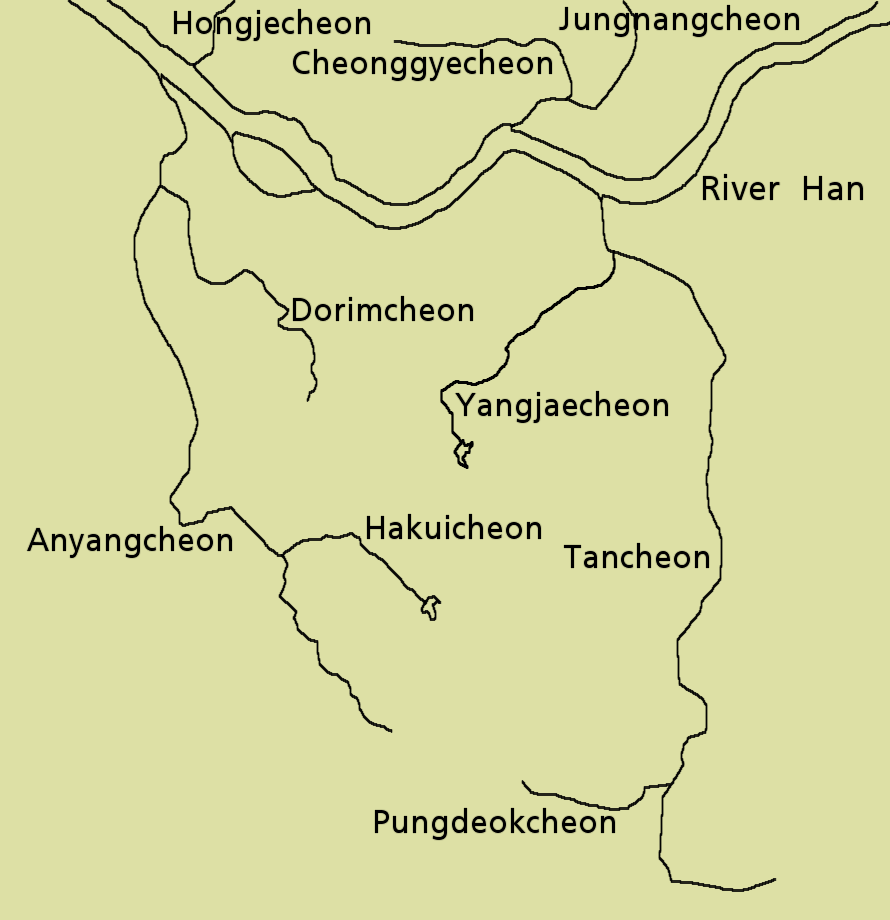

Korean name
- Hangul: 도림천
- Hanja: 道林川
- RR: Dorimcheon
- MR: Torimch'ŏn

The Dorimcheon (Korean: 도림천) is a river in Seoul, South Korea. It has its source in the valley between Gwanaksan and Samseongsan in southern Seoul and flows north, past Seoul National University. From Sillim Station to Daerim Station, it is covered by Line 2 of the Seoul Subway, which is elevated above the stream for this distance, so it is still possible to walk alongside the waterway. The river empties into the Anyangcheon 250m beyond the western the end of Dorimcheon Station's platforms.

== Gallery ==
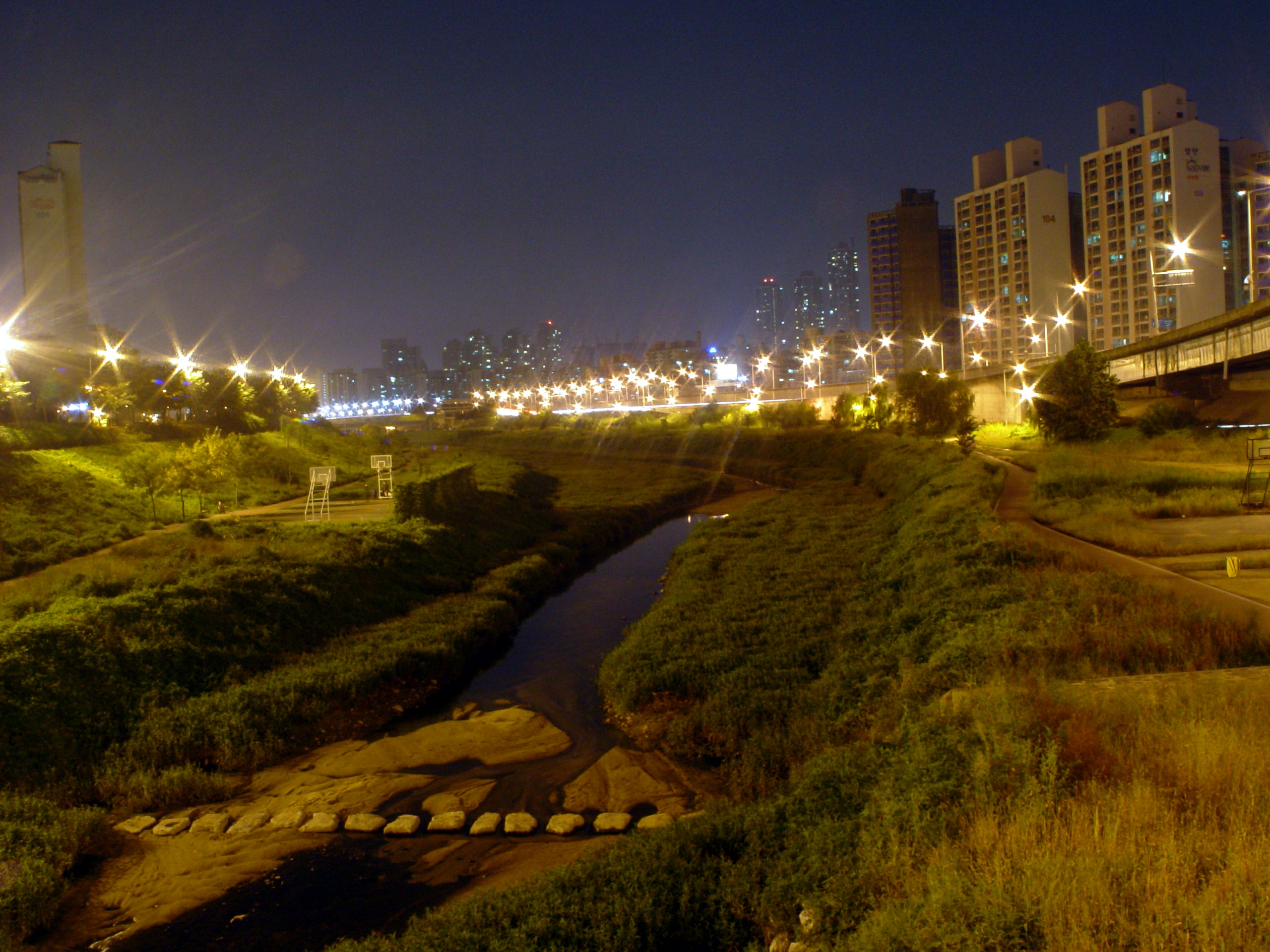
The Dorimcheon seen from Sindorim Station Bridge

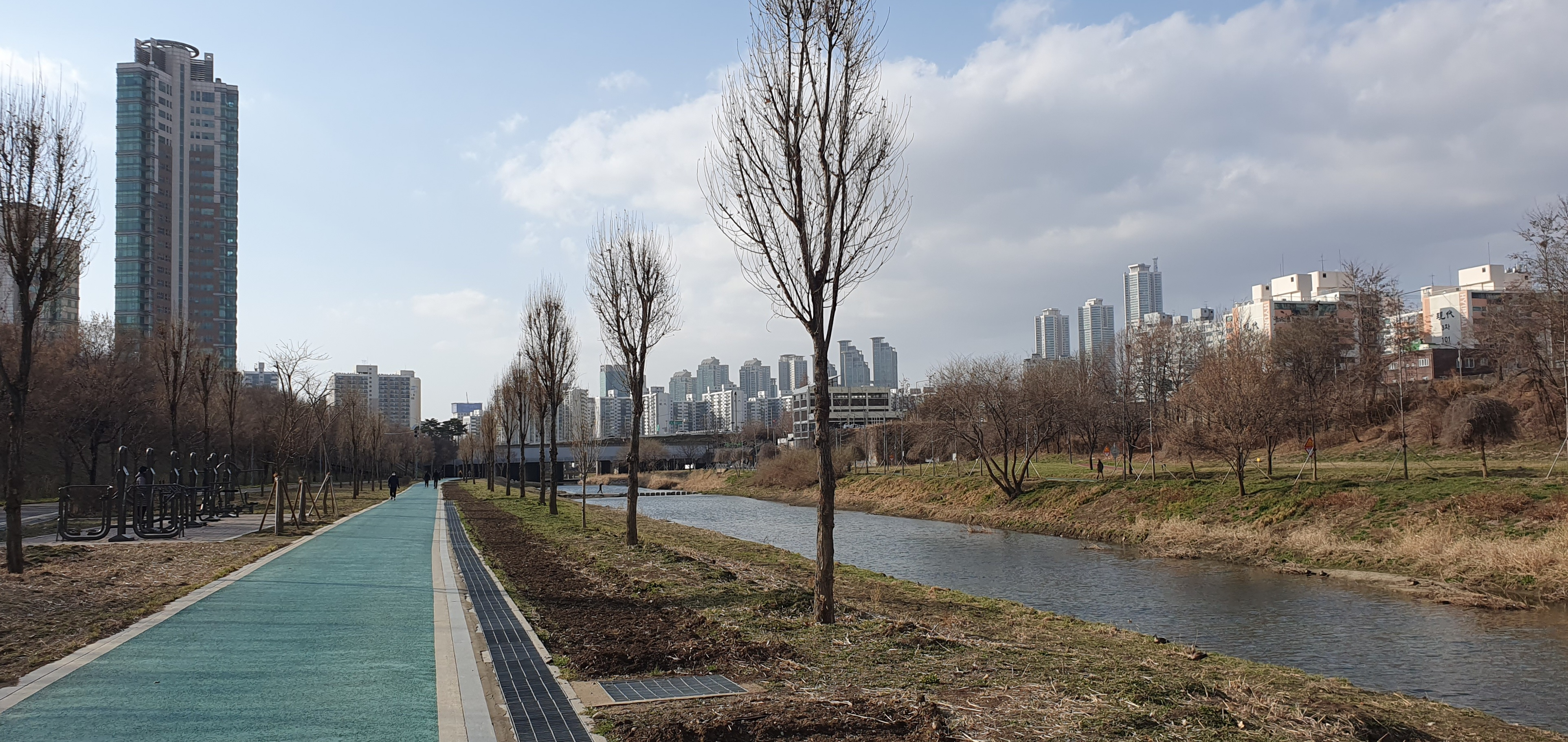
Looking downstream along the Dorimcheon near the Anyangcheon

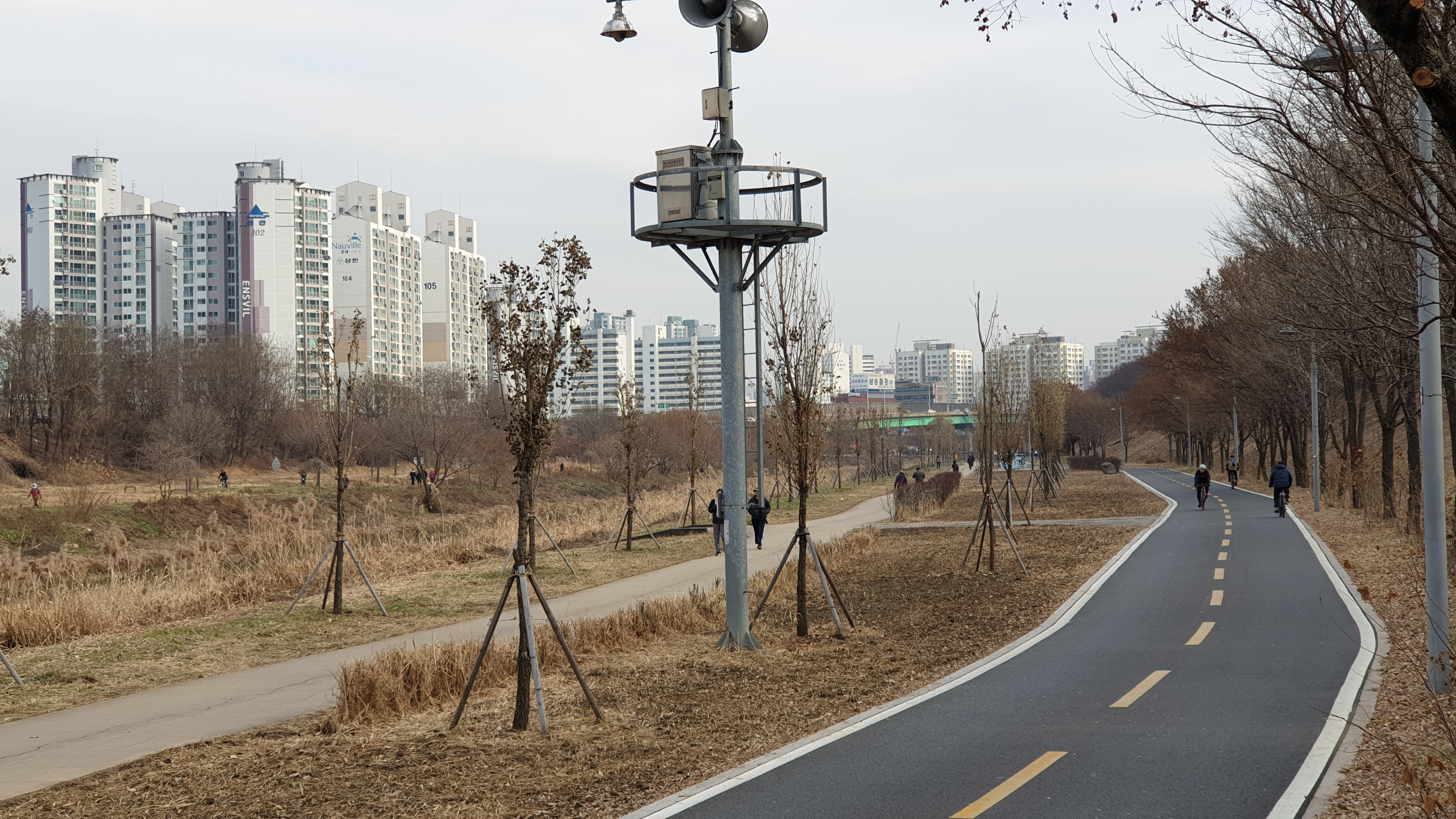
Cycle path alongside the Dorimcheon

== See also ==
- Rivers of Korea
- Geography of South Korea
