= Bundangcheon =

Short stream in Bundang, South Korea

- Hangul: 분당천
- Hanja: 盆唐川
- RR: Bundangcheon
- MR: Pundangch'ŏn

Bundangcheon (Korean: 분당천) is a short stream in Bundang, South Korea. Its source is the reservoir in Yul-dong Park and it then runs through Central Park (Jungang Park), under the main road through Bundang, past Bundang Gu Office, to join the Tancheon.

== See also ==
- Rivers of Korea
- Geography of South Korea
