= Extreme points of South Korea =

The following lists include extreme and significant points of the geography of South Korea.

== Extreme points ==
=== Overall ===
Heading	Location	Village and township or town	City or county	Province or metropolitan city	Coordinates	Note
Northernmost	Daegang-ri	Daegang-ri, Hyeonnae-myeon	Goseong-gun	Gangwon	38°36′40″N 128°21′51″E	
Southernmost	Marado	Daejeong-eup	Seogwipo-si	Jeju	33°6′37″N 126°15′42″E	
Easternmost	Dokdo (Liancourt Rocks)	Dokdo-ri, Ulleung-eup	Ulleung-gun	North Gyeongsang	37°14′27″N 131°52′20″E	The ownership of the territory is contested by Japan.
Westernmost	Baengnyeongdo	Baengnyeong-myeon	Ongjin-gun	Incheon	37°57′29″N 124°36′42″E	

=== Mainland ===
Heading	Location	Village and township or town	City or county	Province or metropolitan city	Coordinates	Note
Northernmost	Daegang-ri	Daegang-ri, Hyeonnae-myeon	Goseong-gun	Gangwon	38°36′40″N 128°21′51″E	Same as the overall northernmost point
Southernmost	Ttangkkeut	Songho-ri, Songji-myeon	Haenam-gun	South Jeolla	34°17′32″N 126°31′28″E	
Easternmost	Seokbyeong-ri	Seokbyeong-ri, Guryongpo-eup	Pohang-si	North Gyeongsang	36°1′0″N 129°35′5″E	
Westernmost	Mohang-ri	Mohang-ri, Sowon-myeon	Taean-gun	South Chungcheong	36°46′22″N 126°06′42″E	

== Extreme altitudes ==
Heading	Name	Altitude	Location	Coordinates
Highest	Hallasan	1,947.06 m	Jeju	33°21′42″N 126°31′45″E
Highest (mainland)	Jirisan	1,915 m	South Gyeongsang	35°20′13″N 127°43′50″E
Lowest	Sea of Japan (East Sea)	0 m		40°N 135°E

== See also ==
- Geography of South Korea
- Extreme points of Asia
- Extreme points of the Earth
- Lists of extreme points
