= Geumho River =

Tributary of the Nakdong River

Coordinates: 35.817°N 128.479°E

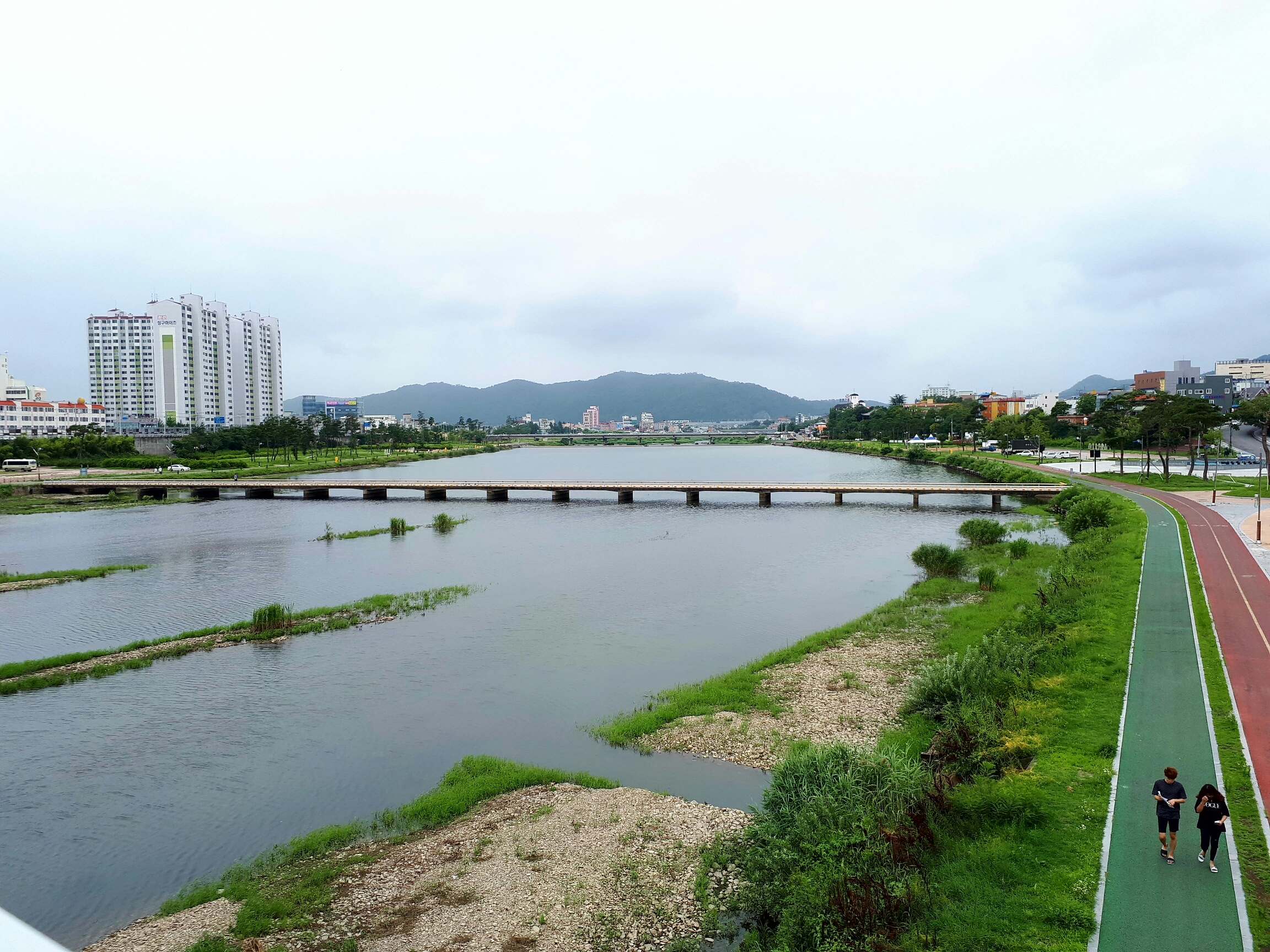

- Location within South Korea

Physical characteristics
- Mouth: Nakdong River
- Length: 116 km (72 mi)
- Basin size: 2,000 km^{2} (770 mi^{2})

Korean name
- Hangul: 금호강
- Hanja: 琴湖江
- RR: Geumhogang
- MR: Kŭmhogang

The Geumho River (Korean: 금호강) flows through North Gyeongsang Province, South Korea, and drains into the Nakdong River. It rises in the hilly area of western Pohang, flows west for 116 kilometers before meeting with the Nakdong in western Daegu. It drains an area of more than 2,000 square kilometers. Notable tributaries include the Sincheon, which flows north through Daegu. The name Geumhogang means "river of the zither-shaped lake," a reference to its oxbow curve in northern Daegu. Much of the riverbank in Daegu has been transformed into parkland.

== Ecological conditions ==
The Geumho has been among the most polluted rivers in South Korea largely because of industrial waste from nearby large-scale dyeing operations. This is especially critical because the Geumho is a tributary of the Nakdong river. The Geumho water samples have consistently received low grades on the water grading system of the Korean government. Communities allege that the water quality problem stemmed from the development of the Wicheon complex. The regional environment office of Daegu reported a new ecological plan to improve water quality around the rivers in 2008, including improvement of water circulation and the rivers' ecosystems.

== See also ==
- List of rivers of Korea
- Geography of South Korea
