= Jinyang =

Jinyang may refer to:

- Jinyang County, a county in Liangshan Yi Autonomous Prefecture, Sichuan, China
- Jinyang Lake, a lake in Korea
- Jinyang New District, a new urban district of the city of Guiyang, Guizhou, China
- Taiyuan, formerly named Jinyang, city in Shanxi, China
