= Seomjin River =

River in South Korea

Seomjin River 섬진강
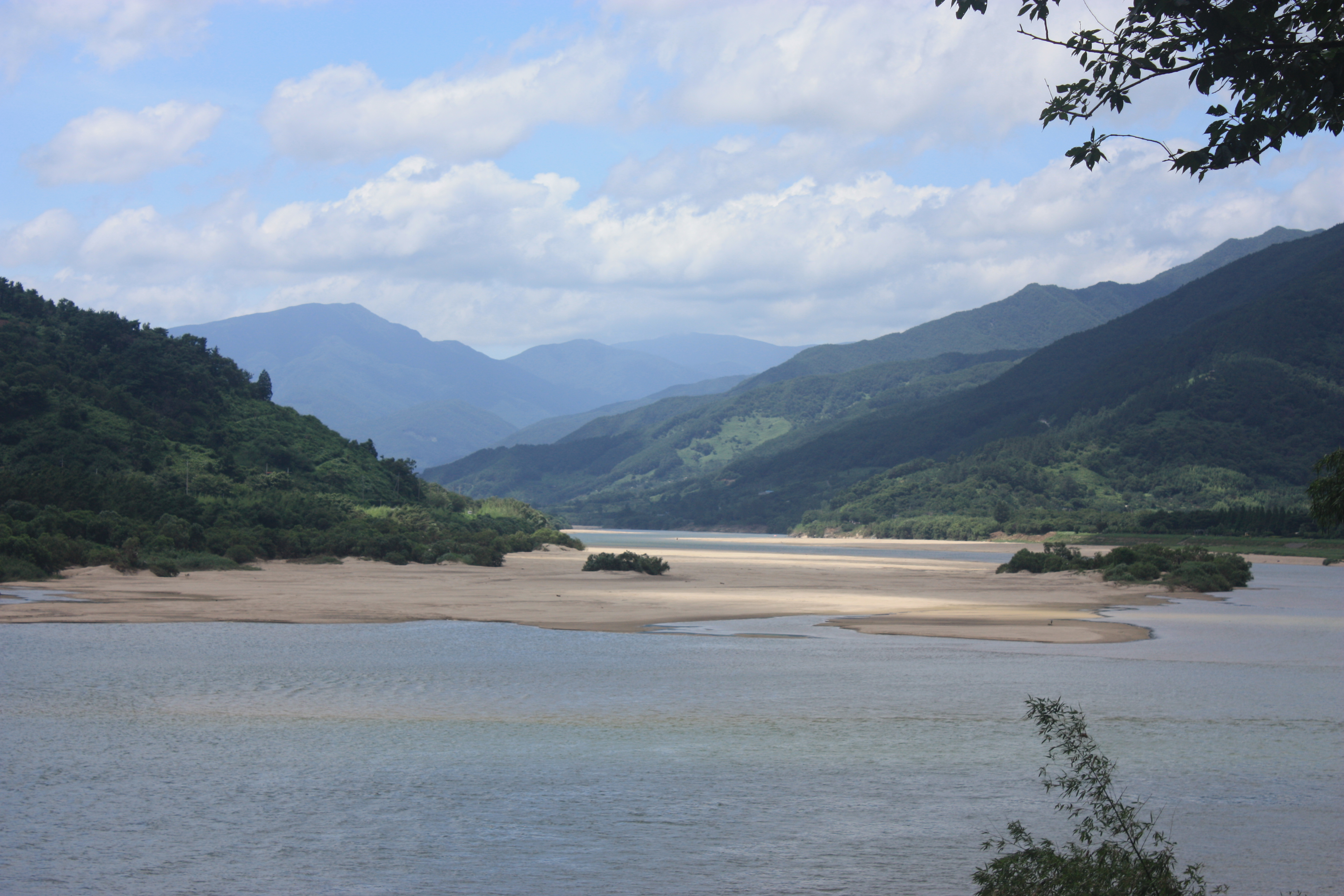
- The river near Hadong

Location
- Country: South Korea

Physical characteristics
- Source
  - location: Mt. Palgongsan
  - coordinates: 35°38′34″N 127°26′40″E
- Mouth
  - location: Gwangyang Bay
  - coordinates: 34°56′26″N 127°46′33″E
- Length: 212.3 km (131.9 mi)
- Basin size: 4,896.5 km^{2} (1,890.5 sq mi)

- Seomjin River
- Hangul: 섬진강
- Hanja: 蟾津江
- RR: Seomjingang
- MR: Sŏmjin'gang

The Seomjin River (Korean: 섬진강) is a river in South Korea. It flows through southeastern North Jeolla Province, eastern South Jeolla Province, and western South Gyeongsang Province province. It flows into the Korea Strait. The Seomjin River originates from Palgongsan and flows for 212.3 kilometers before reaching its final destination in Gwangyang, where it enters Gwangyang Bay.

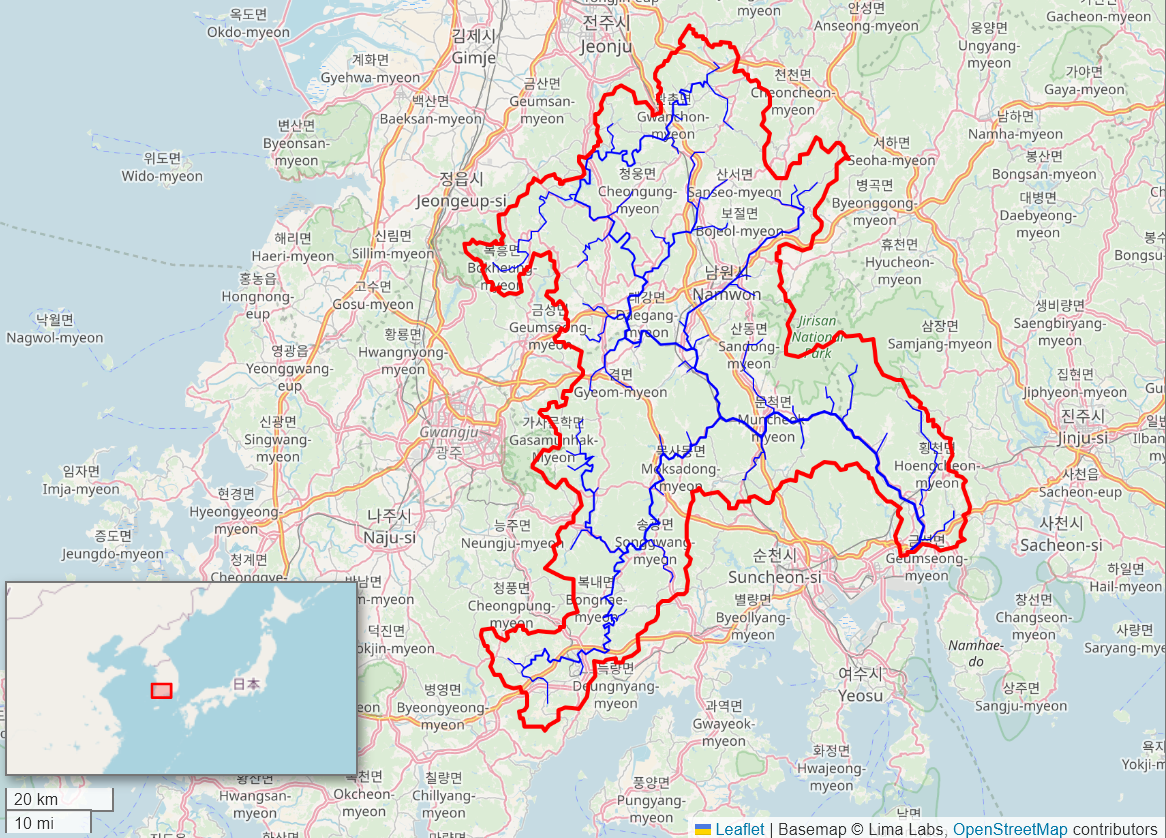
Map of the Seomjin River watershed

The Seomjingang watershed comprises some 4,896.5 km². This area includes both farmland and a great deal of pristine mountain country, including the Jirisan area. A wide variety of animals are found along the river, including the European otter, Lutra lutra. Principal tributaries include the Boseong River and Yocheon stream.

The name "Seomjin" literally means "toad ferry." This name is believed to date from Hideyoshi's invasions of Korea in the 1590s. According to legend, a swarm of toads blocked the Japanese army from crossing the Seomjin into northern Jeolla.

In August 2020, consecutive days of heavier-than-usual rainfall caused the river to overflow and a levee on river collapsed, resulting in massive flooding. Thousands of residents who lived in villages and towns along the river were left homeless as entire communities were submerged by the floodwaters.

== See also ==
- Rivers of Korea
- Geography of South Korea
