= Heukseongsan =

Mountain in Cheonan, South Korea

Highest point
- Elevation: 519 m (1,703 ft)
- Coordinates: 36°47′49″N 127°12′29″E

Geography
- Location: Cheonan, South Korea

Korean name
- Hangul: 흑성산
- Hanja: 黑城山
- RR: Heukseongsan
- MR: Hŭksŏngsan

Heukseongsan (Korean: 흑성산) is a mountain located in Cheonan, South Korea. It has an elevation of 519 m (1,703 ft).

== See also ==
- Geography of South Korea
- List of mountains in Korea
- List of mountains by elevation
