= Jinyang Lake =

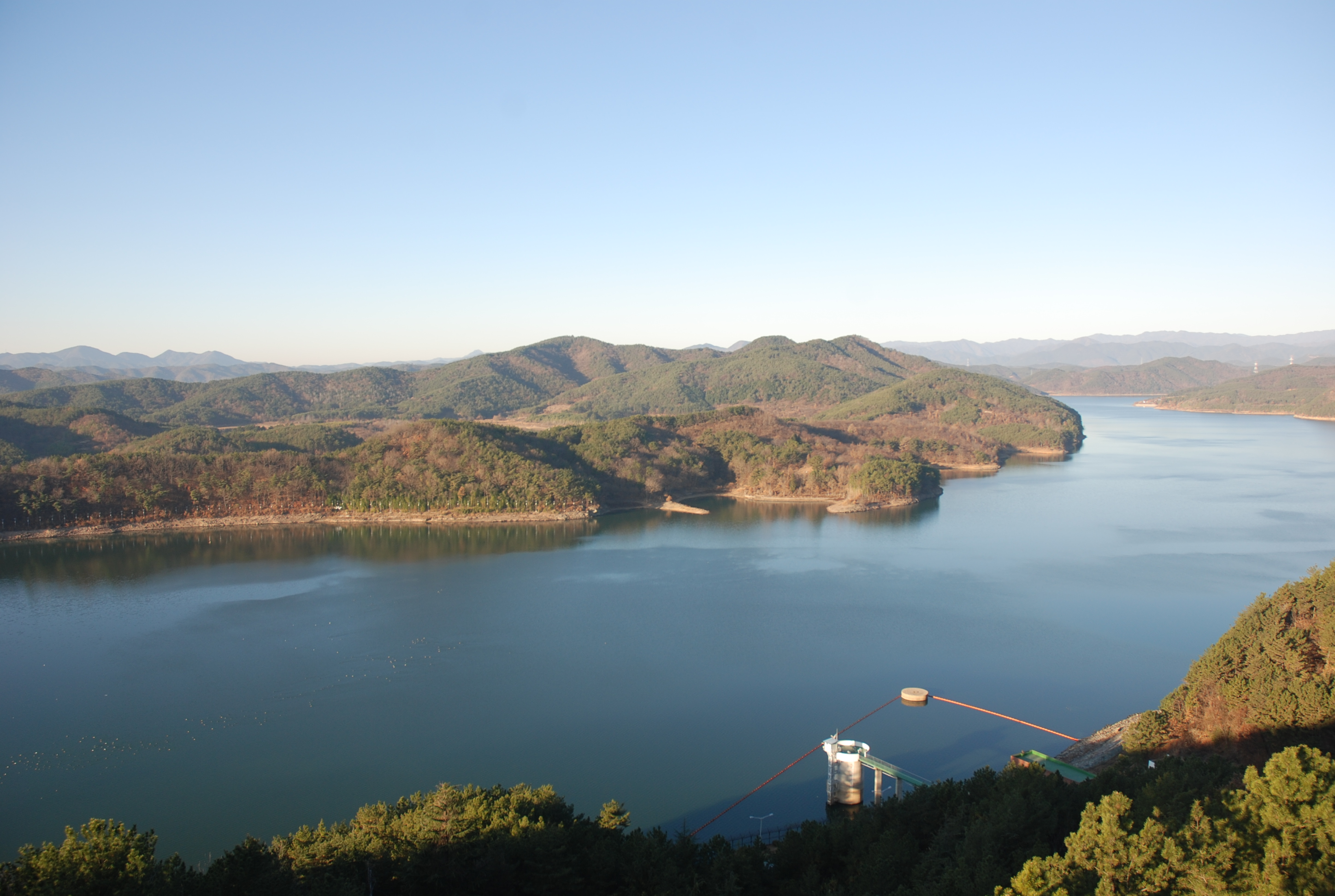
- Interactive map of Jinyang Lake
- Location: South Gyeongsang Province
- Coordinates: 35°10′19″N 128°01′53″E
- Type: reservoir
- Basin countries: South Korea
- Surface area: 29.4 km^{2} (11.4 sq mi)

Korean name
- Hangul: 진양호
- Hanja: 晉陽湖
- RR: Jinyangho
- MR: Chinyangho

Jinyang Lake (Korean: 진양호) is a reservoir covering portions of Jinju and Sacheon, South Gyeongsang Province, South Korea. The water surface covers 29.4 km². It was formed in 1970, by the construction of a dam where the Gyeongho and Deokcheon rivers join to form the Nam River.

Most of the Jinju side of the lake is a city park, which was established in 1998. The area has become a popular local attraction, with hotels, restaurants, a small zoo, and the Jinju Land amusement park.

Jinyang Lake, like several other regions in the Nakdong River basin, is home to a population of endangered Eurasian otters.
