= Geum River =

Third longest river in South Korea

Coordinates: 36°00′N 126°40′E

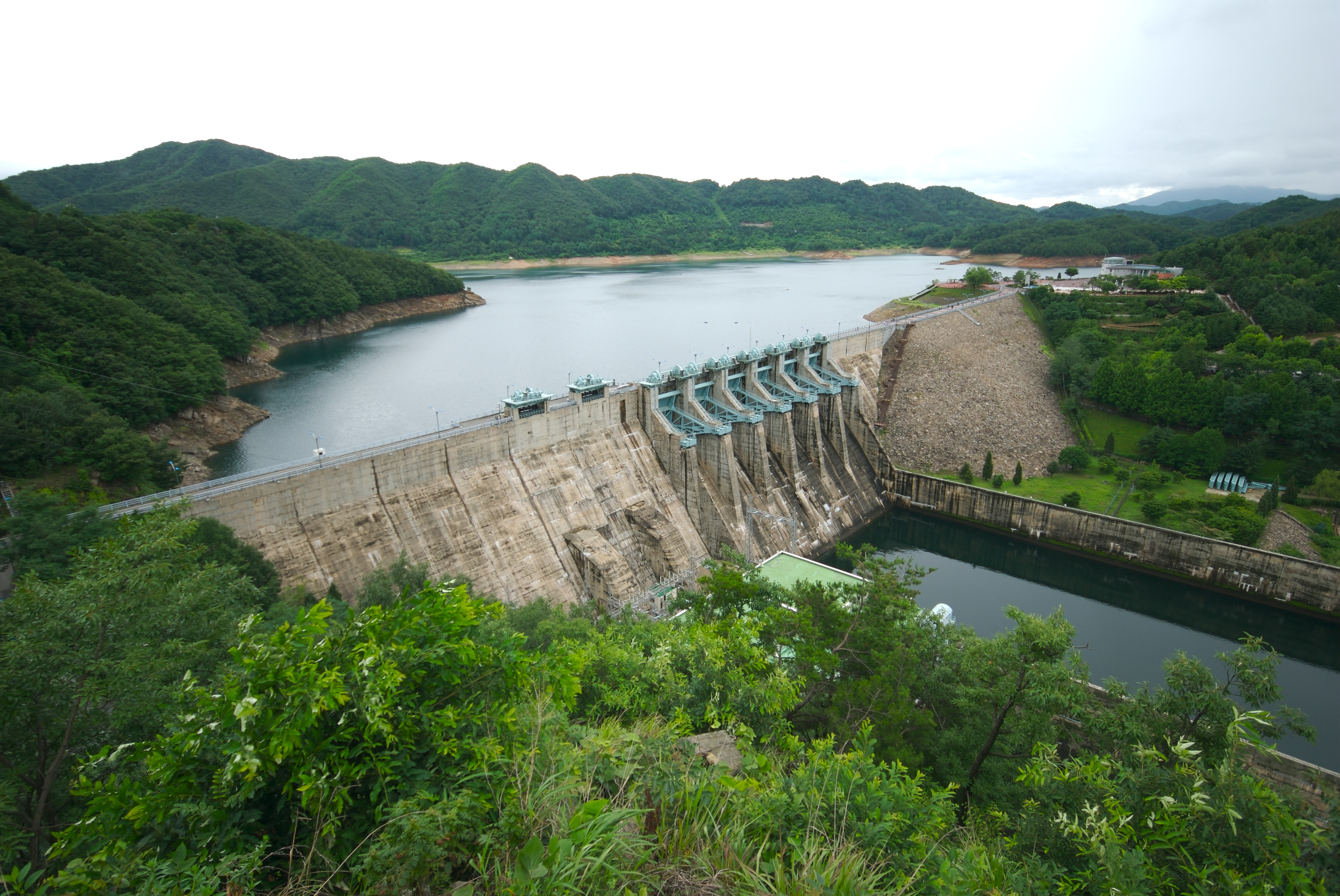
- The Geum River (Keum river)

- The Geum River is the thick blue line.

Location
- Country: South Korea
- Provinces: North Jeolla Province, North Chungcheong Province, Daejeon, Sejong, South Chungcheong Province

Physical characteristics
- Source: Sobaek Mountains
  - location: Sinmusan Mountain, Jangsu, North Jeolla Province (Note: Sinmusan Mountain (896.8 m, Korean: 신무산; Hanja: 神舞山))
- Mouth: Yellow Sea
  - location: Esturay bank, Seocheon, South Chungcheong Province
- Length: 397 km (247 mi)
- Basin size: 9,912 km^{2} (3,827 sq mi)
- Discharge
  - location: Gongju Bridge, Gongju (Note: Discharge average from 2004 to 2013.)
  - average: 132 m^{3}/s (4,700 cu ft/s) (Note: Discharge average from 2004 to 2013.)

Basin features
- Tributaries
  - left: Gapcheon, Ganggyeongcheon
  - right: Miho River

Korean name
- Hangul: 금강
- Hanja: 錦江
- RR: Geumgang
- MR: Kŭmgang

The Geum River (Note: In the 19th century, the Geumgang was also known as the Keum Kang or Keum River.) (Korean: 금강) is a major river of South Korea that originates in Jangsu-eup, North Jeolla Province. It flows northward through North Jeolla and North Chungcheong Provinces and then changes direction in the vicinity of Greater Daejeon and flows southwest through South Chungcheong Province before emptying into the Yellow Sea near Gunsan.

The river is 397 kilometres (247 mi) long, making it the third longest in South Korea. The area of the Geum River Basin is 9,859 square kilometres (3,807 mi^{2}). The upper part of the river flows slowly through part of the Noryeongsanmaek Mountains and is marked by extensive stream meandering. On the other hand, river curves on middle and lower parts of the river are more gradual and there is comparatively less stream meandering.

Tributary streams of the Geumgang include the Gap-cheon, Yugu-cheon, Miho-cheon, Unsan-cheon, Seokseong-cheon, and Nonsan-cheon. Several small alluvial plains including the Honam and Nonsan Plain have been formed by the flow of the Geumgang and its tributaries.

== History and culture ==
In the area of Buyeo County, the river bears the name Baengmagang river, which means White Horse River. Numerous legends associate the ancient kingdom of Baekje with the Baengma. The Baengma River is the subject of a well-known song of the sin minyo tradition, Kkumkkuneun Baengmagang (꿈꾸는 백마강, "Dreaming Baengmagang").

The Geumgang River and its tributaries were a means of cultural contact from prehistoric times (see Mumun Pottery Period) and into the Three Kingdoms of Korea through their ancient function as a transportation route that begins on the west coast and penetrates deep in the interior of the Peninsula. Bronze Culture flourished in this area from c. 850 B.C.-A.D. 100 (see Liaoning bronze dagger culture). Archaeological evidence suggests that some of the first complex societies in southern Korea briefly flourished in the valleys formed by tributaries of this river.

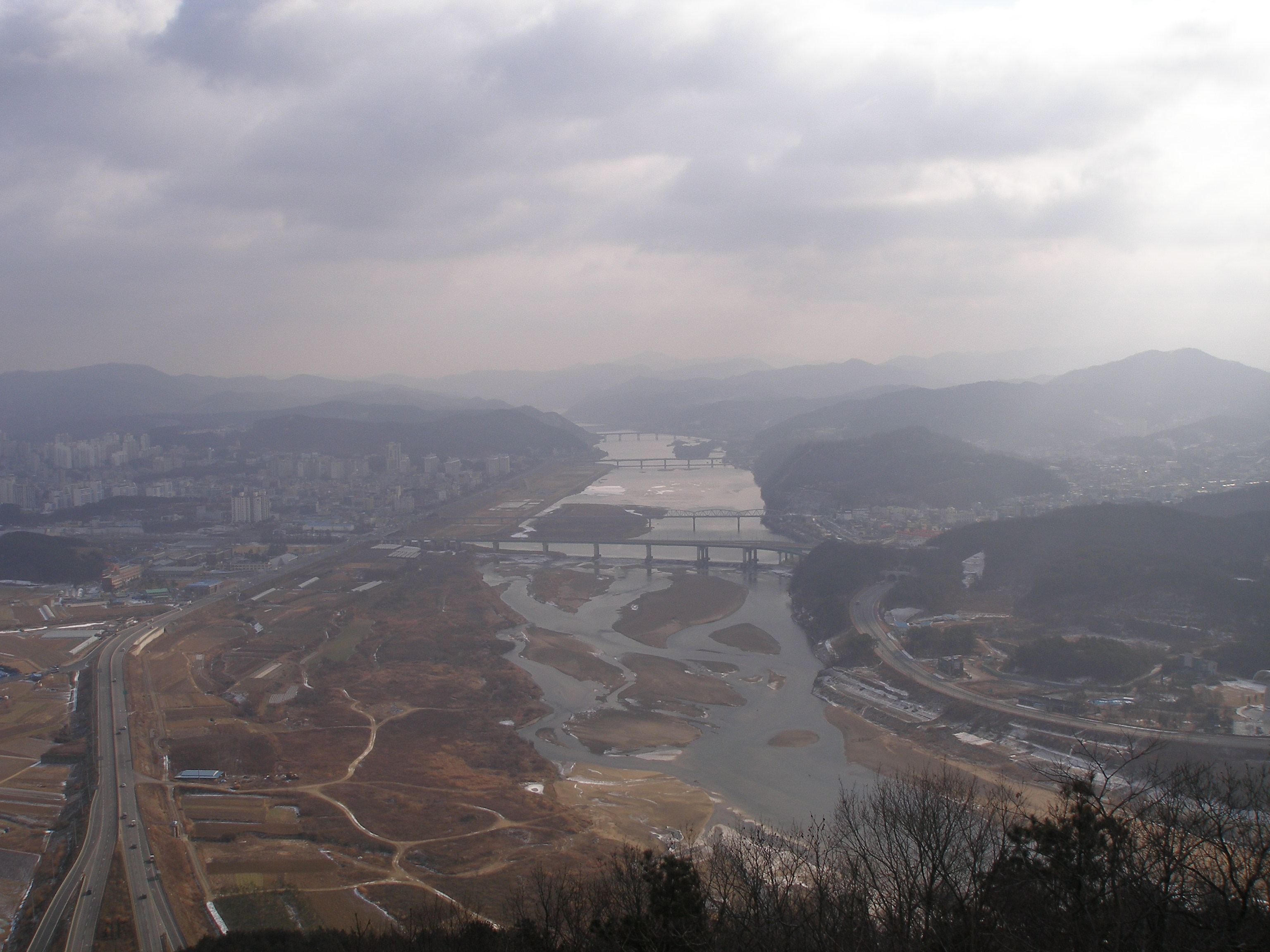
Geum River run through Gongju

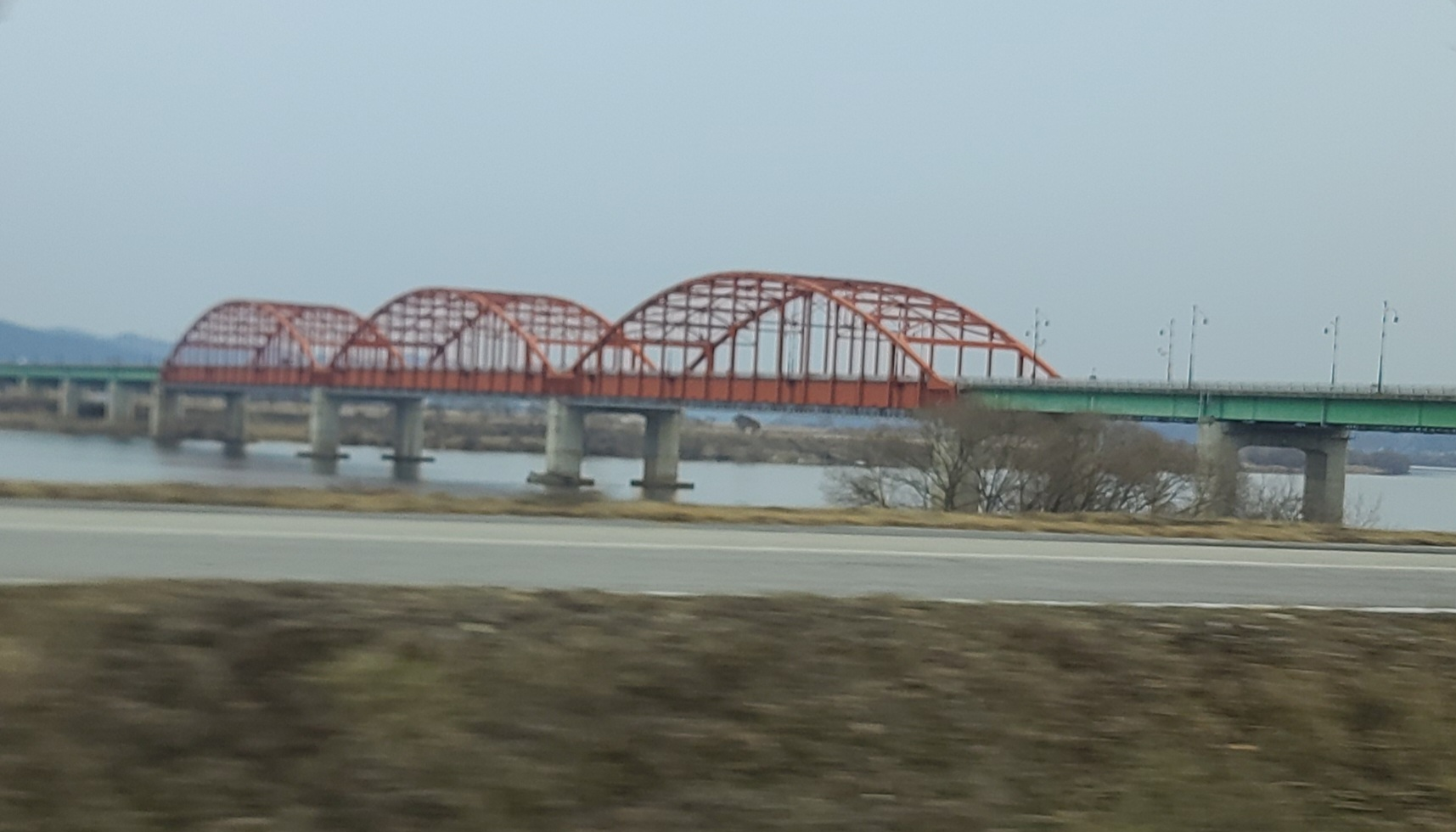
Buyeo Bridge on Geum River, located in Buyeo County, connecting Buyeo County to the east and west

The Geumgang River Basin contained the chiefdoms of Mahan, and a former centres of the early kingdom of Baekje such as Ungjin (AD 475–525) and Sabi (AD 525–660) are located along the Baengma portion of the river.

The river's Korean name ("Silk River") is a homonym of the word for "diamond" (금강; 金剛) and should not be confused with Kŭmgang Mountain (금강산; 金剛山; "Diamond Mountain") in North Korea.

== Economy ==
Dams have been built on the Middle and Upper Geumgang to facilitate water for agriculture and industry. They include the Daecheong Dam and the Yongdam Dam. The city of Greater Daejeon and the farms and industries of South Chungcheong Province rely heavily on the Geum River and its tributaries.

The alluvial plains formed by the Geumgang and its tributaries are the locations of significant agricultural production in Korea.

== See also ==
- Rivers of Asia
- Rivers of Korea
- Geography of South Korea
