= Yeongsan River =

River in South Korea

Coordinates: 34°46′N 126°21′E

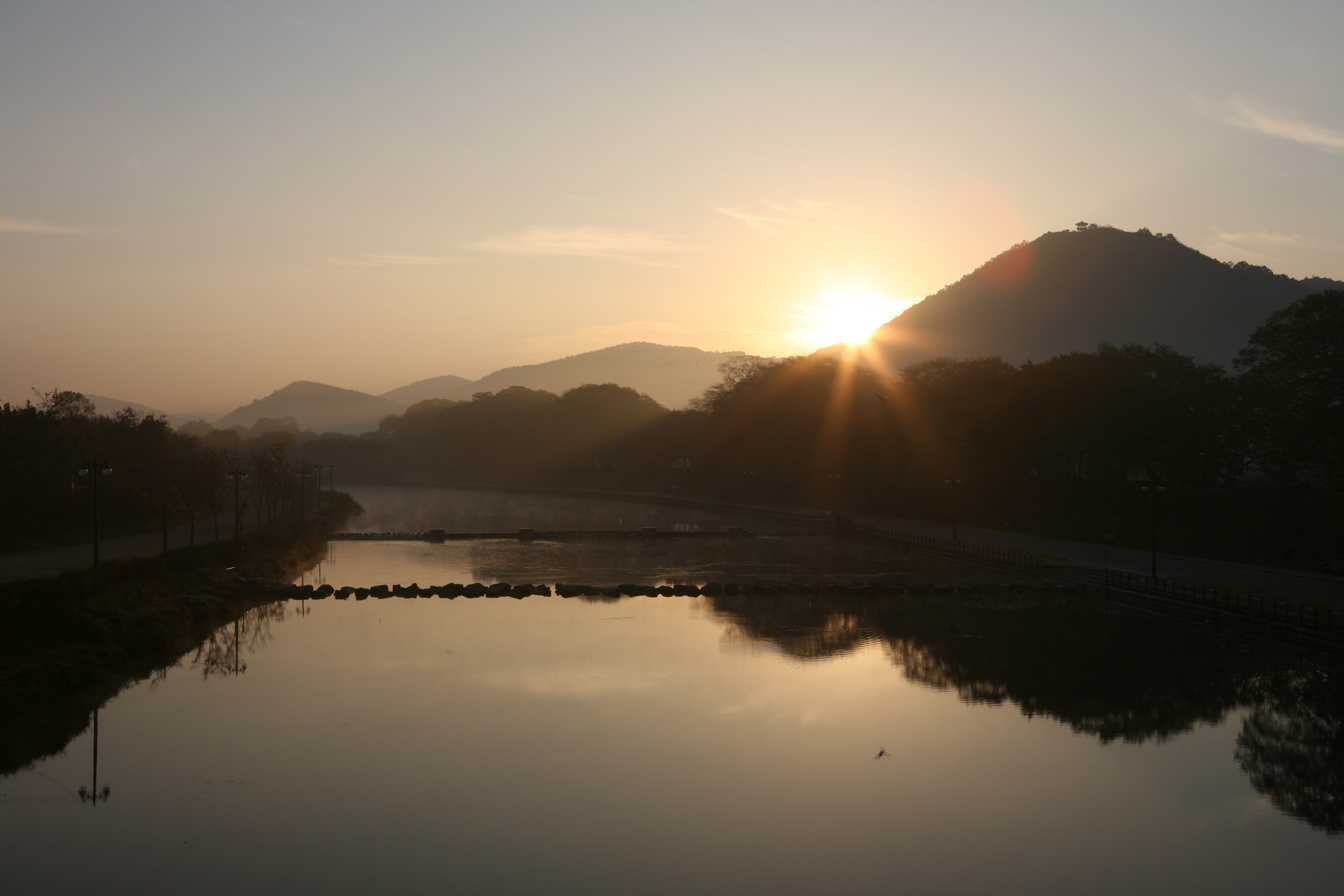
- Yeongsan River flowing through Damyang

Location
- Country: South Korea
- Provinces: South Jeolla Province, Gwangju

Physical characteristics
- Source: Bukhacheon
  - location: Byeongpung Mountain, Damyang, South Jeolla (Note: Byeongpung Mountain (822.2m, Korean: 병풍산; Hanja: 屛風山; RR: Byeongpungsan))
- Mouth: Yellow Sea
  - location: Esturay Bank, Yeongam, South Jeolla Province
- Length: 129 km (80 mi)
- Basin size: 3,467 km^{2} (1,339 sq mi)
- Discharge
  - location: Naju Bridge, Naju (Note: Discharge average from 2004 to 2013.)
  - average: 48 m^{3}/s (1,700 cu ft/s) (Note: Discharge average from 2004 to 2013.)

Basin features
- Tributaries
  - left: Jiseokcheon
  - right: Hwangnyong River, Gomagwoncheon, Hampyeongcheon

Korean name
- Hangul: 영산강
- Hanja: 榮山江
- RR: Yeongsangang
- MR: Yŏngsan'gang

The Yeongsan River (Korean: 영산강) is a river in south-western South Korea. It has a length of 129.50 km, and covers an area of 3,467.83 km^{2}. It runs through Damyang, Naju, Gwangju and other regions and eventually flows into the Yellow Sea at Yeongam through the estuary bank.

== See also ==
- Rivers of Korea
- Geography of South Korea
