= Hwang River =

River in South Korea

Hwang River 황강
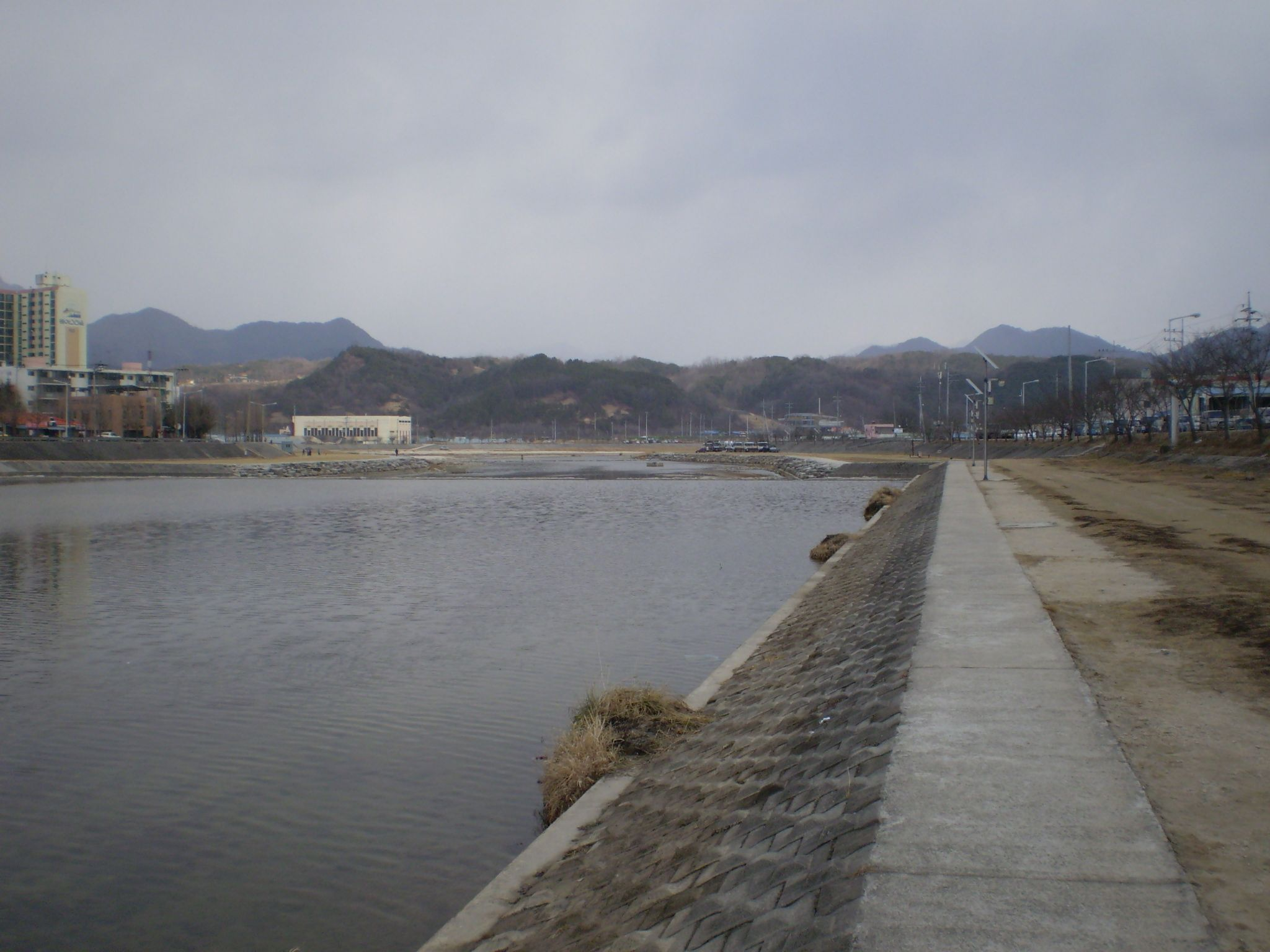
- The Hwang River near Geochang

Location
- Country: South Korea

Physical characteristics
- Source
  - location: Geochang County
  - coordinates: 38.818°N 127.863°E
  - elevation: 189.75 m (622.5 ft)
- Mouth
  - location: Nakdong River
  - coordinates: 35.574°N 128.359°E
  - elevation: 18.07 m (59.3 ft)
- Length: 114 km (71 mi)
- Basin size: 1,328 square kilometres (513 mi^{2})

- Hwang River
- Hangul: 황강
- Hanja: 黃江
- RR: Hwanggang
- MR: Hwanggang

The Hwang River (Korean: 황강) is a tributary of the Nakdong River, flowing through South Gyeongsang Province in southeastern South Korea. It is about 114 kilometres (71 mi) in length, and drains a basin of 1,328 square kilometres (513 mi^{2}).

The Hwang River originates on the slopes of Sambongsan in Goje-myeon in Geochang. It then joins with various streams, including the Wicheoncheon which flows from the slopes of Deogyusan, and meets the Nakdong at Geochang-eup in Hapcheon County.

Although the name Hwang literally means "yellow", it may be derived from an earlier Korean name "Han" (한) meaning "large". Alternatively, the name may have come from a nearby mountain that was known as Hwangsan ("yellow mountain") during the Joseon period.

The Hwang is home to a population of European otters, which are endangered in South Korea.

== See also ==
- List of rivers of Korea
- Hwang Ho
