= Sincheon (Gyeonggi) =

Stream in Gyeonggi-do, South Korea

- Hangul: 신천
- Hanja: 新川
- RR: Sincheon
- MR: Sinch'ŏn

Sincheon (Korean: 신천) is a stream in Gyeonggi Province, South Korea. It is a tributary of Samicheon, which in turn flows into the Imjin River.

== See also ==
- Rivers of Korea
- Geography of South Korea
