= Sincheon (Daegu) =

Stream in Daegu, South Korea

- Hangul: 신천
- Hanja: 新川
- RR: Sincheon
- MR: Sinch'ŏn

Sincheon (Korean: 신천) is a stream flowing through eastern Daegu, South Korea. It rises from the Naengcheon and other streams in Gachang-myeon, Dalseong County, in the rural south of the city, and flows north through the east side of the city center to reach the Geumho River. For much of its length it is bordered by a riverwalk on either side. In addition, the west bank is the site of the Sincheon Expressway.

Along its course, the Sincheon passes through every district of Daegu except one: beginning in Dalseong-gun, it passes between Suseong District and Nam District and Jung District, and then flowing through a brief section of Dong District it enters Buk District, where it reaches its end.

== Etymology ==
The name "Sincheon" means "new stream." This name refers to its being constructed as part of a flood containment project ordered by local official Yi Seo during the reign of King Jeongjo in 1778. Since that time, the stream has been continuously subject to human interventions, for flood control, recreation, and other purposes. But there are other theories about the derivation of the name "Sincheon". Chances are that the name was written incorrectly as 'Shincheon ' in the process of the Korean name 'Saecheon' being written in Chinese characters.

== Ecology ==
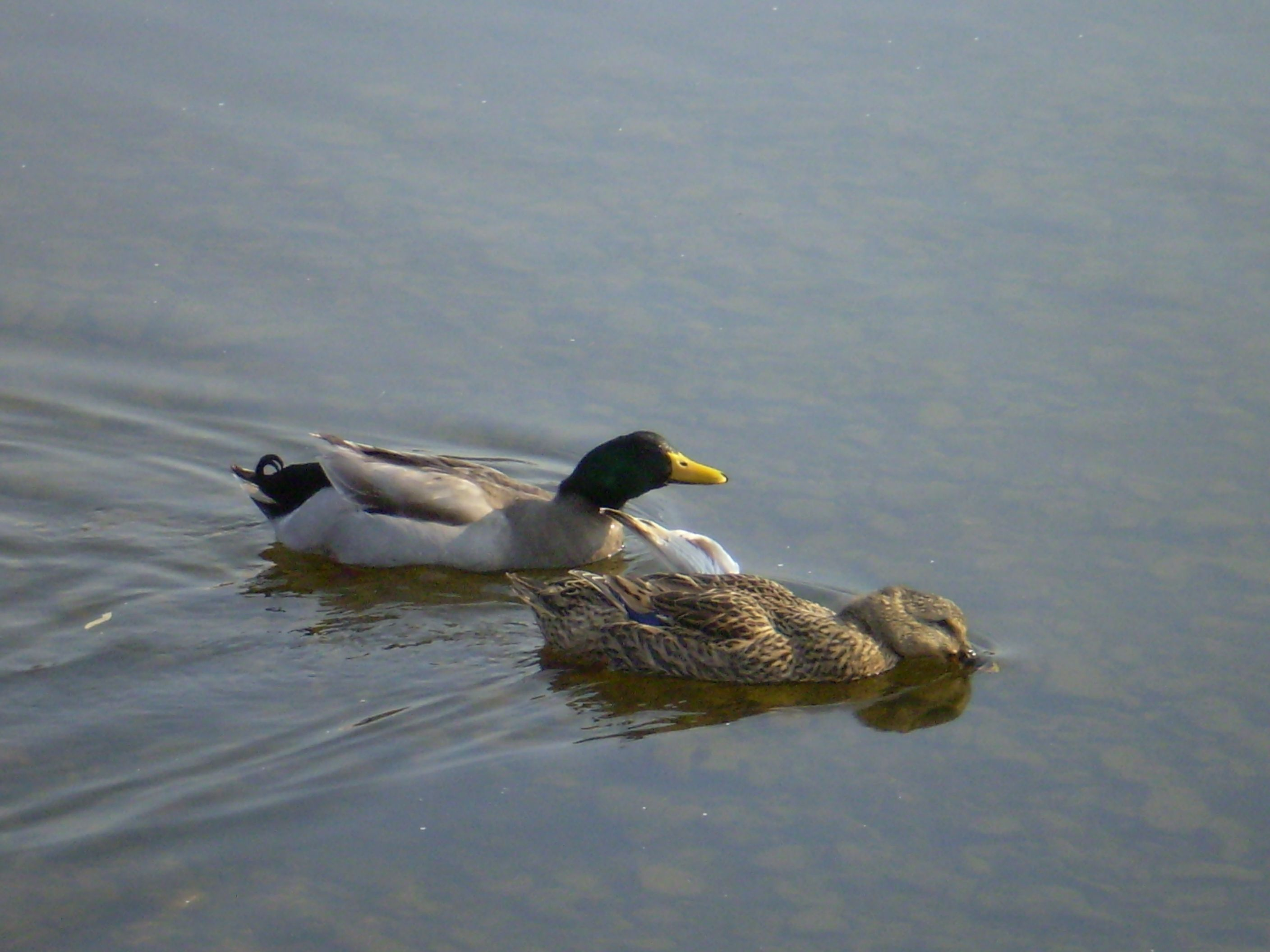
Sincheon mallards

The Sincheon is habitat to a large population of birds, including mallards as well as gray herons and little egrets. In addition, it is the habitat for the Eurasian river otter, Lutra lutra. The herons, egrets and otters all feed on the abundant population of fish.

== Course ==
From 1994 to 1997, pumps were installed at the Sincheon Wastewater Treatment Plant next to Mutaegyo Bridge to supply 50,000 tons of water per day, including water drawn from the Geumho River, to Sangdonggyo Bridge upstream through a 9.1 km water pipeline. Seoul's Cheonggyecheon also benchmarked this method and restored the stream by drawing water from the Han River at the downstream pumping station and sending clean water upstream through the water pipeline.

== Crossings ==
The bridges cross the Sincheon in Daegu. They are:

- Yonggyegyo Bridge
- Gachanggyo Bridge
- Padonggyo Bridge
- Yongdugyo Bridge
- Dusangyo Bridge
- Sangdonggyo Bridge
- Jungdonggyo Bridge
- Huimanggyo Bridge
- Daebonggyo Bridge
- Suseonggyo Bridge
- Dongsingyo Bridge
- Sincheongyo Bridge
- Sincheoncheoldogyo Bridge
- Sinseonggyo Bridge
- Chilseonggyo Bridge
- Chilseong Submersible Bridge
- Kyeongdaegyo Bridge
- Docheonggyo Bridge
- Seongbukgyo Bridge
- Chimsangyo Bridge

== See also ==
- Rivers of Korea
- Environment of South Korea
