= Gyeongho River =

River in South Korea

- Hangul: 경호강
- Hanja: 鏡湖江
- RR: Gyeonghogang
- MR: Kyŏnghogang

The Gyeongho River (Korean: 경호강) is a river in western South Gyeongsang Province in southern South Korea. It rises on the eastern slopes of Jirisan and flows around the edge of Jirisan National Park, joining the Deokcheon River at Jinyang Lake. Thereafter it drains into the Nam River, and then into the Nakdong River, which carries its waters into the Sea of Japan (East Sea).

The Gyeongho River is thus named because it is said its 'water is as clear as a mirror'. The river's clarity and spectacular scenery of the areas through which it passes prompted poets, writers and artists to record the river's beauty in verse and on canvas.

The Gyeongho River also draws adventure-seekers. It is wide, with few boulders, making it a wonderful river for rafting. It has even been touted as the only river with rafting opportunity south of the Han River.

Numerous rare species can be found in and near the Gyeongho River, including the endangered European otter.

== See also ==
- List of rivers
