= Wangpicheon =

River in South Korea

Wangpicheon River
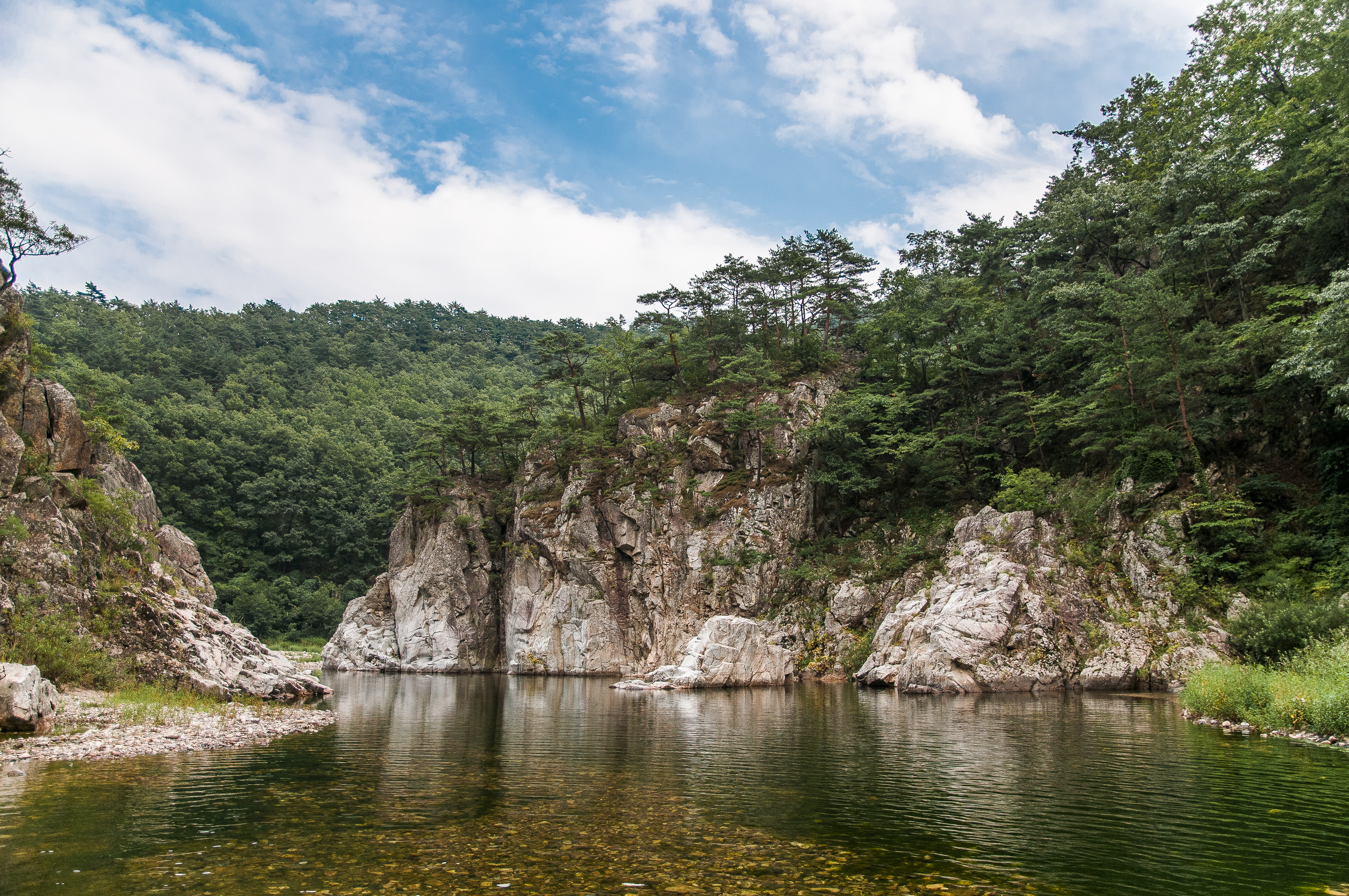
- Wangpicheon river

- Location of mouth

Location
- Country: South Korea
- Province: North Gyeongsang Province

Physical characteristics
- Mouth
  - location: Sea of Japan
  - coordinates: 36°58′15″N 129°24′45″E
- Length: 61 mi (98 km)
- Basin size: 513.71 km^{2} (198.34 sq mi)

Wangpicheon (Korean: 왕피천) is a river in eastern South Korea. It flows from Yeongyang County, North Gyeongsang Province to the Sea of Japan, passing through Uljin County and covering a distance of about 61 kilometres (38 mi). The river basins are currently designated as ecological and landscape preservation areas. The Wangpicheon watershed covers an area of roughly 513.71 square kilometres (198.34 mi^{2}). It has excellent vegetation and natural scenery, and endangered species such as otter, goat, hawk, and rare plants live in the area, as well as a community of many species of fish.

== See also ==
- List of rivers of Korea
