= Miho River =

Watercourse in South Korea

Coordinates: 36°31′N 127°19′E

Miho River (Korean: 미호강; Hanja: 美湖江), a tributary of Geum River, is a river beginning in Eumseong in North Chungcheong Province. Its length is about 37.5 km.

== See also ==
- List of rivers of Korea
