= Sincheon-dong =

Sincheon-dong may refer to

- Sincheon-dong, Seoul
- Sincheon-dong, Daegu
- Sincheon-dong, Siheung

== See also ==
- Sinchon-dong (disambiguation)
