= Sinchon-dong =

Sinchon-dong may refer to:

- Sinchon-dong, Seoul, a neighbourhood and a judicial dong in Seodaemun-gu in Seoul, South Korea
- Sinchon-dong, Gwangju, a neighborhood of the Gwangsan District, Gwangju, South Korea
- Sinchon-dong, Anyang, a neighborhood of the Dongan district in the city of Anyang, Gyeonggi Province, South Korea
- Sinchon-dong, Daejeon, a neighborhood of the Dong-gu, Daejeon, South Korea
- Sinchon-dong, Seongnam, a neighborhood of the Sujeong district in the city of Seongnam, Gyeonggi Province, South Korea
- Sinchon-dong, Cheongju, a neighborhood of the Heungdeok district in the city of Cheongju, North Chungcheong Province, South Korea
- Sinchon-dong, Namwon, a neighborhood of the city of Namwon, North Jeolla Province, South Korea
- Sinchon-dong, Changwon, a neighborhood of the Seongsan district in the city of Changwon, South Gyeongsang Province, South Korea
