= Yanghwacheon =

Watercourse in South Korea

Yanghwacheon (Korean: 양화천) is a river of South Korea. It is a river of the Han River system.
