= Nam River (South Korea) =

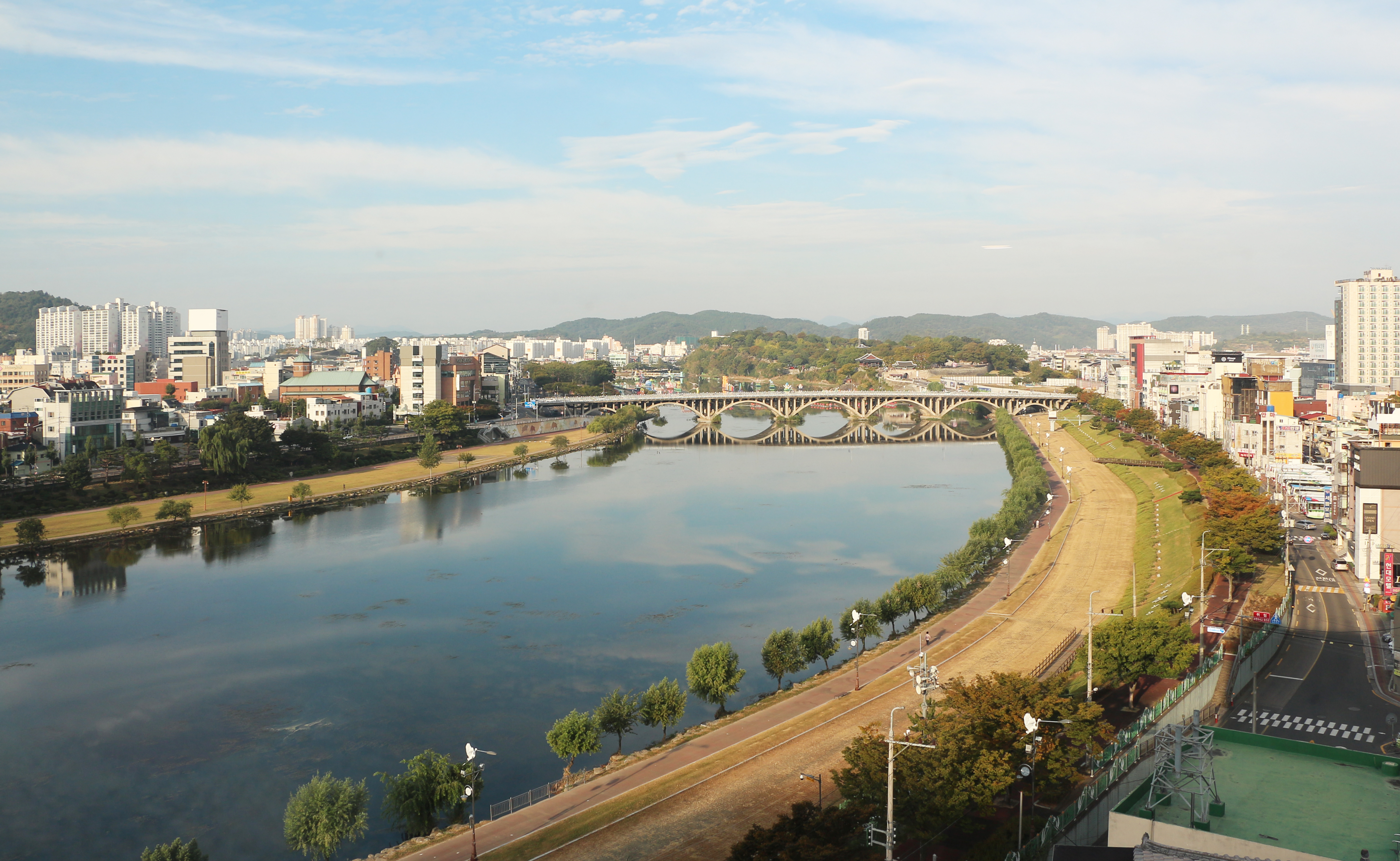
- Nam River in Jinju
- Native name: 남강 (Korean)

Location
- Countries: South Korea
- Province: South Gyeongsang Province

Physical characteristics
- Length: 193.7 km (120.4 mi)
- Basin size: 3,644.3 km^{2} (1,407.1 sq mi)

The Nam River or Namgang (Korean: 남강) is a river in South Gyeongsang Province, South Korea. It is a tributary of the Nakdong River.

In 1950, during the Korean War, the river was the site of fierce battles between United Nations troops and North Korean forces, the Battle of the Nam River.

== See also ==
- Rivers of Asia
- Rivers of Korea
- Geography of South Korea
