= Ttangkkeut =

Area of Haenam County, South Korea

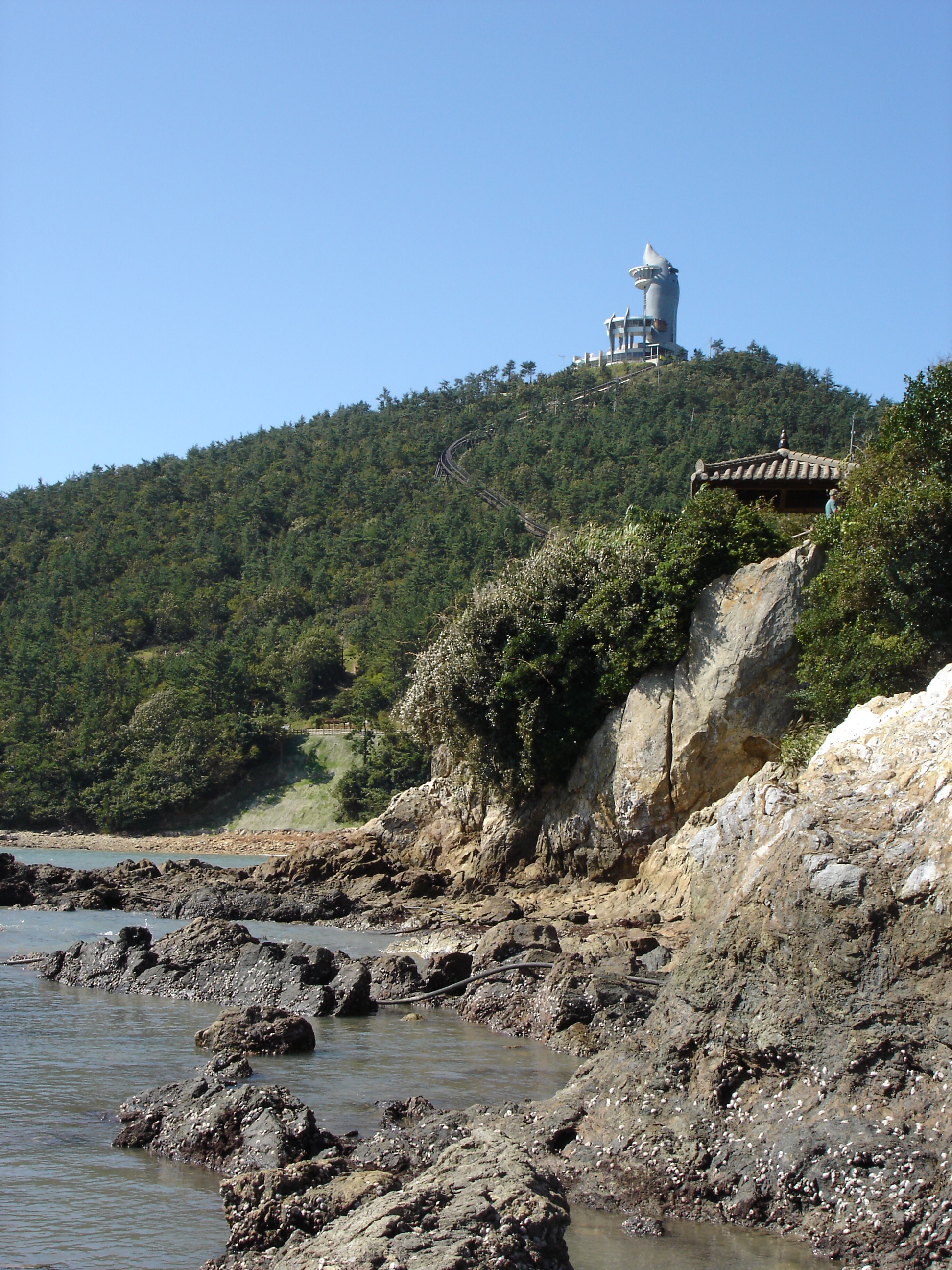

Korean name
- Hangul: 땅끝; 토말
- Hanja: (none); 土末
- RR: Ttangkkeut; Tomal
- MR: Ttangkkŭt; T'omal

Ttangkkeut or Ddangkkeut, located at Songho-ri (송호리 松湖里), Songji-myeon (송지면 松旨面), Haenam County, South Jeolla Province, South Korea, is the southernmost area of the Korean Peninsula. It is also called Tomal, all of which mean "the edge of the land" in Korean.

Ttangkkeut Village (Ttangkkeut maeul, 땅끝마을) lies in the area where Galdusan, a small mountain, stands.

Wando Islands, also a favorite tourist zone, are located less than an hour's drive from Ttangkkeut village.

== Local attractions ==
- Mihwangsa
- Daeheungsa
