= Palgongsan (North Jeolla) =

Mountain in South Korea

Highest point
- Elevation: 1,151 m (3,776 ft)
- Coordinates: 35°37′14″N 127°27′56″E

Geography
- Location: North Jeolla Province, South Korea

Palgongsan is a mountain of North Jeolla Province, western South Korea. It has an elevation of 1,151 metres.

== See also ==
- List of mountains of Korea
