= Chaeryong River =

River in North Korea

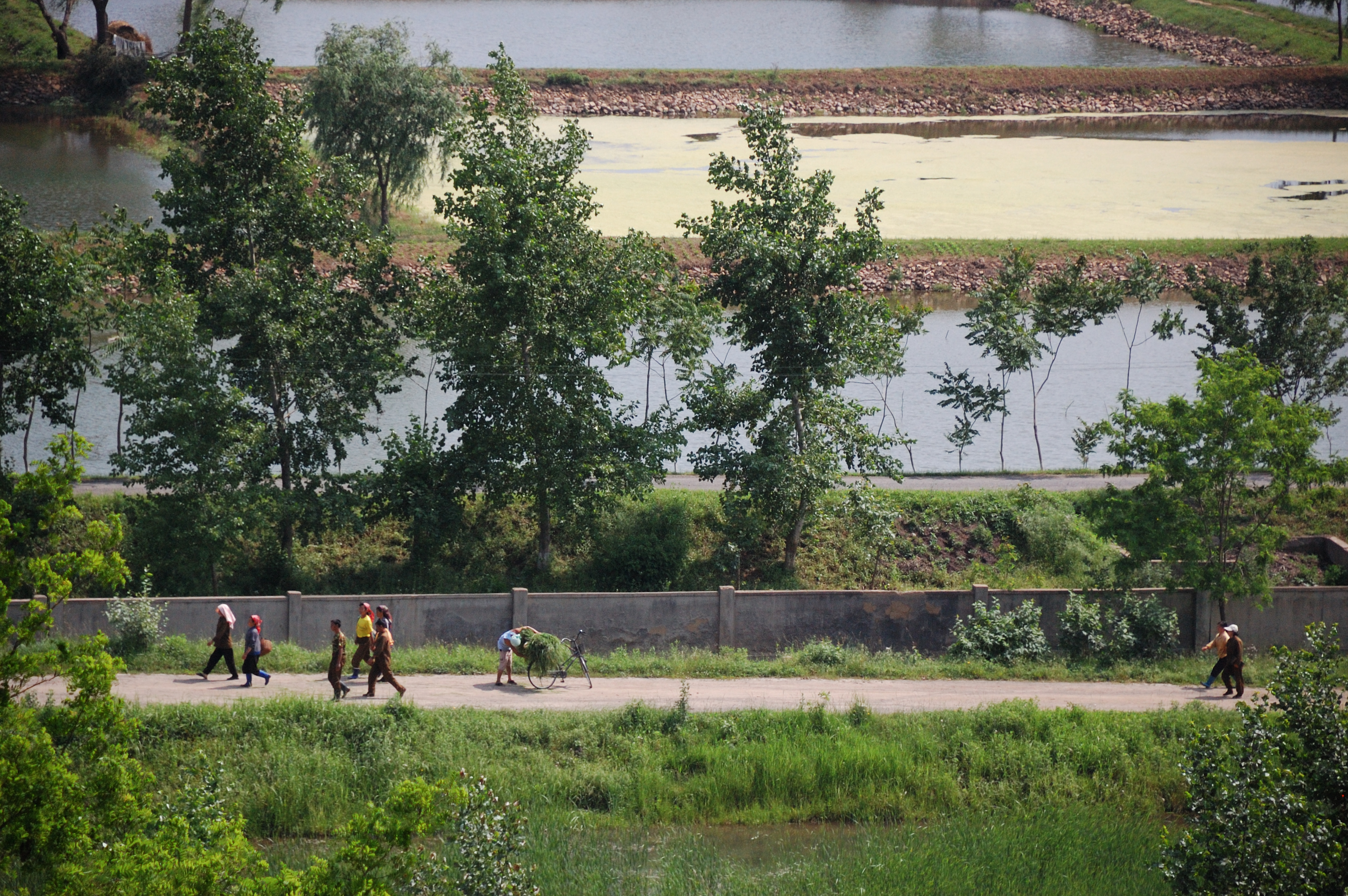

Location
- Country: (North Korea) Democratic People's Republic of Korea

Physical characteristics
- Source
  - location: Yellow Sea, South Hwanghae Province
- Mouth
  - location: Taedong River
  - coordinates: 38°38′45″N 125°37′17″E
- Length: 120 km (75 mi)
- Basin size: 3,600 km^{2} (1,400 sq mi)

Chaeryong River (Korean: 재령강) is the main tributary of the Taedong River. It is navigable for 38 km from its mouth by 300-ton ships, and provides sea access to Sariwon.

The river originates from Namsan Mountain in Duryeon-myeon, Hwanghae-do, and Iyul-myeon, Byeokseong-gun, and flows through the Jaeryeong Plain.
