= Geography of South Korea =

Coordinates: 36°N 128°E

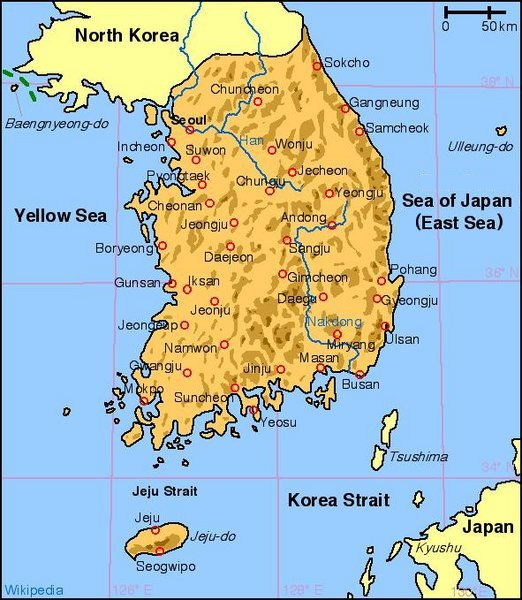
Map of South Korea

South Korea is located in East Asia, on the southern portion of the Korean Peninsula located out from the far east of the Asian landmass. The only country that shares a land border with South Korea is North Korea, lying to the north with 238 kilometres (148 mi) of the border running along the Korean Demilitarized Zone. South Korea is mostly surrounded by water and has 2,413 kilometres (1,499 mi) of coastline along three seas: to the west is the Yellow Sea (called Sohae Korean: 서해; Hanja: 西海; in South Korea, literally means "west sea"), to the south is the East China Sea, and to the east is the Sea of Japan (called Donghae Korean: 동해; Hanja: 東海; in South Korea, literally means "east sea"). Geographically, South Korea's landmass is approximately 100,472.4 square kilometres (38,792.6 mi^{2}). The approximate coordinates are 37° North, 128° East.

== Land area and borders ==
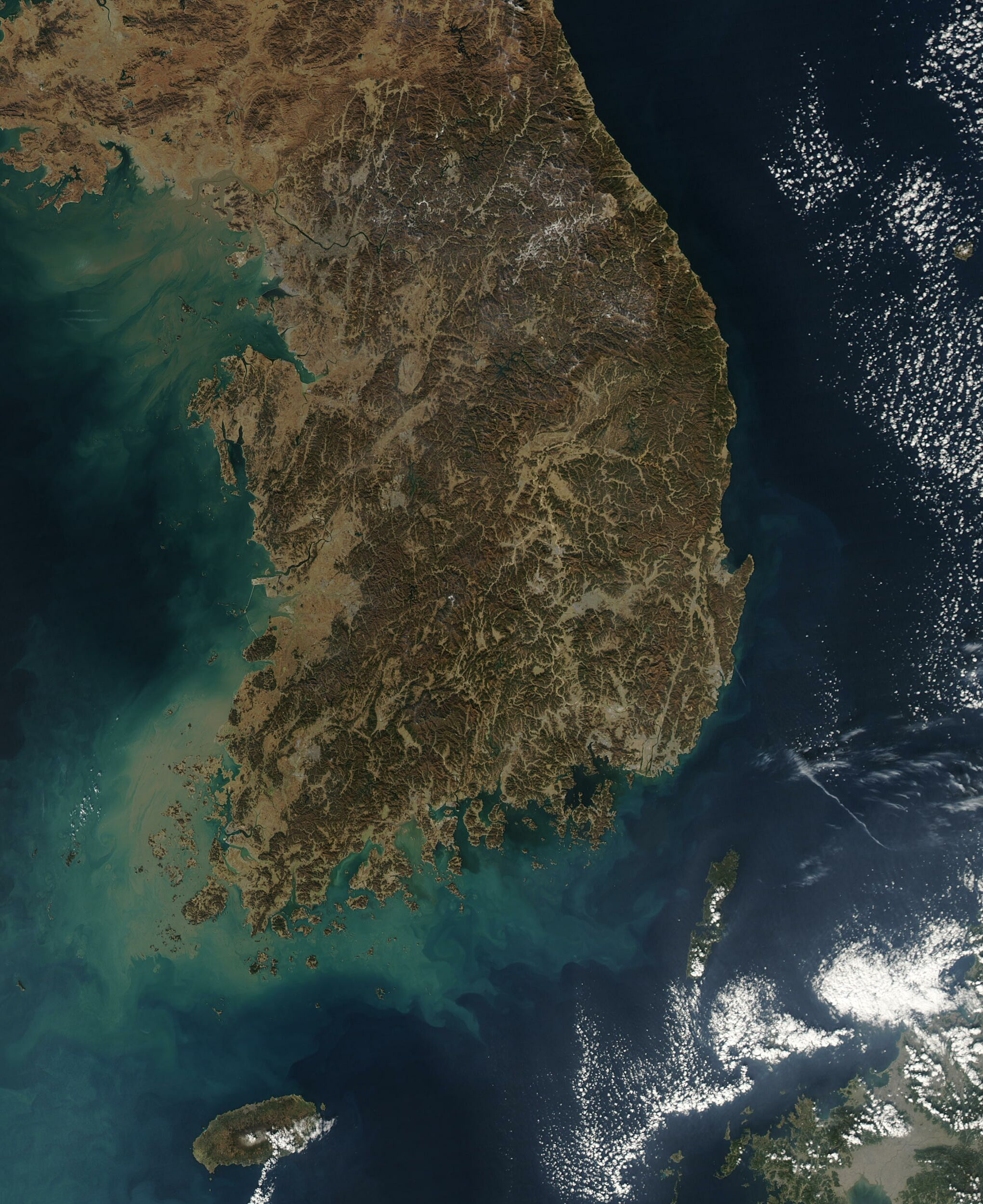
Satellite image of South Korea.

The Korean Peninsula extends southward from the northeast part of the Asian continental landmass. The Japanese islands of Honshū and Kyūshū are located some 200 kilometers (124 miles) to the southeast across the Korea Strait, and the Shandong Peninsula of China lies 190 kilometers to the west. The west coast of the peninsula is bordered by the Korea Bay to the north and the Yellow Sea and Korea Strait to the south; the east coast is bordered by the East Sea. The 8,640-kilometer coastline is highly indented. Some 3,579 islands lie adjacent to the peninsula, most found along the south and west coasts.

After World War II and before 25 June 1950, the line between the two Korean states was the thirty-eighth parallel of latitude. After the Korean War, the Korean Demilitarized Zone (DMZ) formed the boundary between the two. The DMZ is a heavily guarded, 4,000-meter-wide strip of land that runs along the demarcation line established by the Korean Armistice Agreement from the east to the west coasts for a distance of 241 kilometers (238 kilometers of that line from the land boundary with North Korea).

The total land area of the peninsula, including the islands, is 223,170 square kilometers. Some 44.8 percent (100,210 square kilometers) of this total, excluding the area within the DMZ, constitutes the territory of the Republic of Korea. The combined territories of North Korea and South Korea are about the same size as the United Kingdom. South Korea alone is about the size of Portugal or Hungary, or the U.S. state of Indiana.

The largest island, Jeju Province, lies off the southwest corner of the peninsula and has a land area of 1,848 square kilometers. Other important islands include Ulleung and Liancourt Rocks in the East Sea and Ganghwa Island at the mouth of the Han River. Although the eastern coastline of South Korea is generally unindented, the southern and western coasts are jagged and irregular. The difference is caused by the eastern coast gradually rising while the southern and western coasts are subsiding.

== Topography and drainage ==
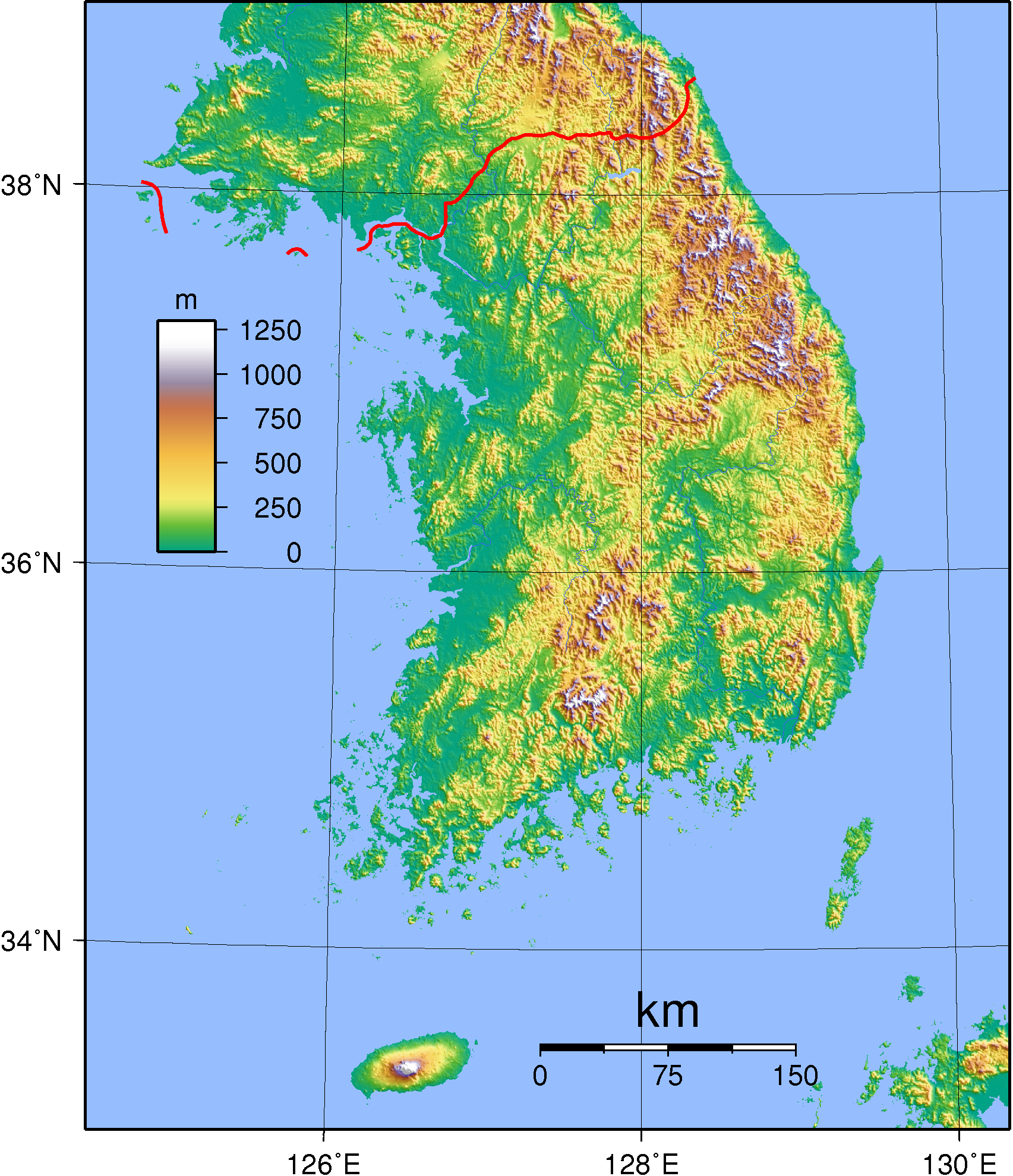
Topography of South Korea

South Korea is largely mountainous, with three-fourths of its landmass consisting of mountains. Early European visitors to Korea remarked that the land resembled "the sea in a heavy gale" because of the large number of successive mountain ranges. Many mountains exceeding 1,000 m (3,281 ft), which are concentrated in the north and the east, form the "topological backbone" of the country. There are two major mountain ranges within South Korea: the Taebaek Mountains, and the Sobaek Mountains. The highest mountain peak in South Korea is Hallasan (1,950 m (6,398 ft)), which is the cone of a volcanic formation constituting Jeju Island. Geologically, Precambrian rocks such as granite make up the landmass.

Approximately 30 percent of the area of South Korea consists of lowlands, with the rest consisting of uplands and mountains. The great majority of the lowland area lies along the coasts, particularly the west coast, and along the major rivers. The most important lowlands are the Han River plain around Seoul, the Pyeongtaek coastal plain southwest of Seoul, the Geum River basin, the Nakdong River basin, and the Yeongsan River and the Honam plains in the southwest. A narrow littoral plain extends along the east coast. A recent global remote sensing analysis suggested that there were 1,833 kilometers^{2} of tidal flats in South Korea, making it the 17th ranking country in terms of how much tidal flat occurs there.

The Nakdong is South Korea's longest river (521 km (324 mi)). The Han River, which flows through Seoul, is 514 km (319 mi) long, and the Geum River is 401 km (249 mi) long. These three rivers have their sources in the Taebaek Mountains. Other major rivers include the Imjin, which flows through both North Korea and South Korea and forms an estuary with the Han River; the Bukhan, a tributary of the Han that also flows out of North Korea; and the Somjin. The major rivers flow north to south or east to west and empty into the Yellow Sea or the Korea Strait. They tend to be broad and shallow and to have wide seasonal variations in water flow.

In the early part of the 20th century and especially the period during and after World War II and the Korean War, much of the existing Korean forests were cut down, which led to problems with flooding and soil erosion. Combination of reforestation efforts (e.g. Arbor Day was celebrated as a national holiday starting in 1949) and policies designed to reduce the use of firewood as a source of energy (e.g. restriction of inflow of firewood into Seoul and other major cities starting in 1958) helped to spark a recovery in the 1950s. Comprehensive reforestation programs starting in the 1970s and continuing into the late 1990s aided in an acceleration of forest volume increase. The forest cover reached a peak of 65% of national land area in 1980 as opposed to a low of 35% in 1955.

News that North Korea was constructing a huge multipurpose dam at the base of Geumgangsan (1,638 m (5,374 ft)) north of the DMZ caused considerable consternation in South Korea during the mid-1980s. In 1987, the Geumgangsan Dam was a major issue that Seoul sought to raise in talks with Pyongyang. Though Seoul completed a "Peace Dam" on the Pukhan River to counteract the potential threat of Pyongyang's dam project before the 1988 Olympics, the North Korean project still was in its initial stages of construction in 1990.

Maritime claims:
territorial sea: 12 nmi (22.2 km; 13.8 mi); between 3 nmi (5.6 km; 3.5 mi) and 12 nmi (22.2 km; 13.8 mi) in the Korea Strait
contiguous zone: 24 nmi (44.4 km; 27.6 mi)
exclusive economic zone: 200 nmi (370.4 km; 230.2 mi)
continental shelf: not specified

Elevation extremes:
lowest point: Sea level 0 m
highest point: Hallasan 1,950 m (6,398 ft)

== Climate ==
Köppen climate types of South Korea

Part of the East Asian Monsoon region, South Korea has humid continental and humid subtropical climates with four distinct seasons. The movement of air masses from the Asian continent exerts a greater influence on South Korea's weather than air movement from the Pacific Ocean. Winters are usually long, cold, and dry, whereas summers are short, hot, and humid. Spring and autumn are pleasant but short in duration. Seoul's mean temperature in January is −5 to −2.5 °C (23.0 to 27.5 °F); in July the mean temperature is about 22.5 to 25 °C (72.5 to 77.0 °F). Because of its southern and seagirt location, Jeju Island has warmer and milder weather than other parts of South Korea. Mean temperatures on Jeju range from 2.5 °C (36.5 °F) in January to 25 °C (77 °F) in July.

The country generally has sufficient rainfall to sustain its agriculture. Rarely does less than 750 millimeters (29.5 in) of rainfall fall in any given year; for the most part, rainfall is over 1,000 millimeters (39.4 in). Amounts of precipitation, however, can vary from year to year. Serious droughts occur about once every eight years, especially in the rice-producing southwestern part of the country. About two-thirds of the annual precipitation occurs between June and September.

South Korea is less vulnerable to typhoons than Japan, Taiwan, the east coast of China, or the Philippines. Typically one to three typhoons can be expected per year. Typhoons usually pass over South Korea in late summer, especially in August, and bring torrential rains. Flooding occasionally causes considerable damage, as do landslides, given the country's generally mountainous terrain.

In September 1984, record floods caused the deaths of 190 people and left 200,000 homeless. This disaster prompted the North Korean government to offer unprecedented humanitarian aid in the form of rice, medicine, clothes, and building materials. South Korea accepted these items and distributed them to flood victims.

Climate data for South Korea
| Month | Jan | Feb | Mar | Apr | May | Jun | Jul | Aug | Sep | Oct | Nov | Dec | Year |
|---|---|---|---|---|---|---|---|---|---|---|---|---|---|
| Record high °C (°F) | 23.6 (74.5) | 24.9 (76.8) | 29.6 (85.3) | 34.0 (93.2) | 37.4 (99.3) | 38.0 (100.4) | 41.5 (106.7) | 42.5 (108.5) | 37.7 (99.9) | 32.8 (91.0) | 29.4 (84.9) | 23.3 (73.9) | 42.5 (108.5) |
| Record low °C (°F) | −32.6 (−26.7) | −27.9 (−18.2) | −23.0 (−9.4) | −14.6 (5.7) | −4.7 (23.5) | −1.7 (28.9) | 4.4 (39.9) | 3.3 (37.9) | −2.3 (27.9) | −9.9 (14.2) | −18.7 (−1.7) | −26.8 (−16.2) | −32.6 (−26.7) |

| Month | Temperature | Date | Location |
|---|---|---|---|
| January | 23.6 °C (74.5 °F) | 7 January 2020 | Jeju City, Jeju Province |
| February | 24.9 °C (76.8 °F) | 21 February 2021 | Pohang, North Gyeongsang |
| March | 29.6 °C (85.3 °F) | 26 March 2025 | Jeonju, North Jeolla Province |
| April | 34.0 °C (93.2 °F) | 28 April 2005 | Yeongdeok, North Gyeongsang |
| May | 37.4 °C (99.3 °F) | 31 May 2014 | Daegu City, Daegu Province |
| June | 38.0 °C (100.4 °F) | 26 June 1958 | Daegu City, Daegu Province |
| July | 41.5 °C (106.7 °F) | 31 July 2026 | Yangsan, South Gyeongsang |
| August | 42.5 °C (108.5 °F) | 2 August 2026 | Yangsan, South Gyeongsang |
| September | 37.7 °C (99.9 °F) | 19 September 2024 | Yangsan City, South Gyeongsang Province |
| October | 32.8 °C (91.0 °F) | 1 October 2022 | Gangneung, Gangwon Province |
| November | 29.4 °C (84.9 °F) | 2 November 2023 | Gyeongju, North Gyeongsang Province |
| December | 23.3 °C (73.9 °F) | 17 December 1936 | Jeju City, Jeju Province |

| Month | Temperature | Date | Location |
|---|---|---|---|
| January | −32.6 °C (−26.7 °F) | 5 January 1981 | Yangpyeong County, Gyeonggi Province |
| February | −27.9 °C (−18.2 °F) | 6 February 1969 | Chun Cheon, Gangwon Province |
| March | −23.0 °C (−9.4 °F) | 8 March 1983 | Daegwallyeong, Pyeongchang Province |
| April | −14.6 °C (5.7 °F) | 2 April 1972 | Daegwallyeong, Pyeongchang Province |
| May | −4.7 °C (23.5 °F) | 16 May 1977 | Daegwallyeong, Pyeongchang Province |
| June | −1.7 °C (28.9 °F) | 1 June 2010 | Daegwallyeong, Pyeongchang Province |
| July | 4.4 °C (39.9 °F) | 5 July 1976 | Daegwallyeong, Pyeongchang Province |
| August | 3.3 °C (37.9 °F) | 27 August 1977 | Daegwallyeong, Pyeongchang Province |
| September | −2.3 °C (27.9 °F) | 23 September 1980 | Daegwallyeong, Pyeongchang Province |
| October | −9.9 °C (14.2 °F) | 25 October 1982 | Daegwallyeong, Pyeongchang Province |
| November | −18.7 °C (−1.7 °F) | 22 November 1973 | Daegwallyeong, Pyeongchang Province |
| December | −26.8 °C (−16.2 °F) | 24 December 1973 | Wonju, Gangwon Province |

=== Rainy season ===
The rainy season of South Korea refers to a phenomenon in which it rains continuously for several days in the summer or rainy season, or the weather, or the rain itself. On average, the rainy season is 30 to 35 days, but it does not continue to rain during this period. It rains for about 15 to 20 days, and among them, it falls only for about 12 to 16 days due to the stagnant front. However, the rainy season varies greatly from year to year. The rainy season is representative of summer weather in East Asian countries, including the Republic of Korea, and accounts for more than 30% of the precipitation on the Korean Peninsula. For this reason, some call the rainy season the "fifth season." It is usually a form of torrential rain that pours suddenly and then stops. In particular, the recent rainy season is referred to as a "nocturnal rainy season," and it is often in the form of a lull during the day with local heavy rain pouring down at night. In the case of cloudy days, the upper layer may be heated rather than the ground during the day, and at night, the clouds trap the heat of the lower layer while the upper layer cools, so convection develops. Considering that showers come during the day, nights account for a high percentage of 55%. A distinct congestion front is created between the cold and humid Okhotsk Sea air mass located on the northern Russian coast and the hot and humid North Pacific air mass near the Ogasawara Islands, resulting in a rainy season. However, in the case of the Korean Peninsula, not only the Okhotsk Sea air mass but also the cold and dry Siberian air mass contributes to the rainy season. Another cause of the rainy season is said to be the Bering Sea and the Tibetan Plateau. To be exact, the speed of high-pressure formation varies depending on the amount of ice in the Bering Sea and the amount of snow accumulated in the Tibetan Plateau, as the rainy season begins with the speed at which each high pressure in the north and south of the Korean Peninsula moves. For this reason, rainy seasons are regarded as a kind of East Asian seasonal wind climate abroad. The rainy season ends when the North Pacific high pressure expands and the Okhotsk Sea fleet retreats. Since then, as the North Pacific high pressure began to dominate the Korean Peninsula, the heat wave began in earnest and entered the middle of summer. However, during the period from summer to autumn, as the North Pacific high-pressure contracts and cold air expands in the north, the stagnant front moves south again and settles near the Korean Peninsula, which is called the "Autumn rainy season" or "second rainy season." The autumn rainy season generally occurs between late August and early September, and although it is usually shorter than the early summer rainy season, it sometimes pours more rain than the summer rainy season.

Due to severe climate change caused by global warming in India, daytime temperatures have risen to 32 degrees Celsius since mid-April and 39 degrees in late April, resulting in a strong heat wave in mid-summer, which also hit Korea in early June 2022.

The head of the Korea Meteorological Administration pointed out in 2022 that it was impossible to predict the recent heavy rain, and that the traditional expression of "rainy season" now seems to have expired.

=== Yellow dust ===
Asian Dust, known in Korea as the Yellow Dust, refers to a phenomenon in which when low pressure passes through the desert area of China, a large amount of yellow dust floats in the air or lands on the move due to strong winds and topography, affecting Korea. Yellow Dust occurs in desert areas in China and Mongolia, and the addition of several conditions to the sand particles generated here affects South Korea. Deserts where Yellow dust usually occurs include Taklamakan, Ordos, and Gobi. In South Korea, Yellow Dust usually occurs in spring, especially in April. Yellow dust has been recorded since ancient times, and the damage was not so severe because it was only a sandstorm in ancient times, but in modern times, the damage is getting worse due to China's rapid industrialization and desertification.

In summer or autumn, the roots of rain and plants play a role in holding onto the sand. However, in spring, the dry soil, which had been frozen throughout the winter, melts and breaks down into small pieces, resulting in small sand dust of less than 20 μm in size. When low pressure passes over the generated sand dust, it rises to a high sky of 3,000-5,000m by a strong ascending air current and then travels in westerlies and jets of about 30m per second. Since then, it has descended from Korea and Japan, where wind speed has slowed, and sometimes even moved to the United States (April 1998). It takes about two to three days to get to the Korean Peninsula from the origin. In South Korea, Yellow Dust is observed for 3 to 6 days mainly from March to May every year. In terms of the total number of observations nationwide, Jeolla-do (Gwangju, the region with the largest number of occurrences) has been observed. In terms of the number of days of occurrence, Seoul, Gyeonggi and the west coast are long. In rare cases, it was observed in Seoul in the winter of 1991 (30 November 1991 to 3 December). Early yellow dust occurred on 25 January 1999, and severe yellow dust occurred around 1 p.m. on 2 January 2001.

However, there is also a strange tendency, such as yellow dust in December 2022 in winter.

=== Typhoons ===
South Korea is less vulnerable to typhoons than Japan, Taiwan, the east coast of China, or the Philippines. From one to three typhoons can be expected per year. Typhoons usually pass over South Korea in late summer, especially in August, and bring torrential rains. Flooding occasionally causes considerable damage, as do landslides, given the country's generally mountainous terrain. Typhoons often occur from midsummer to early autumn, July, August, and September. Most of the typhoons invading the Korean Peninsula are concentrated during this period, and sometimes indirect effects occur in June and October. Even October has a direct impact and lands.In the summer, the water on the surface of the ocean, which received hot heat, evaporates and rises by convection and condenses, and the latent heat released heats up the surrounding water vapor again to the troposphere interface. In the case of typhoons heading to Korea, most of them fall into Japan, or Jeju Island, Gyeongsangnam-do, and Jeollanam-do are often directly damaged. However, In September 1984, record floods caused the deaths of 190 people and left 200,000 homeless. This disaster prompted the North Korean government to make an unprecedented offer of humanitarian aid in the form of rice, medicine, clothes, and building materials. South Korea accepted these items and distributed them to flood victims. As global warming progresses, the power of typhoons is likely to become stronger. In fact, hurricanes that occur in the Atlantic Ocean, where the average water temperature is 1 to 2 degrees higher than in the Pacific Ocean, are causing much more intensive damage than typhoons in the Pacific Ocean. Since 2013, the typhoon season has been delayed due to climate change, reducing summer typhoons and increasing autumn typhoons. The season came in October 2013, 2020, and November 2019. As a result, the number of super typhoons is increasing.

=== Temperature & precipitation patterns ===
- Annual rainfall ranges from 1,000 mm in the north to 1,700 mm along the southern coast; Seoul averages 1,370 mm, Busan1,470 mm
- Seoul specifics (1981–2010 normals):
  - Annual average temperature:12.5 °C; January daily mean –2.4 °C, July mean 24.9 °C .
  - Precipitation heavily skewed to summer: 63 % falls from June–August (892 mm)
  - Precipitation days:16 days in July,12 in August .
  - Humidity peaks at 80–90 % in July, dropping below 50 % in winter–spring

=== Climate change impacts ===
In 2023, South Korea had an average temperature of 13.7 °C, making it the warmest year on record at the time. This was followed by an even hotter 2024, with an average temperature of 14.5 °C, about 2 degrees above the country's 1991-2020 historical average of 12.3-12.7 °C. Because of this, the Korean Peninsula is predicted to be shifting towards a subtropical climate.

Due to the change in climate, Korean farmers are now able to cultivate subtropical crops, including bananas and papayas, and has increased their presence in the South Korean market.

The rise in temperature has also increased the frequency and intensity of wildfires in South Korea. Statistics from the Korea Forest Service show an increasing trend in wildfire activity between 2010 and 2024. In 2025, numerous wildfires in South Korea erupted, including a fire in North Gyeongsang that burned 99,289 hectares of land, making it the largest wildfire in South Korean history.

== Resources and land use ==
Natural resources
South Korea produces coal, tungsten, graphite, molybdenum, lead, and has potential for hydropower.

=== Land use ===
Arable land: 15.3%
Permanent crops: 2.2%
Permanent pasture: 0.6%
Forest: 63.9%
Other: 18.0% (figures as at 2011)

Approximately 17% (as at 2022) of the land surface of South Korea is used for crop production (including temporary crops), most of the remainder being mountains and hill land. South Korea is self-sufficient in rice and potatoes but depends on imports to support its dominantly urban population.

Irrigated land
8,804 km²

Total renewable water resources
69.7 km^{3}

Freshwater withdrawal (domestic/industrial/agricultural)
Total: 25.47 km^{3}/yr (26%/12%/62%)
Per capita: 548.7 m^{3}/yr

== Environmental concerns ==
=== Natural hazards ===
There are occasional big typhoons that bring high winds and floods. There is also low-level seismic activity, which is common in the southwest.

==== Volcanism and Earthquakes ====
Earthquake epicenter map in South Korea from Jan 2000 (M2.0 or higher).

Unlike Japan or the northern provinces of China, the Korean Peninsula is geologically stable. There are no active volcanoes (aside from Baekdu Mountain on the border between North Korea and China, most recently active in 1903), and there have been no strong earthquakes. Historical records, however, describe volcanic activity on Mount Halla during the Goryeo Dynasty.

Hallasan (elev. 1,950 m (6,398 ft)) is considered historically active although it has not erupted in many centuries. Earthquake activity is minimal; however, since 2016, there have been two earthquakes over 5.4 magnitude. Records of historical periods of Korean history (27AD to 1904), alongside data from surviving buildings, have been used to refine estimates for the severity of historical earthquakes both in and under the sea round the Korean peninsula.

=== Environment ===
==== Current issues ====
Habitat loss and degradation, especially of wetlands, through coastal reclamation (e.g. Saemangeum, Shiwa, Song Do, Namyang Bay, Asan Bay, in the south-west, Gwangyang Bay and the Nakdong Estuary) have caused huge declines in fisheries and of biodiversity. Most riverine wetland in Korea is now threatened by the proposed Grand Korean Waterway project. There are also some problems with air pollution in large cities; as well as water pollution from the discharge of sewage and industrial effluents. Drift netting is another issue.

==== International agreements ====
South Korea is a party to: Antarctic-Environmental Protocol, Antarctic-Marine Living Resources, Antarctic Treaty, Biodiversity, Climate Change-Kyoto Protocol, Desertification, Endangered Species, Environmental Modification, Hazardous Wastes, Law of the Sea, Marine Dumping, Ozone Layer Protection, Ship Pollution (MARPOL 73/78), Tropical Timber 83, Tropical Timber 94, Wetlands, Whaling

== See also ==
- Extreme points of South Korea
- List of national parks of South Korea
- List of islands of South Korea
- Lists of islands § Asia
- List of lakes of Korea
- List of rivers of Korea
- List of mountains in Korea
- Geography of North Korea
