= Daedeoksan =

Daedeoksan may refer to:

- Daedeoksan (North Gyeongsang/North Jeolla) in the city of Gimcheon, Gyeongsangbuk-do and the county of Muju, Jeollabuk-do. 1290 metres.
- Daedeoksan (Samcheok/Taebaek) in the cities of Samcheok and Taebaek, Gangwon-do in South Korea. 1307 metres.
- Daedeoksan (Samcheok) in the city of Samcheok, Gangwon-do. 697 metres.

== See also ==
- Taedoksan
