= Transportation in Seoul =

Seoul, the capital and largest city in South Korea, accounts for only 0.6% of the country's total land area, yet it is home to around 19% of the population. The population density in Seoul demands a great deal of the city's transportation systems, which are regarded by many as among the best and most advanced in the world. Seoul is very well connected by its subway and bus systems, and the city is also very supportive of pedestrian foot travel. In 2006 it won the Sustainable Transport Award.

== Airports ==
There are two airports that serve Seoul. Gimpo International Airport, formerly in Gimpo but annexed to Seoul in 1963, was the only airport for Seoul from its original construction during the Korean War. Multiple airports were built in and around Seoul immediately before, during, and after the war. The most famous was on Yeouido, which once served as the country's gateway to the world.

Upon opening in March 2001, Incheon International Airport on Yeongjong island in Incheon changed the role of Gimpo Airport significantly. Incheon is now responsible for almost all international flights. Following the opening of Incheon, Gimpo started only serving domestic flights, but has since started opening limited routes to major East Asian cities, such as Tokyo (Haneda Airport), Osaka (Kansai International Airport), Beijing (Beijing-Capital Airport), Shanghai (Shanghai–Hongqiao Airport), Taipei (Taipei–Songshan Airport).

Meanwhile, Incheon International Airport has become, along with Hong Kong and Singapore, a major transportation centre for East Asia. Following its opening in 2001, the airport opened a 3rd runway as well as a concourse extension in 2008, as well as Terminal 2 in 2018, with additional expansions currently under construction. Incheon International Airport has also frequently been voted amongst the best airports in the world, by Skytrax and Airports Council International.

Incheon and Gimpo are linked to Seoul and the rest of the country by highways, as well as urban rail service. The Incheon International Airport Railroad (or AREX, and styled as A'REX) station is located in the Transport Centre adjacent to the main terminal building provides urban rail services to Gimpo Airport and Seoul. In addition, the Incheon Airport Maglev also operates from the airport. As for Gimpo Airport, besides the AREX line, it is also connected to the Seoul Metropolitan Subway, as Gimpo Airport station offers services on Line 5, Line 9, Gimpo Goldline and the Seohae Line.

== Bus ==
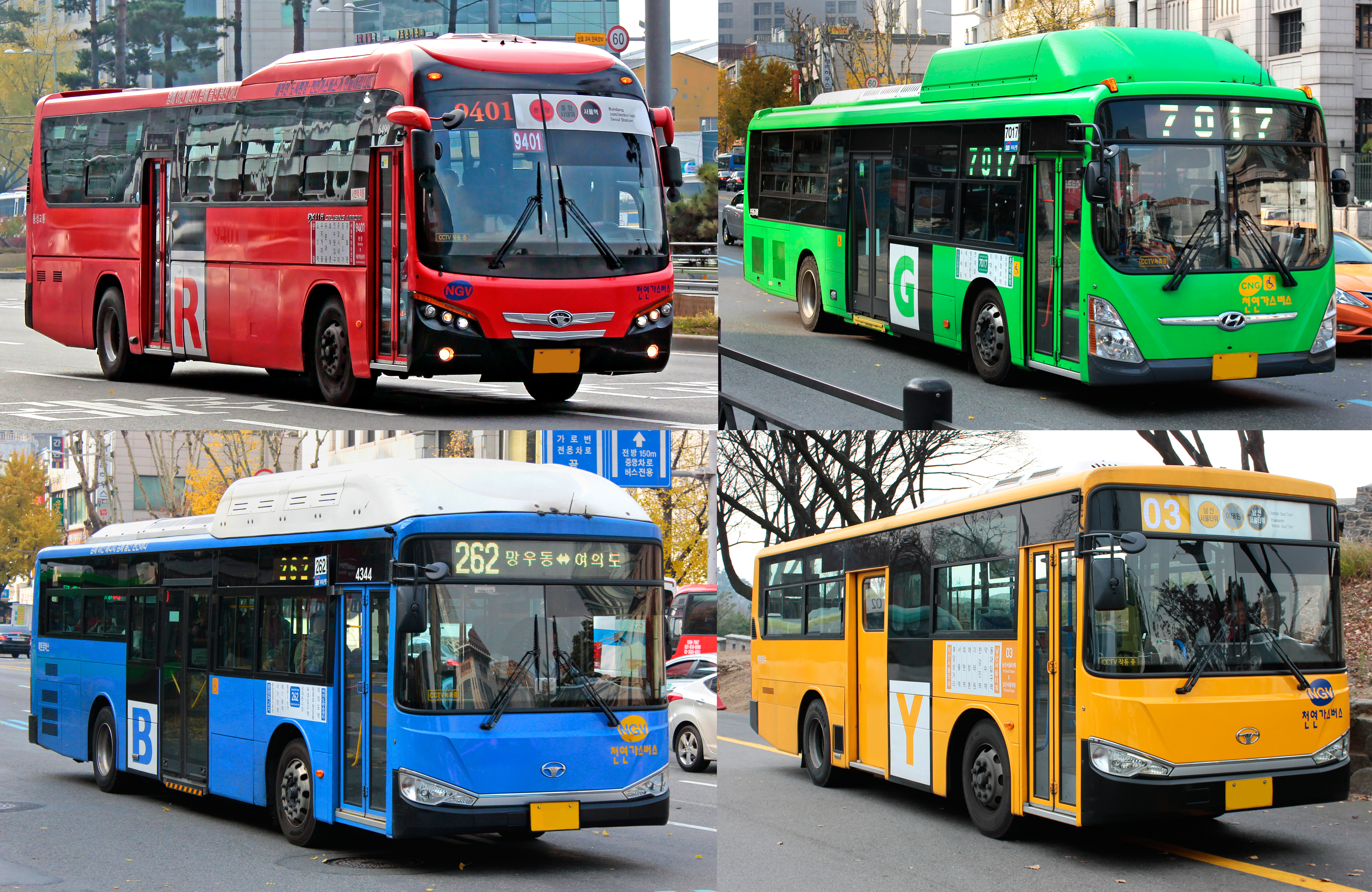
Branch bus

There are four types of buses:

- Red, "regional" buses that connect Seoul to inner suburbs.
- Blue, "mainline" buses that act as supplementary mainline transportation.
- Green, "branch-line" buses that extensively cover a certain area.
- Yellow, "loop-line" buses that loop around a certain area.

=== Intercity Bus Terminals ===
Seoul has many big intercity bus terminals. These buses connect Seoul to cities all around Korea. Major bus terminals include:

- Seoul Express Bus Terminal and Central City in Banpo-dong, Seocho-gu
- Seoul Nambu Terminal, also in Seocho-dong, Seocho-gu
- Dongseoul Bus Terminal in Gwangjin-gu

There are also a number of former bus terminals, including but not limited to:

- Sangbong Terminal in Jungnang-gu, closed due to low passenger numbers
- Dongmajang Terminal in Dongdaemun-gu, consolidated into Sangbong and Dongseoul Terminals
- Seoul Western Bus Terminal in Eunpyeong-gu, closed due to financial difficulties
- Yongsan Terminal in Yongsan-gu, consolidated into Nambu Terminal

== Subway ==
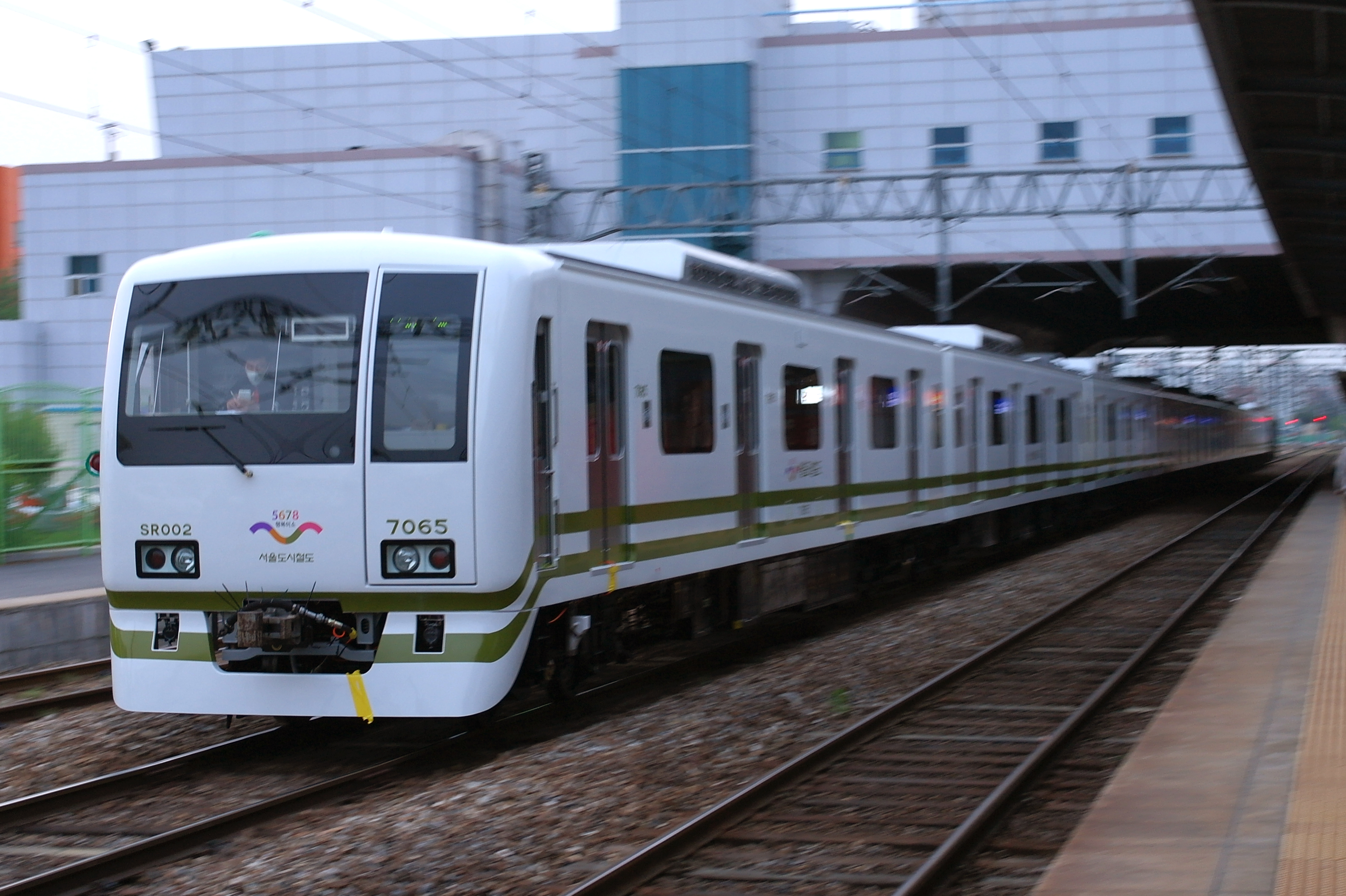
Subway in Seoul

Seoul city government owns 11 metro and light metro lines that interlink every district of the city with one another and with the surrounding area. The majority of the population now uses the public transportation system due to its convenience and low cost. With more than 8 million passengers a day, Seoul has one of the busiest subway systems in the world. Despite this, it is highly regarded for its efficiency, its ease of navigation, its timeliness, and for the allure of all the shops and attractions that are present inside the subway system itself.

== Taxi ==
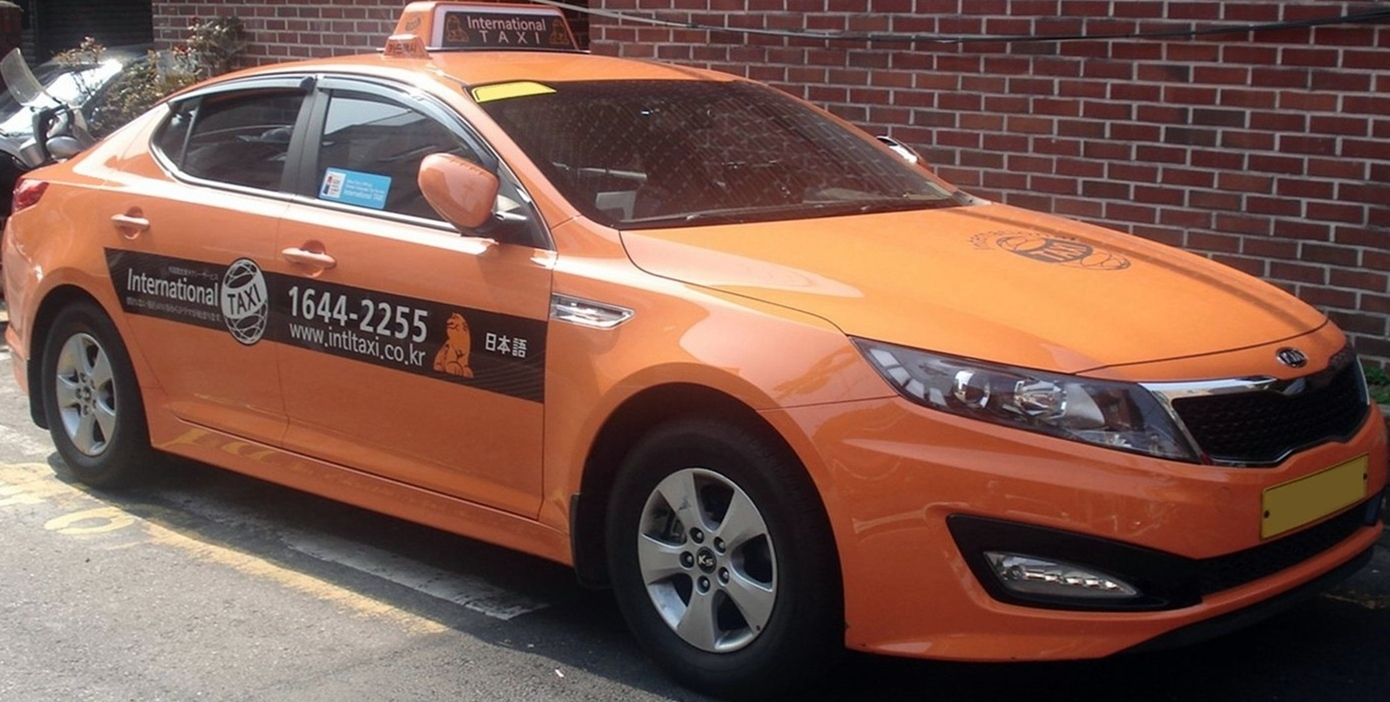
Taxi in Seoul

There are two tiers of taxis – regular (일반 택시, Ilban taxi), and deluxe (모범 택시, mobeom taxi).

Regular taxis start at 3800 won for the first two kilometers and are metered at 100 won every 132 meters, which equates to about 758 won per kilometer. If the taxi is going less than 15 km per hour, an additional charge of 100 KRW per 31 seconds is added to the fare. A 20% surcharge is added between midnight and 4 am. These are typically white or silver in color but also can be seen in yellow

Deluxe taxis start at 6500 won for the first three kilometers and are metered at 200 won every 151 meters, which equates to about 1325 won per kilometer. If the taxi is going less than 15 km per hour, an additional charge of 200 KRW per 36 seconds is added to the fare. Their name could also be translated as "Model Taxi" as their service should be an example of what a proper taxi is. Deluxe taxis do not have nightly surcharges.

International taxis 20% more expensive than regular and deluxe taxis. Their drivers speak English.

Seoul city council announced Seoul regular taxis will be repainted. They selected colour called Seoul Orange; look like similar orange or mud yellow. They are going to complete the painting until 2016.

== Train ==
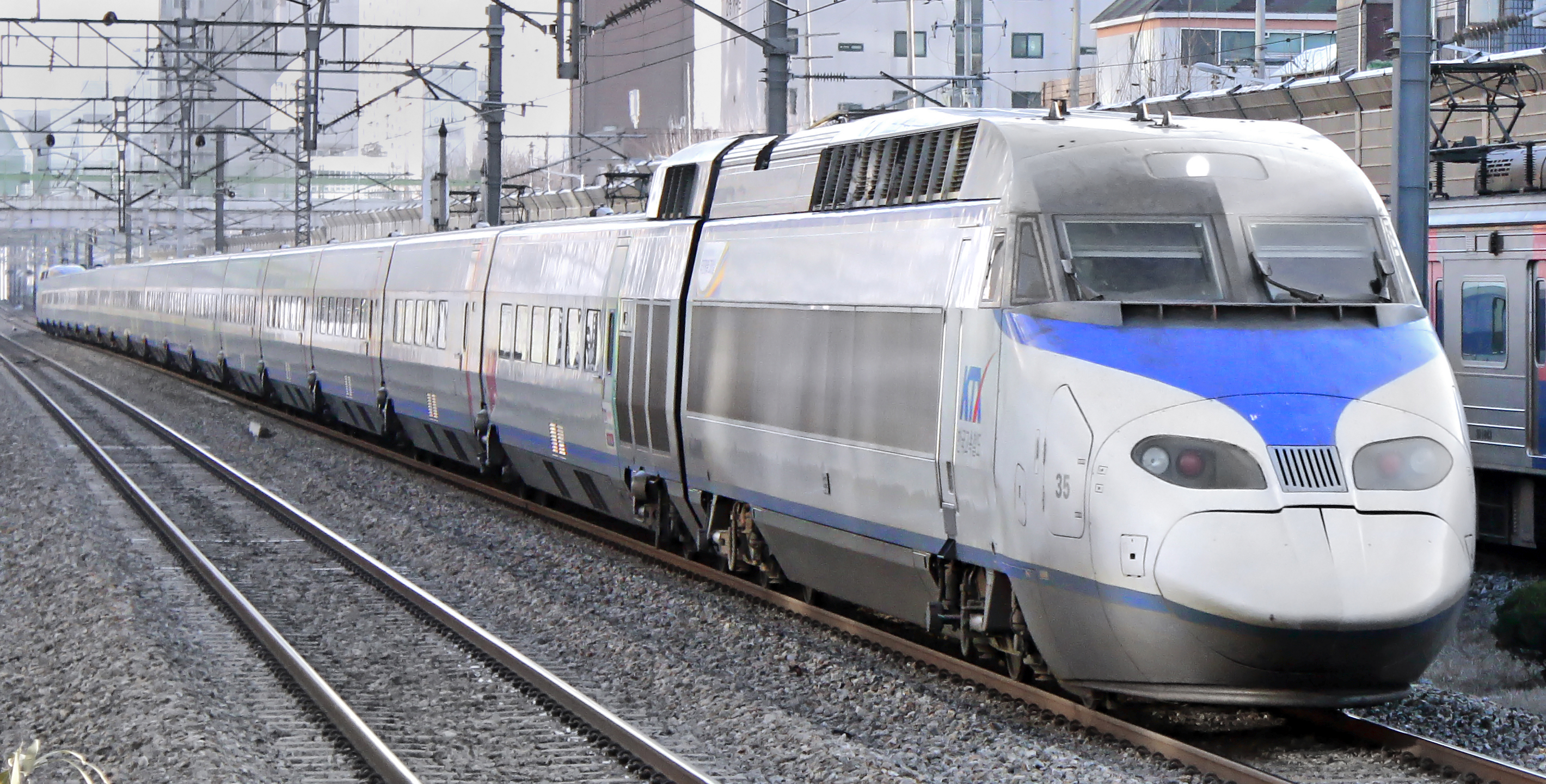
KTX

Seoul, being the national capital, is naturally where most of the major intercity rail and high-speed rail services terminate. This includes the KTX and SRT high-speed services 300 km/h services, and ITX services on conventional rail lines.

Major railroad stations are:

- Seoul Station, Jung-gu – conventional rail and HSR services toward Busan, Daegu, Changwon, Pohang, Gangneung, and Donghae
- Yongsan station, Yongsan-gu – conventional rail and HSR services toward Iksan, Gwangju, Mokpo, Jeonju, and Yeosu (KTX/ITX/Mugunghwa-ho), as well as ITX-Cheongchun services to Chuncheon
- Yeongdeungpo station, Yeongdeungpo-gu – conventional rail services toward Busan, Mokpo, Yeosu, etc. as well as HSR service toward Busan via Suwon
- Cheongnyangni station, Dongdaemun-gu – conventional rail and upgraded higher-speed line services toward Gangneung, Donghae, Wonju, Andong, Bujeon, and Chuncheon
- Suseo station, Gangnam-gu – SRT services to Mokpo, Yeosu, Busan, Changwon, and Pohang.

There are also several other stations from which one can take some services, including but not limited to:

- Oksu station and Wangsimni station – ITX-Cheongchun services to Chuncheon
- Sangbong station – some ITX-Cheongchun services as well as some KTX services to Gangneung, Donghae, and Andong.
- Pangyo station – technically not within the city, offers KTX services to Chungju
- Gwangmyeong station – technically not within the city, services most HSR services that stop at Seoul and Yongsan stations.

== Water transport ==
The first water bus service in Seoul and South Korea in general, Hangang Bus, on 18 September 2025. The service connects seven piers and operates 14 trips from 11 a.m. to 10:30 p.m using eight ferries.

== Payment ==
The most common form of payment that seamlessly works for the public buses and subways in Seoul is the Tmoney transportation card. It is purchasable for 2,500 won from machines at each subway station, as well as from most prominent convenience stores in Seoul. Money is able to be loaded onto the card, and then the card is tapped to a sensor whenever you enter or exit a bus or subway station, with the proper fare being deducted from the card's balance. Many taxis also accept the Tmoney card; those that do will often have a Tmoney logo showing on their vehicle.

International tourists have an alternative card that they can purchase for 4,000 won: the KOREA TOUR CARD. This card works very similarly to the Tmoney card, but it also provides discounts to many popular tourist attractions.

Transportation cards are not required to travel around Seoul, as cash and credit cards can also be used to buy tickets for each individual mode of transportation, though this requires buying a new ticket each time you travel. Additionally, transportation cards give slight discounts on travel fares and allow up to four transfers between Seoul subways and/or buses with no additional charges.

Foreign visitors also have the option to purchase a Korea Rail Pass from KORAIL (Korea Railroad Corporation) if they plan to travel by train frequently. The Korea Rail Pass allows individuals to ride on any supported train within the timeframe that the card is purchased for without any extra fees.

== See also ==
- Plug-in electric vehicles in South Korea § Seoul
