= Yangjicheon =

Watercourse in South Korea

Coordinates: 35°21′N 127°11′E

Yangjicheon (Korean: 양지천) is a river of South Korea. It is a tributary of the Gyeongancheon in the Han River system. The stream has been the site of some environmental cleanup. Long polluted, fish and insects have returned.
