= Han River (Korea) =

River in South Korea

Coordinates: 37°45′N 126°11′E

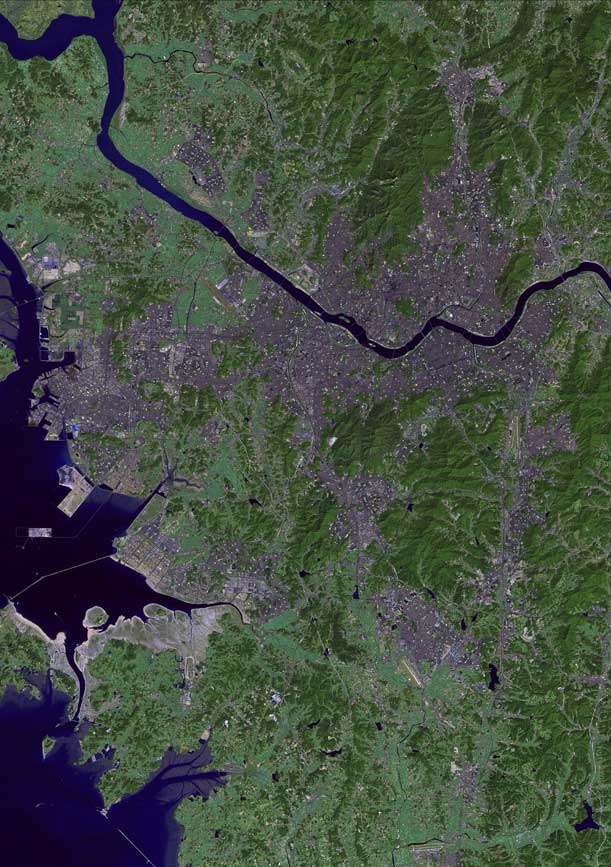
- Satellite image of the Han river flowing through Seoul (upper half of image; 2006)

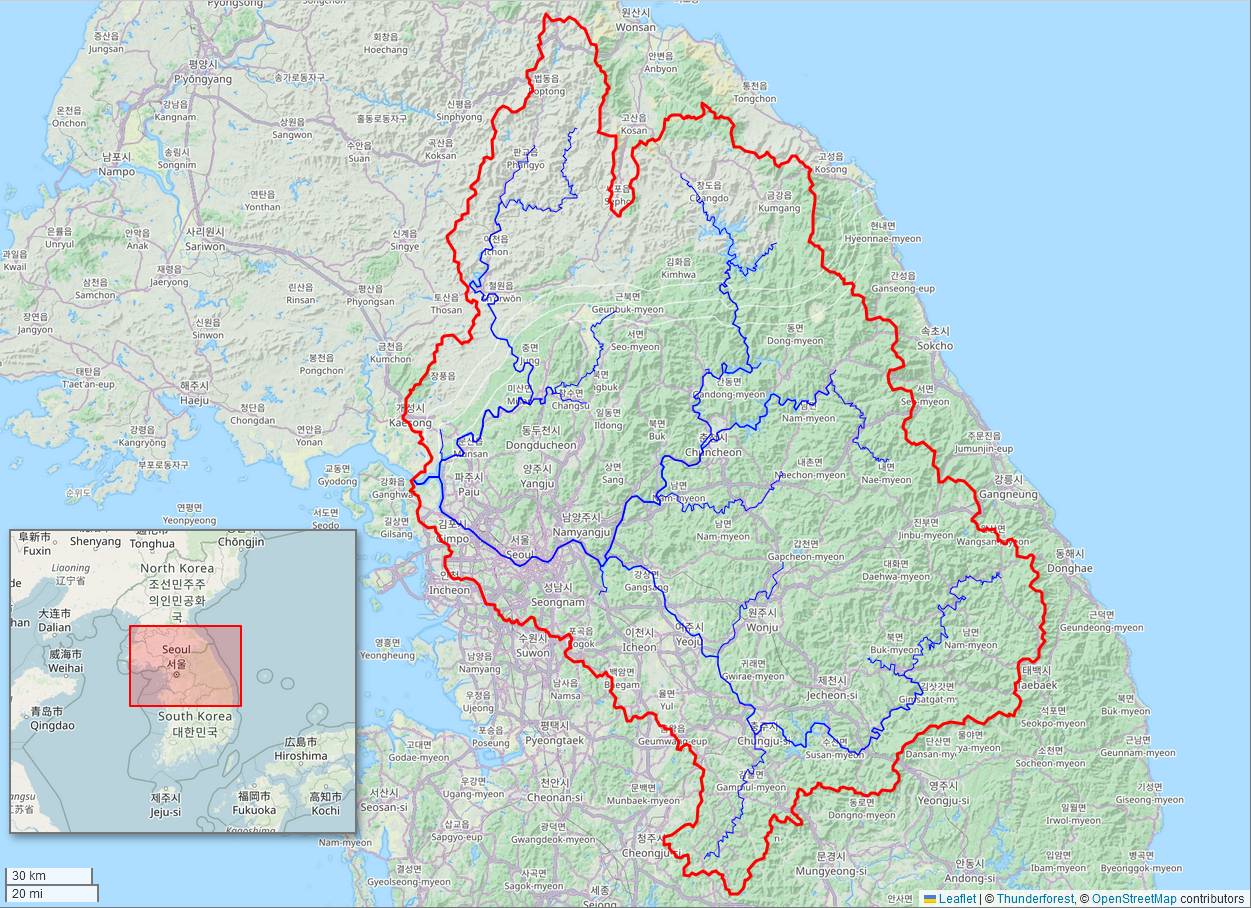
- The Han River watershed
- Etymology: Baekje Hanja, "Hansu" (漢水) (Note: Presumed to be a tranliterated form of ancient Korean, Hangaram" [the big river; 한가람])

Location
- Country: South Korea (KOR), North Korea (PRK)
- Provinces: Gangwon Province (KOR), Gyeonggi Province (KOR), Seoul (KOR), North Hwanghae Province (PRK)

Physical characteristics
- Source: Taebaek Mountains
  - location: Geumdae Peak, Taebaek, Gangwon Province, South Korea (Note: Geumdae Peak (1,418.1m, Korean: 금대봉; Hanja: 金臺峰; RR: Geumdaebong))
- Mouth: Yellow Sea
  - location: Northwestern tip of Gimpo peninsula, KOR-PRK border
- Length: 508 km (316 mi)
- Basin size: 35,770 km^{2} (13,810 sq mi)
- Discharge
  - location: Hangang Bridge, Seoul (Note: Discharge average from 2004 to 2013.)
  - average: 613 m^{3}/s (21,600 cu ft/s) (Note: Discharge average from 2004 to 2013.)

Basin features
- Tributaries
  - left: Dalcheon, Cheongmicheon, Bokhacheon, Gyeongancheon, Anyangcheon, Ara Canal †
  - right: Seom River, Bukhan River, Jungnangcheon, Gongneungcheon, Rimjin River
- † : Distributary of Han

- Han River
- Hangul: 한강
- Hanja: 漢江
- RR: Hangang
- MR: Han'gang

The Han River (Korean: 한강) is a major river in South Korea. It flows through the central region of the Korean Peninsula, with some of its tributaries and drainage basin in North Korea. The Han River currently has eight river islands: Nanjido, Yeouido, Ttukseom, Nodeulseom, Seoraeseom, Sebitseom, Bamseom, and Seonyudo.

The Han is the fourth longest river on the Korean Peninsula after the Amnok, Tuman, and Nakdong rivers. The river begins as two smaller rivers in the eastern mountains of the Korean Peninsula, which then converge near Seoul.

Seoul, the capital city of South Korea, is the only example of a major metropolis with such a wide river running through it; few large cities are divided by a massive river approximately 1.2 kilometers wide. The term "Miracle on the Han River", referring to South Korea's rapid economic growth, originates from this river.

== Etymology ==
The name Han River originates from the Korean word "Hangaram". In Old Korean, "han" means "big" or "great", and "garam" refers to a river—The Hanja character Han (漢) is a phonetic transcription. Until the early Three Kingdoms period, the Han River was called "Daesu" (帶水). It is recorded as Arisu (阿利水) on the Gwanggaeto Stele—an ancient stone monument erected in 414 AD. In the kingdom of Baekje, it was called "Ungniha" (郁利河). The Samguk sagi ("History of the Three Kingdoms"), a historical text, records the river as "Hansanha" (漢山河) or "Bukdok" (北瀆). The name "Han River" began to be used around the time when Baekje started interacting with China's Eastern Jin Dynasty; from then on, it was called "Hansu" (漢水) or "Hangang" (漢江).

Arisu (阿利水) is an archaic term used to refer to both the Han River and the Amnok River. Because of this historical significance, today it is also used as the brand name for tap water sourced from the Han River. The term seems to derive from ari, meaning "big" or "great", combined with su (水), which means "water". During the Goguryeo period, Arisu referred to the Han River. In the "Samguk sagi" (History of the Three Kingdoms), Baekje Annals Volume 3, in the account from early September of the 21st year of King Gaero, there is a record similar to that on the Gwanggaeto Stele in which the Han River is referred to as "Ungniha" (郁里河).

According to historical records from the Three Kingdoms period, Baekje referred to it as "Ungniha" or "Hansu," while in Silla, it was called "Wangbongha" or "Hansanha." During the Goryeo Dynasty, it was also known as "Yeolsu." Among the old names of the Han River, "Arisu" is the most familiar to modern Koreans.

In the 19th century, the river was attested to in one English-language source as the Han River or Hang Kang.

At one time, the Standard Korean Language Dictionary listed "Arisu" as a dialectal term for "deception", but due to insufficient data and lack of clear evidence, it was deleted.

There are records during the Goryeo period, that the Han River was also called Yeolsu (洌水), Sapyeongdo (沙坪島) and Sarijin. During the Joseon period, also as Gyeonggang (京江).

== History ==
=== Prehistoric Han River ===
Various Paleolithic and Neolithic artifacts have been discovered in the Han River basin, with Amsa-dong Prehistoric Site in Gangdong District representing the local area's Neolithic culture. Artifacts such as pottery, stone tools, and spearheads, which provide insights into their dietary habits, have been unearthed. It is believed that these people engaged in intensive foraging activities in hills and low mountains, utilizing primitive fishing techniques like handline fishing or spear fishing from an early period, using tools such as spears or harpoons to catch fish.

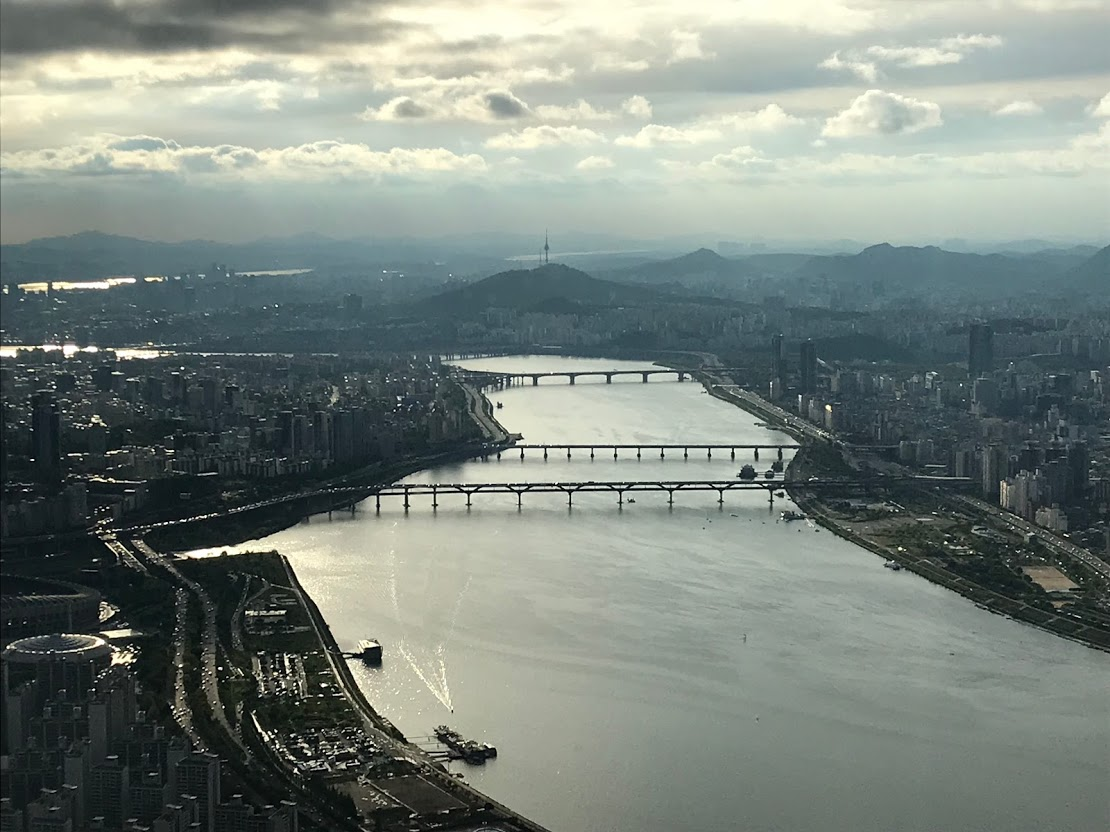
Han River through Seoul, aerial view

However, while handline and spear fishing were individual efforts with limited catch yields, net fishing enabled large-scale catches through collective labor in conjunction with foraging methods. Evidence of net fishing has been found at numerous archaeological sites. These communities accumulated surplus production through such collective activities, enhancing their adaptability to the environment and increasing their chances of survival. Consequently, their populations grew, settlements expanded, and stable, sedentary lifestyles emerged, leading to further cultural development. This progression laid the foundation for the emergence of ancient states in the Han River basin following the advanced cultures of the Bronze Age.

=== Bronze Age Han River ===
Geographically encompassing most of central Korea, the Bronze Age in the Han River basin was influenced by the northeastern regions of the Korean Peninsula (Hamgyeongbuk-do and Hamgyeongnam-do) and the northwestern regions (Pyeongannam-do and Hwanghae-do). This led to the establishment of the Bronze Culture in the Han River basin. The cultures of these two regions developed uniquely through their own progress and blending, creating a distinctive Bronze Age culture in the Han River basin. Additionally, the Han River basin served as an intermediary region that facilitated the spread of culture to the southern regions of the Korean Peninsula. By this stage, agriculture had further advanced compared to the Neolithic period.

Carbonized grains such as rice, barley, millet, and Job's tears were excavated from habitation sites, indicating that mixed grain farming had become widespread across the Korean Peninsula. It is also inferred that rice farming had become quite common in both the northwestern regions and the southern areas. Rice farming in the Han River basin is closely related to the southward movement of residents from the Pangyi (팽이) Pottery culture in the northwestern regions. As these southern-moving Pangyi Pottery people interacted and blended with the local Minmuni-toki-in (민무늬토기인) communities, rice farming became widespread in the Han River basin and further extended to the southern regions.

=== Three Kingdoms Period ===
During the Three Kingdoms period, the fortunes of nations were closely tied to the gains and losses of the Han River basin. This was because the Han River, as a major river flowing through the central part of the peninsula, became the central stage of the Korean Peninsula. Additionally, it was considered important for military, economic, social, and diplomatic reasons. Consequently, this region became a primary target in the power struggles among the three kingdoms, and controlling the Han River basin provided a strong foundation for territorial expansion and national development. As historical records show, Goguryeo, Baekje, and Silla alternately ruled the Han River basin. Occupying the Han River basin led to national prosperity, while losing it resulted in decline.

Baekje was founded in the basin of the Han River, and from the Three Kingdoms period onward, the zenith of each kingdom was determined by who controlled the middle and lower reaches of this river. Controlling the Han River was so crucial that it essentially defined a nation's golden age. Initially, Baekje held control, followed by Goguryeo, and later by Silla. As each kingdom rose to prominence, the other two would invariably form alliances to balance the power. This power dynamic continued throughout the entire Three Kingdoms period.

The importance of the Han River stemmed from its numerous advantages: the agricultural productivity of its basin, the securing of transportation routes through river navigation, and the establishment of maritime trade routes with China. It was the only region that could simultaneously connect major rivers flowing through the Korean Peninsula—such as the Taedong River, Geum River, Yeongsan River, and Nakdong River—and the shipping routes of the southwestern sea.

=== Unified Silla Period ===
After the unification of the Three Kingdoms, Silla designated the Hansanha (another name for the Han River) in the north as one of the nation's four great rivers, alongside the Hwangsanha (Nakdong River) leading to the South Sea, the Ungcheonha (Geum River) leading to the West Sea, and the Tojiha (Gokgangcheon in Heunghae-eup, Pohang) leading to the East Sea. These were collectively known as the "Four Waterways" (四瀆). The state held regular rituals (Jungsa, 中祀) for these rivers, underscoring their ideological importance.

=== Goryeo Dynasty ===
In the 21st year of King Munjong's reign, the importance of the Han River basin was recognized, and Yangju (now Seoul) was promoted to Namgyeong (Southern Capital), making it one of the three major strategic locations alongside Kaegyeong (New/Open capital) and Seogyeong (Western Capital). Later, in September 1382 (8th year of King U), the capital was moved to Hanyang(Another name for now Seoul). However, due to political and social unrest, along with the prevalence of geomancy and the belief that the new capital was inauspicious, the capital was returned to Gaeseong the following February.

During the reign of the last Goryeo monarch, Gongyang (1390), the capital was moved back again to Hanyang in September 1390. However, after the establishment of Hanyang, significant storms, thunder, lightning, and disasters struck the nation, causing frequent misfortunes like people being swept away by the river, alongside bad omens such as tigers killing men. As a result, in February 1391, the capital was moved back to Gaeseong, effectively ending the issue of relocating the capital (to Hanyang, or Seoul) within the Goryeo Dynasty.

The eventual relocation of the capital to Hanyang (Seoul) was achieved in 1394 when Yi Seong-gye founded the Joseon Dynasty.

=== Joseon Dynasty ===
After ascending to the throne, Taejo Yi Seong-gye ordered the relocation of the capital to Hanyang on 3 August 1392, sixteen days after his coronation. This was done on 25 October 1394 (lunar calendar).

After the capital relocation, the first time Seoul was the capital of any Korean nation since Baekje's Wiryeseong, the Han River grew in importance alongside the city's new prestiege. The Korean Peninsula, being a very mountainous region, has traditionally relied heavily on canal- and river-based water transport for everything from inter-province trade to taxes, which at the time were mostly paid in commodities.

The capital's position along the Han River meant that the allocation and transportation of grains and various commodities from various provinces to the capital was made much easier, allowing landlords residing in the capital to transport sharecropped grains from provincial (non-capital regions) farms to Hanyang via the river. Additionally, general goods within the capital were largely supplied by ships through the Han River. With the implementation of tax reforms and the introduction of the Daedong Law in the late Joseon period, the Han River's importance increased further, facilitating the transportation of rice collected from regions including Honam and Chungcheong Province by water. Thus, the Han River became a vital supply route for the state's grain reserves and national finances.

As mentioned above, during the Joseon Dynasty when river transport was central, the Han River served as a vital route through which goods from the Gyeonggi, Chungcheong, and Jeolla Provinces flowed into Hanyang. Additionally, when conducting rituals such as praying for rain at famous mountains and great rivers, the Han River was always included. Even today people set up ritual tables and offer prayers along the banks of the Han River during events such as Jeongwol Daeboreum (the first full moon of the lunar year).

=== Modern History ===
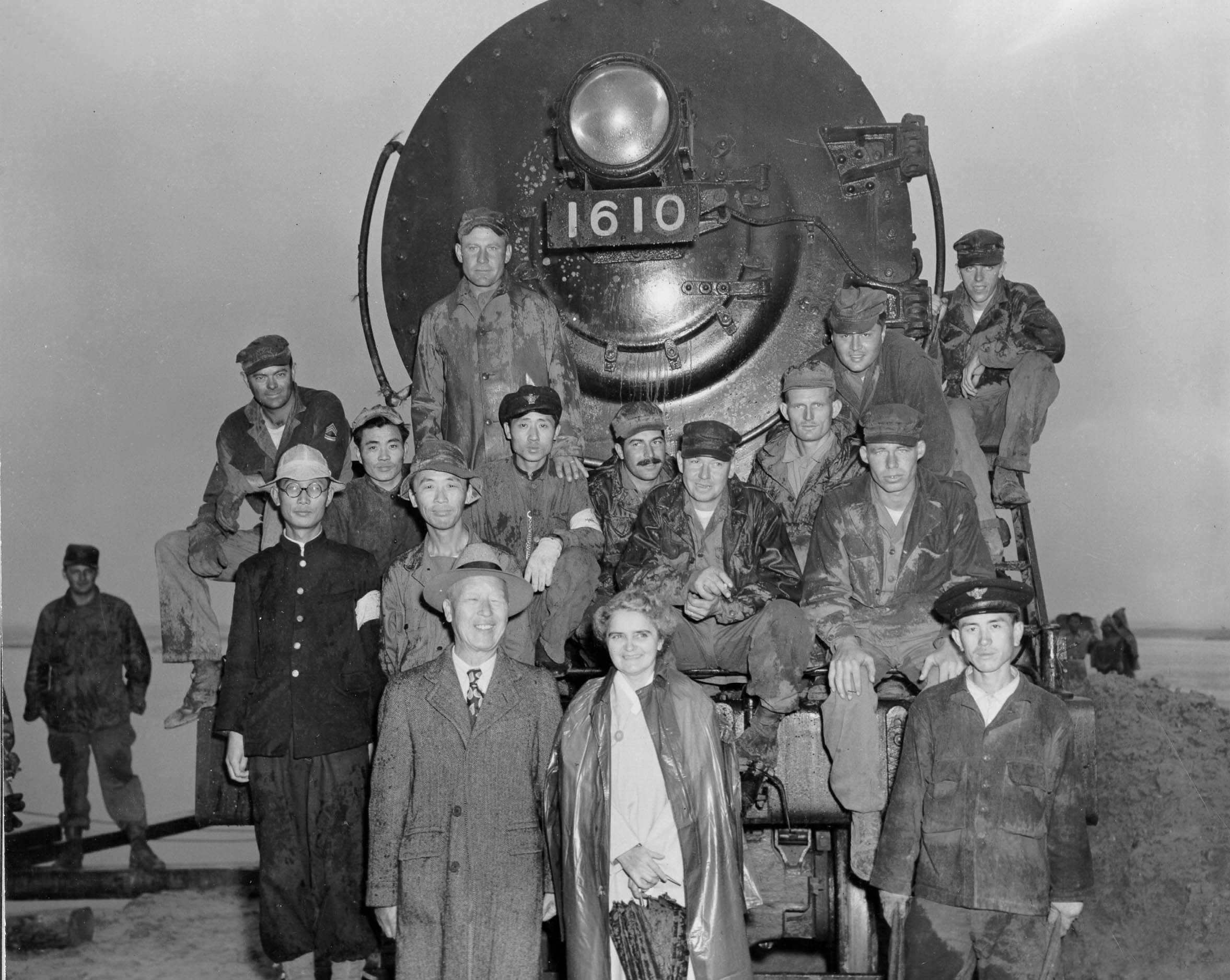
South Korean president Syngman Rhee and his wife posing with US Army Corps of Engineers personnel at the Han River Bridge in 1950

Within the first week of the start of the Korean War, the South Korean Army destroyed the Hangang Bridge in a bid to stem the advance of the invading North Korean military. In early 1951, there was a fair amount of fighting between Chinese People's Volunteer Army troops and US-led United Nations forces in the Han River area surrounding Seoul.

During the first few decades of South Korea's existence, the Han River became very polluted, as burgeoning industry and an impoverished populace used it as a convenient spillway for industrial and urban refuse. Though it no longer plays a central role in commerce or transportation, it is a prime fixture in the life of the South Korean capital. During the 1988 Summer Olympics in Seoul, the Han River was the site of the Olympic rowing regatta. It became the focus of government-sponsored environmental efforts to clean it up.

There have been fears, such as the 1986 Water Panic in South Korea, that North Korea could attack Seoul by releasing waters from upstream dams, creating floods downstream. In July 2000, the US military admitted to dumping 20 U.S. gallons (76 liters) of diluted formaldehyde in the sewer system connected to the river. As the river serves as a drinking source for some 12 million South Koreans, some South Koreans launched large protests and accused the US military of ignoring South Korea's environmental regulations. Activists lobbed toy rockets—filled with water from the river—into the main US Army base. The political party Green Party Korea had earlier accused the US of dumping nearly 60 gallons of the toxic chemical into the river, and said that "... if people are exposed to the chemical for a long period of time, it could cause lung cancer [and when] dissolved into water, it could kill fish and other aquatic creatures." The events inspired Bong Joon-Ho's acclaimed 2006 film The Host.

In 2012 the 18-kilometer Ara Canal, suitable for large container and passenger vessels, was completed, linking the Han River near Gimpo in Seoul to Incheon.

On 18 September 2025, the Hangang Bus ferry service began to operate along a portion of the Han River in Seoul, serving seven ferry piers.

=== Joint Utilization Zone ===
On 4 November 2018, a team of ten people from North Korea and ten from South Korea began a joint inter-Korean survey which will lead to the development a Joint Utilization Zone along the Han River's estuary. The zone will allow civilians to access the estuary for tourism, ecological protection and the collection of construction aggregate under the protection of militaries from both sides of the Korean border. On 5 November 2018, the councils of South Korea's Gangwon and Gyeonggi provinces, which border the DMZ, signed a "peace working agreement" at Dorasan Station in Paju, giving local approval to the Joint Utilization Zone.

== Geography ==
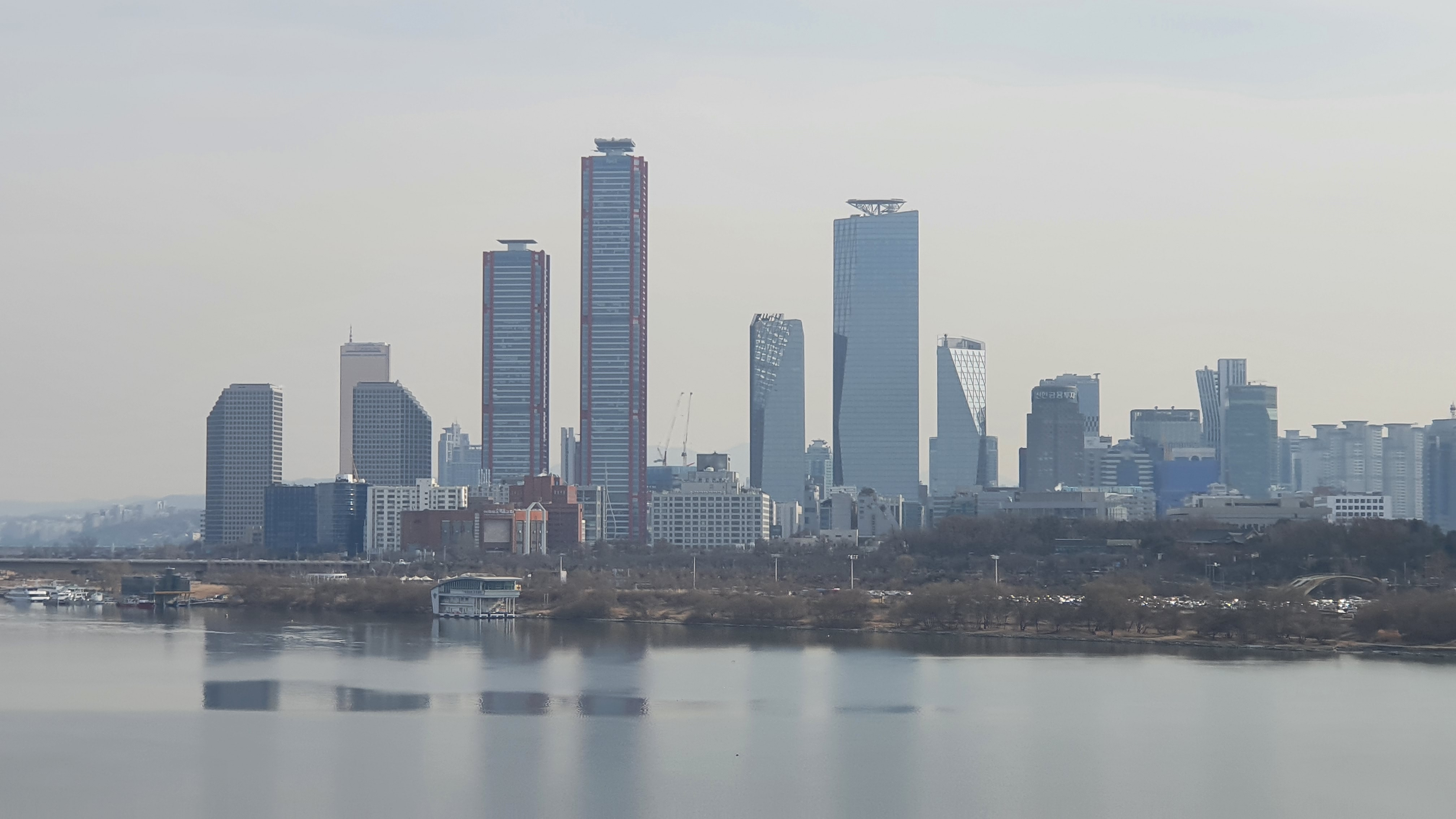
Yeouido, next to the Han river. which houses the National Assembly Proceeding Hall and many skyscrapers.

The Han River has an exceptionally high flow variability coefficient and is known for its excessively narrow basin. As a result, during heavy rains—such as monsoons or torrential downpours—the Jamsu Bridge becomes submerged, and even the expansive riverbanks and Hangang Park are entirely flooded. This illustrates the significant fluctuations in the river's water volume. Conversely, during the dry winter season, the river's width decreases considerably.

The Han River helps to reduce and mitigate the urban heat island effect. When the river flows normally, the kinetic energy of the water collides with the air to create wind, which helps circulate the surrounding air.

Several places in Seoul bear names derived from former boat crossings, such as Gwangjin (Gwangnaru), Mapo, Sangam Naru, Ttukseom Naru, Gongam Naru, Songpa Naru, Hangangjin, Yanghwajin (Yanghwa Naru), Sambat Naru, Dongjak Naru, Seogang Naru, Noryangjin (Nodeul Naru), and Yeongdeungpo. These names reflect the Han River's wide expanse and its suitability for river transport, highlighting its geographical features and advantages. Among them, Noryangjin (Nodeul Naru) was renowned as a key transportation hub, managing both passenger and grain transport on the Han River, leading to grain warehouses and fishing ports being established there. Even in the 2020s, Noryangjin is home to the Noryangjin Fisheries Wholesale Market.

The section of the Han River that flows through Seoul maintains a water level above a certain point due to the Singok Submerged Weir installed in Gimpo. This maintained water level is referred to as the "low water level" (jeosu-wi), and the filled section is called the "low water channel" (jeosu-ro). This is aesthetically pleasing and facilitates the operation of boats. Following the Han River Comprehensive Development Project, extensive aggregate extraction deeply excavated the riverbed, providing sufficient depth for tour boats even without the submerged weir. However, to accommodate docking and other activities, the submerged weir remains necessary unless additional dredging is performed near the docks.

The lower stretches of the Han River are lined with pedestrian walkways, bicycle paths, public parks and restaurants, particularly in Seoul. In a 2011 survey conducted by Seoul Development Institute of 800 residents and 103 urban planning and architectural experts, 51% of residents and 69% of experts voted the river the second most scenic location in the city, following Namsan in the top spot.

== Ecology ==
=== Plants ===
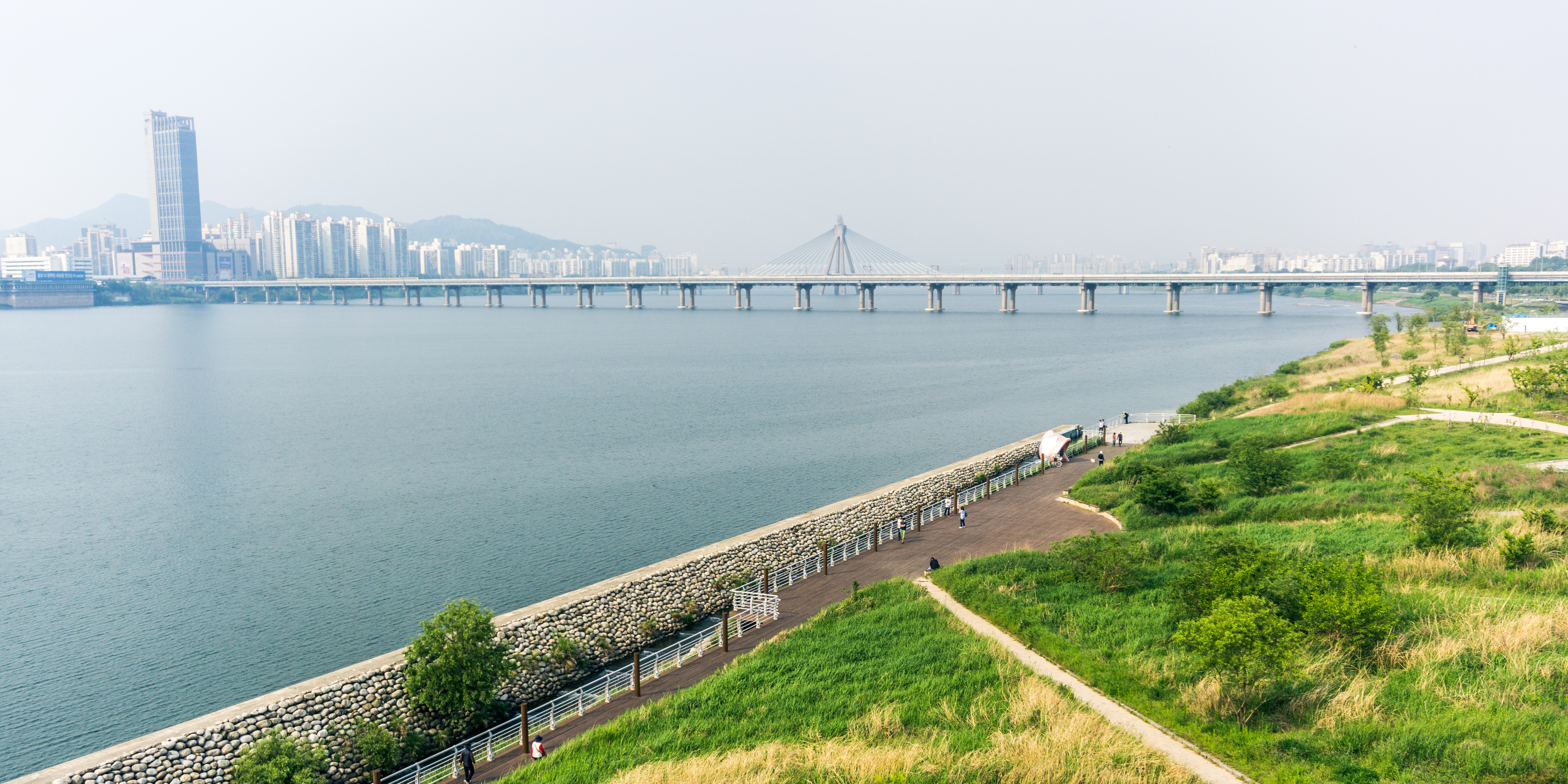
Han River and Han River Park from Jamsil Bridge

The riparian zones of the Han River are predominantly dominated by willow species in most areas, and locust trees are frequently found in some sections. Additionally, through planting efforts, species such as poplar, Eastern cottonwood, lacebark elm, pin oak, birch, and metasequoia are widely distributed. The found number of plant species has shown a continuous increasing trend, with 1299 types of plant life dispersed around the river in 2022. The number of newly planted species in parks and flower beds has significantly increased, and the number of native aquatic plants is also steadily rising.

=== Fish ===
A total of 19 families and 69 species were recorded, similar to the 2017 survey. The main river's fish species were relatively abundant, and Seoul's protected species, Gyeongmochi (Microphysogobio jeoni), Kkeokjeongi (roughskin sculpin), and Hwangbok (Takifugu obscurus), with the first and last being Korean endemics, were found. In the main stream of the Han River, Tridentiger brevispinis, Barbel steed, and Acheilognathus were the dominant species, while in the tributaries, Pale chubs, Stripe False Gudgeons, and Crucian carp were predominant.

=== Mammals ===
A total of 13 species, including water deer, raccoon dogs, moles, otters, and lynx, were identified. In the main stream, water deer were frequently observed, while wild cats and dogs were commonly found in the tributaries. Legally protected species include otters, which are designated as natural monuments and classified as Category I endangered wildlife, and lynx, classified as Category II endangered wildlife. Otters serve as indicator species for assessing ecosystem health and act as regulators of aquatic ecosystems by consuming non-native species such as bass and bluegill.

== Course ==
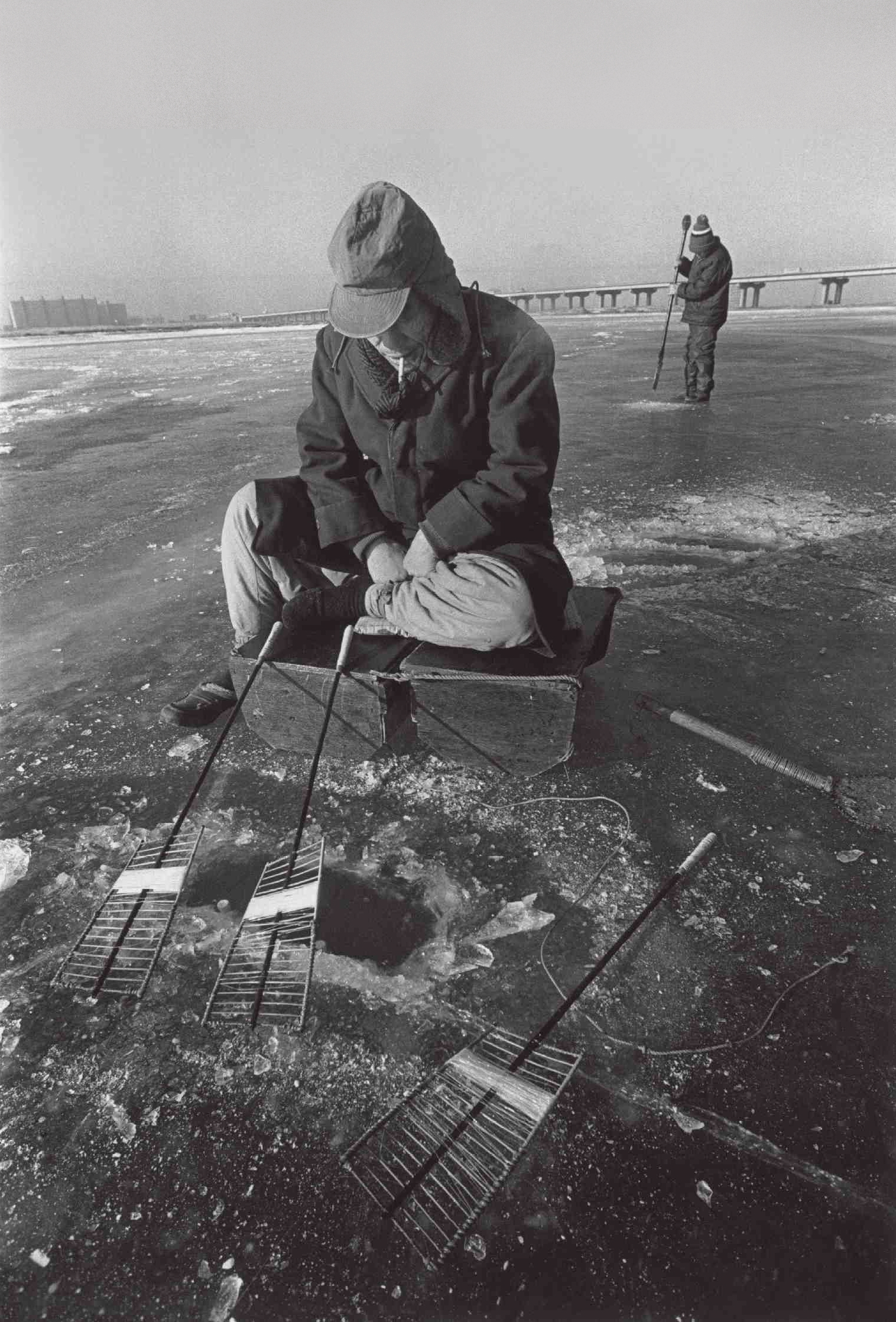
Ice fishing in the Han River (1977)

The Han River is formed by the confluence at Yangpyeong, Gyeonggi Province, of the Namhan River (South Han River), which originates from Daedeoksan, and the Bukhan River (North Han River), which originates on the slopes of Mount Kumgang in North Korea. The river flows through Seoul and then merges with the Imjin River (or "Rimjin River") shortly before it flows into the Yellow Sea. Broad tidal flats can be found at the mouth of the Han River, where it meets the sea along the Korean Demilitarized Zone that divides South and North Korea.

The total length of the Han River is approximately 514 kilometres (319 mi). Although it is not a long river, the lower Han River is remarkably broad. Within Seoul city limits, the river is more than 1 kilometre (0.62 mi) wide. Prior to the construction of several major dams, the river was known for its huge coefficient of river regime (ratio between the maximum and minimum amount of flow) of 1:390. (For comparison, the Thames and the Rhine have coefficients of 1:8 and 1:18, respectively.)

== Tributaries ==
Tributaries are listed in order from the mouth of the Han River to the source. Subtributaries are listed accordingly.

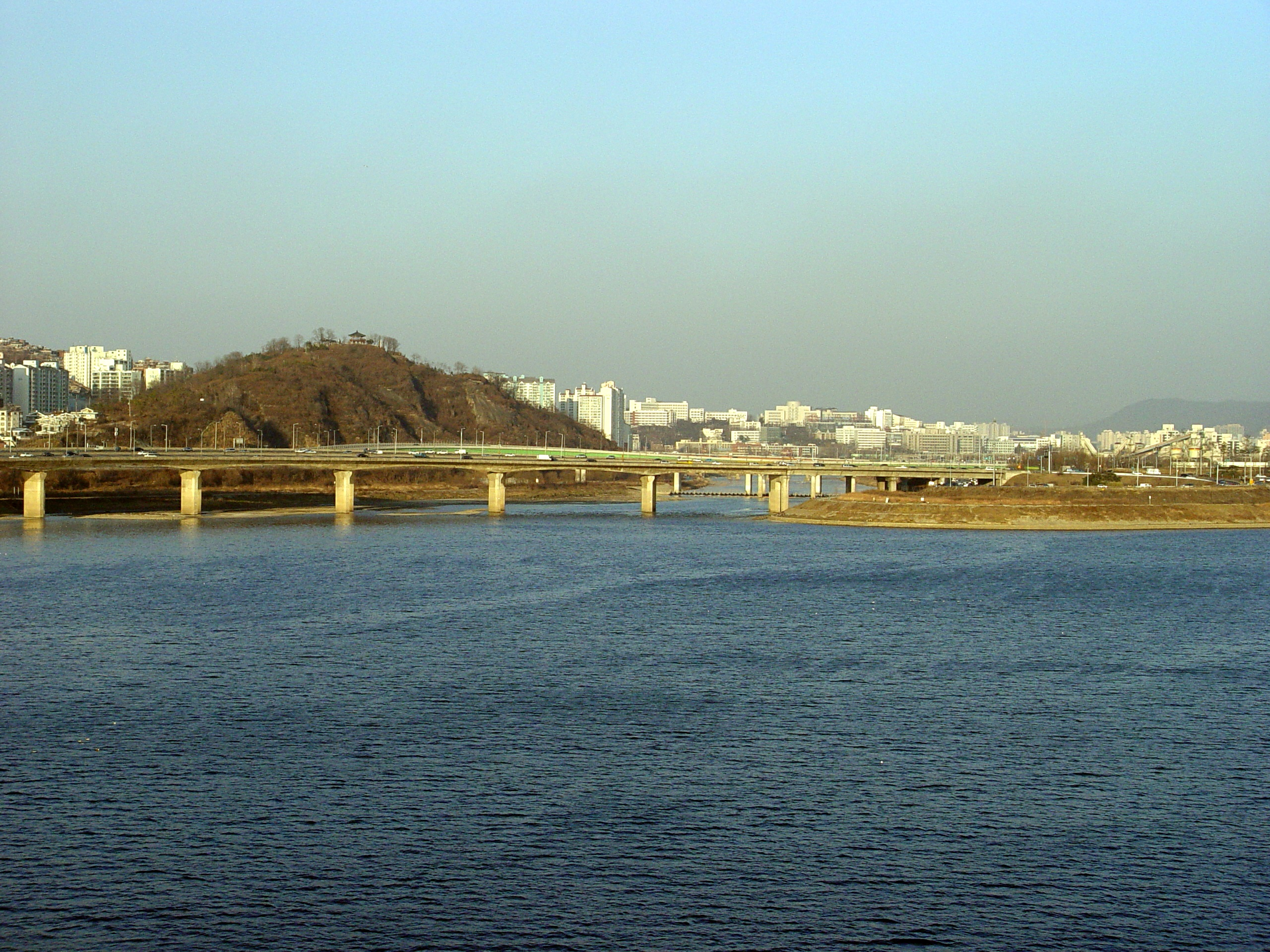
Jungnancheon meets Hangang, seen from Dongho Bridge

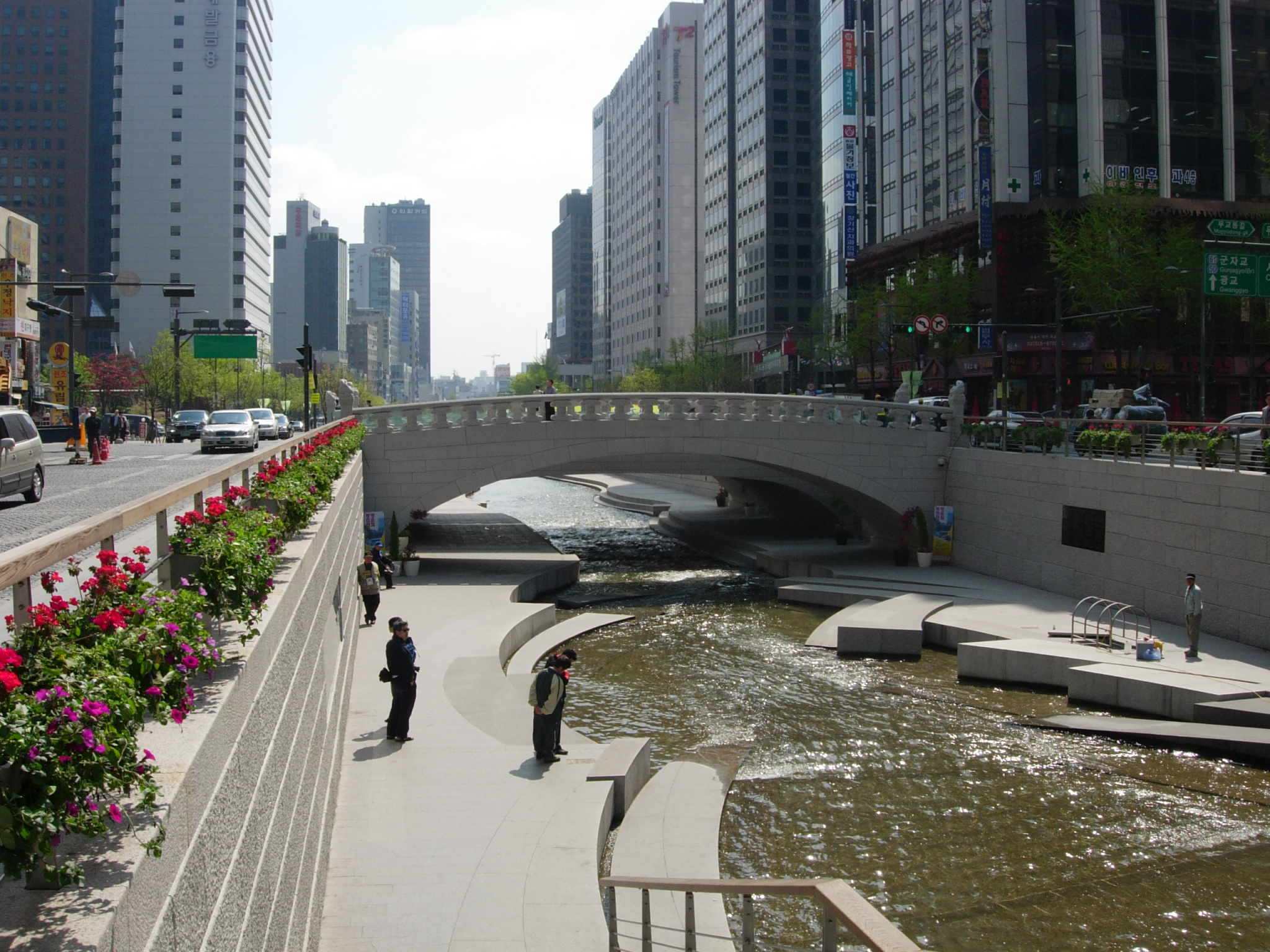
Cheonggyecheon

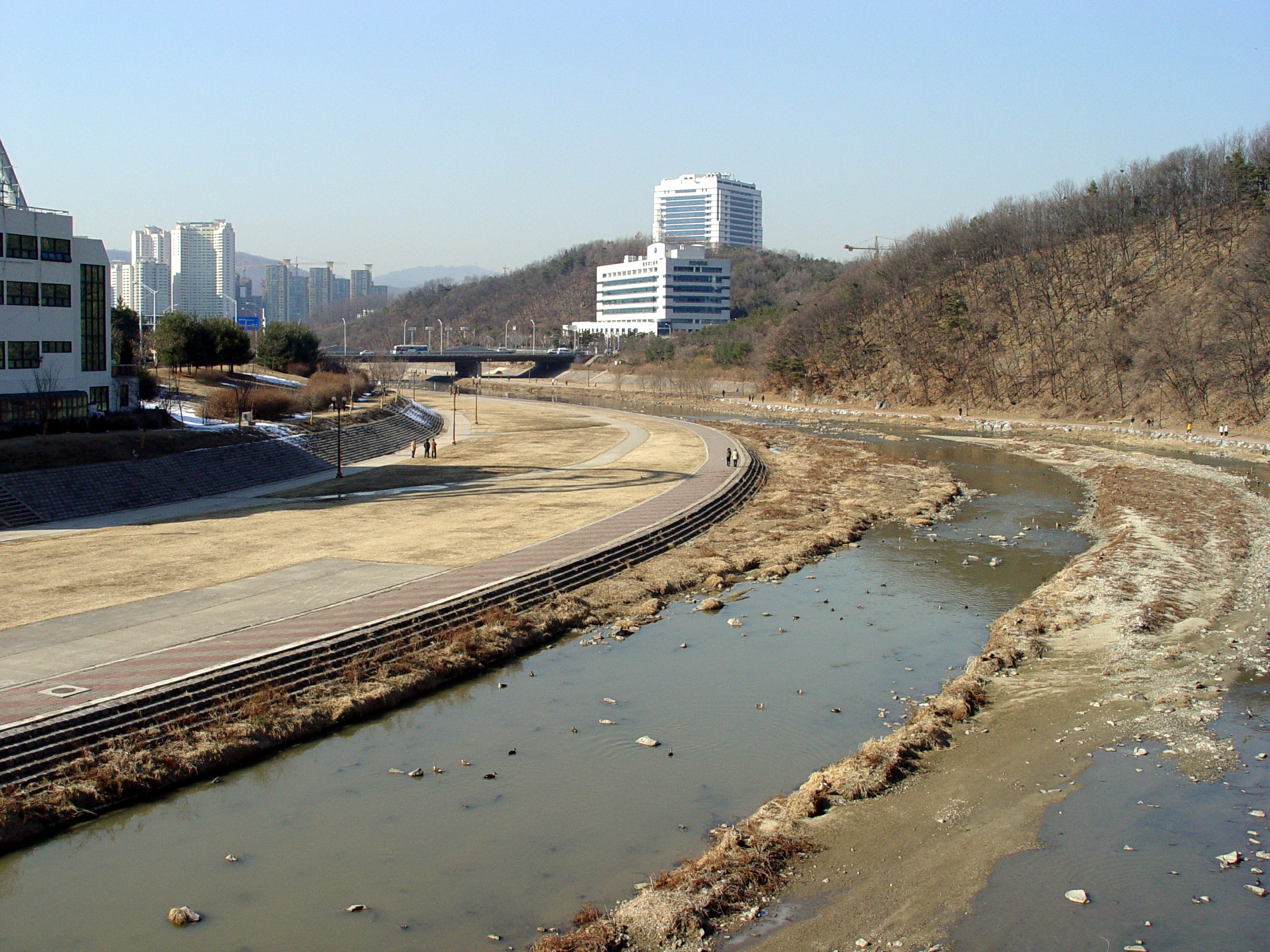
Tancheon

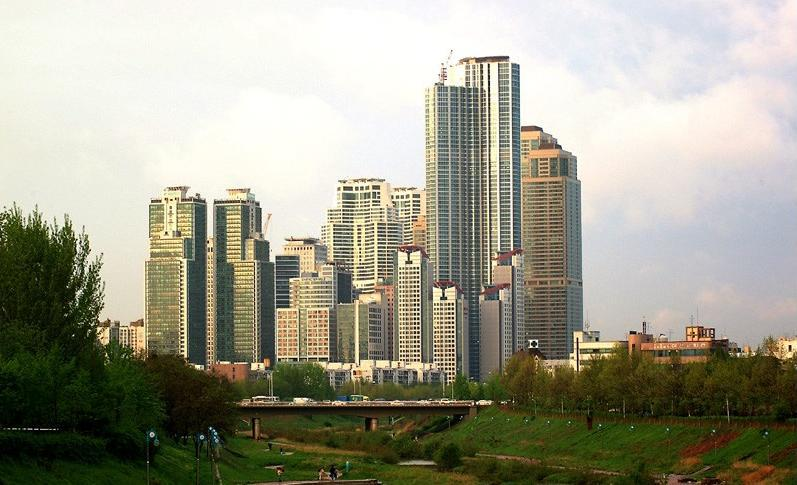
View of Yangjaecheon

- Gongneungcheon (곡능천)
- Najinhacheon (나진하천)
- Changneungcheon
- Anyangcheon
  - Dorimcheon
- Jungnangcheon
  - Cheonggyecheon
- Tancheon
  - Yangjaecheon
  - Yeosucheon
  - Bundangcheon
  - Pungdeokcheon
- Gyeongancheon
  - Neungwoncheon (능원천)
  - Yangjicheon (양지천)
  - Unhakcheon (운학천)
- Bukhan River
  - Munhocheon (문호천)
  - Hongcheongang River (홍천강)
    - Sandaecheon (산대천)
    - Deoksancheon
      - Seongjeoncheon (성전천)
    - Yasidaecheon (야시대천)
  - Gapyeongcheon
  - Soyanggang River (소양강)
  - Sanaecheon (사내천)
    - Yongdamcheon
  - Magunaemeo (마구내머)
    - Mahyeoncheon (마현천)
    - Bongocheon
- Namhangang River (남한강)
  - Sinnaegaeul (신내개울)
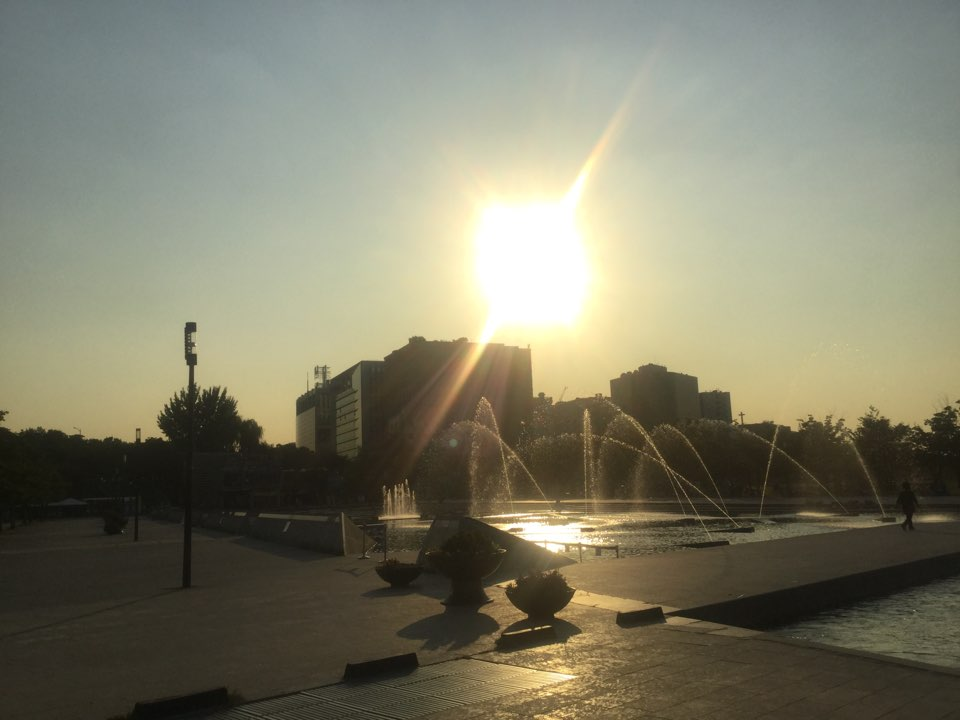
    - View of Han River park
      Heukcheon
  - Yongdamcheon
  - Bokhacheon
    - Jukdangcheon (죽당천)
    - Pyogocheon (표고천)
    - Gwanricheon (관리천)
  - Yanghwacheon
  - Geumdangcheon
  - Cheongmicheon
    - Gyecheon (계천)
      - Ungcheon (웅천)
  - Seomgang River (섬강)
    - Iricheon (이리천)
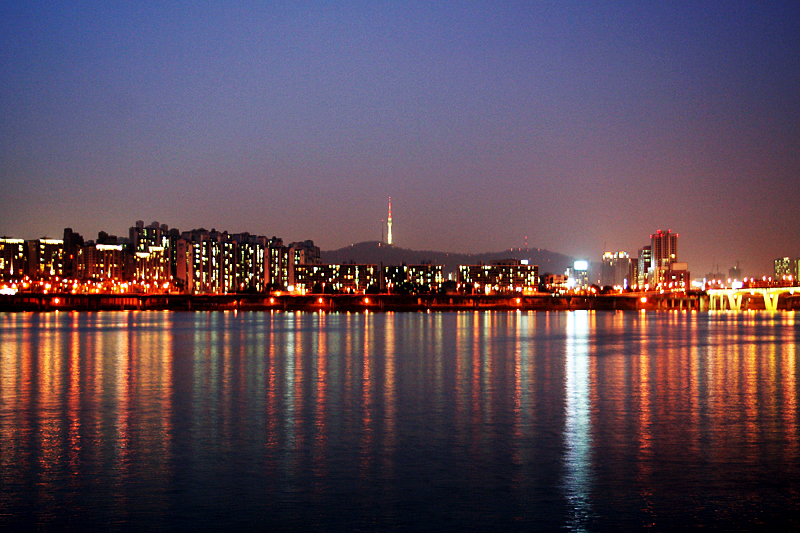
  - Seoul-Han River
    Mokmicheon (목미천)
  - Hwangsancheon (환산천)
  - Guryoncheon (구룡천)
  - Yeongdeokcheon
  - Daejeoncheon
  - Dalcheon
    - Yodocheon
  - Donggang

=== Crossings ===
A total of 31 bridges cross the Han River in Seoul National Capital Area (Seoul, Gyeonggi Province, Incheon), South Korea. They are:

From the west to the east

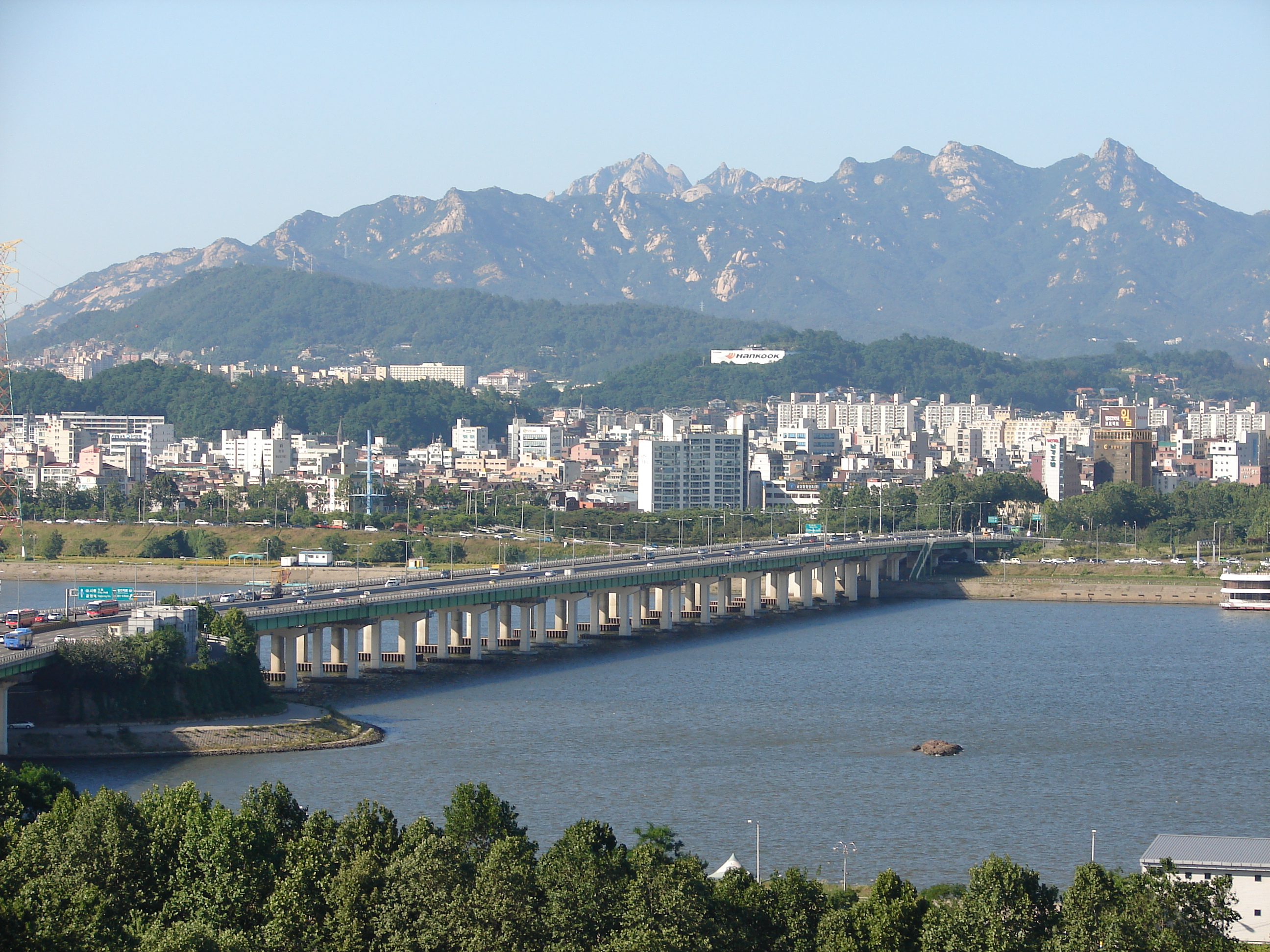
Yanghwa Bridge

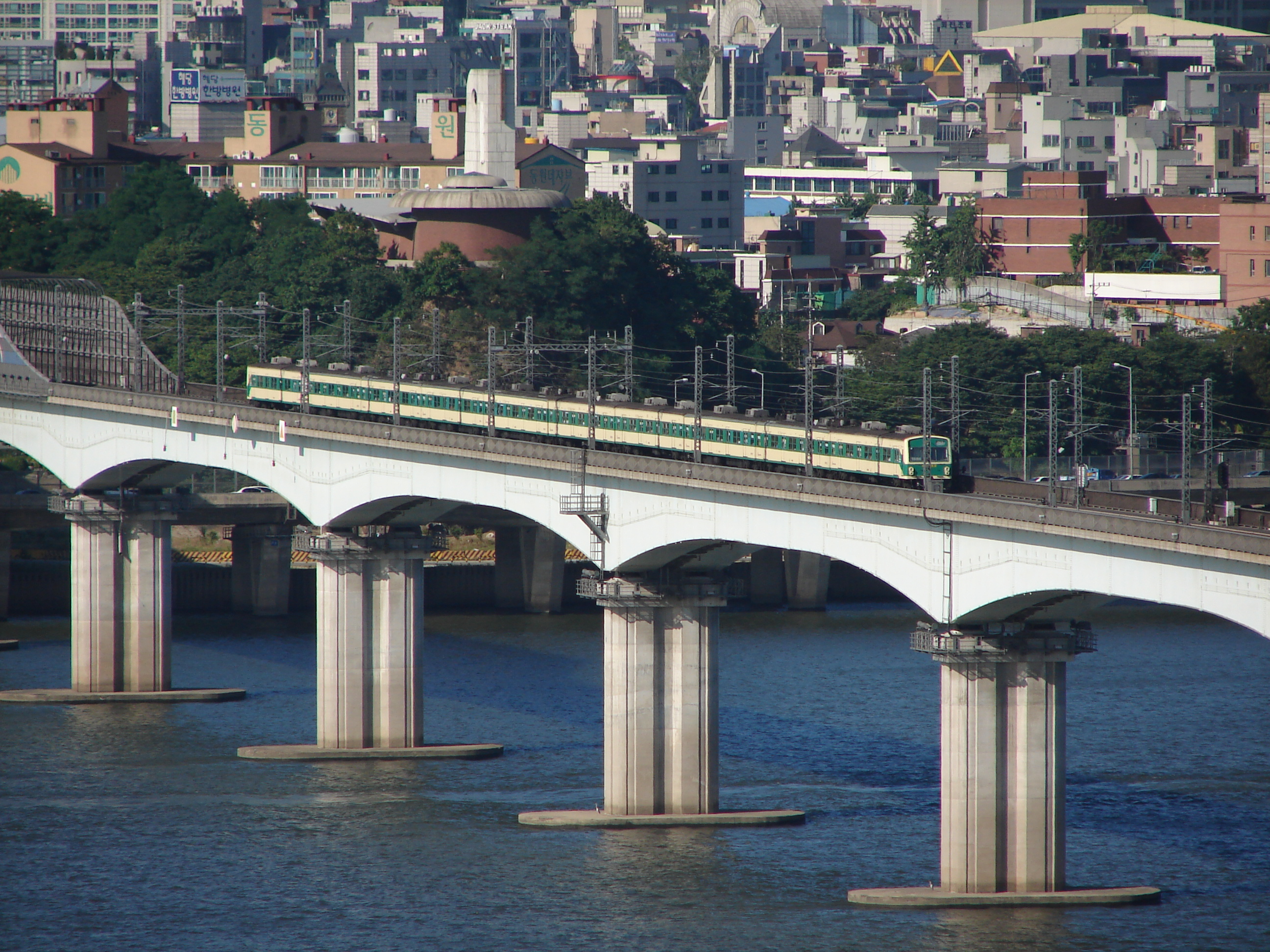
Dangsan Railway Bridge

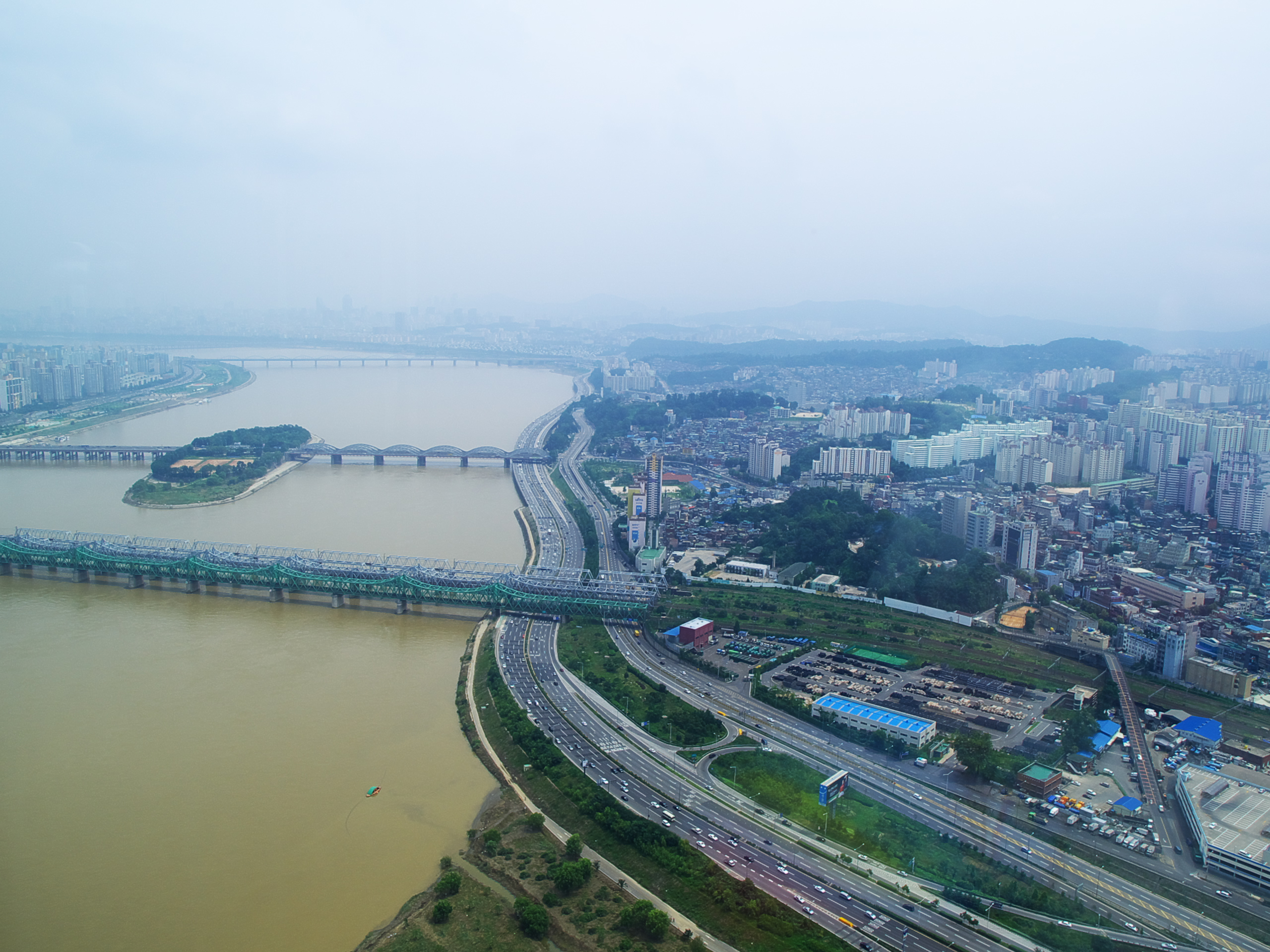
Hangang Railway Bridge and Hangang Bridge

- Ilsan Bridge
- Gimpo Bridge
- Haengju Bridge
- Banghwa Bridge
- Magok Bridge
- Gayang Bridge
- World Cup Bridge
- Seongsan Bridge
- Yanghwa Bridge
- Dangsan Railway Bridge
- Seogang Bridge
- Mapo Bridge
- Wonhyo Bridge
- Hangang Railway Bridge
- Hangang Bridge
- Dongjak Bridge
- Banpo Bridge with Jamsu Bridge
- Hannam Bridge
- Dongho Bridge
- Seongsu Bridge
- Yeongdong Bridge
- Cheongdam Bridge
- Jamsil Bridge
- Jamsil Railway Bridge
- Olympic Bridge
- Cheonho Bridge
- Gwangjin Bridge
- Guri-Amsa Bridge
- Godeok–Topyeong Bridge
- Gangdong Bridge
- Misa Bridge
- Paldang Bridge

There are 11 subway crossings of the river.

- Seoul Subway Line 1 (Yongsan–Noryangjin)
- Seoul Subway Line 2 (Gangbyeon–Jamsillaru; Dangsan–Hapjeong)
- Seoul Subway Line 3 (Oksu–Apgujeong)
- Seoul Subway Line 4 (Ichon–Dongjak)
- Seoul Subway Line 5 (Singil–Yeouido; Yeouinaru–Mapo; Gwangnaru–Cheonho)
- Seoul Subway Line 7 (Jayang–Cheongdam)
- Airport Railroad (Gimpo International Airport–Digital Media City)
- Suin-Bundang Line (Apgujeongrodeo–Seoul Forest)
- Seoul Subway Line 8 (Jangja Lake Park–Amsa History Park)

== See also ==
- List of rivers of Asia
- List of rivers of Korea
- Geography of South Korea
- Miracle on the Han River
- Hangang Park
