= Deoksancheon =

River in South Korea

Deoksancheon (Korean: 덕산천) is a river of South Korea. It is a tributary of the Hongcheon River in the Han River system. The river is located in a high altitude area. There are alluvium deposits along the lower end of the stream.
