= Paldang Bridge =

Bridge in South Korea

Coordinates: 37°32′46.57″N 127°14′16.32″E

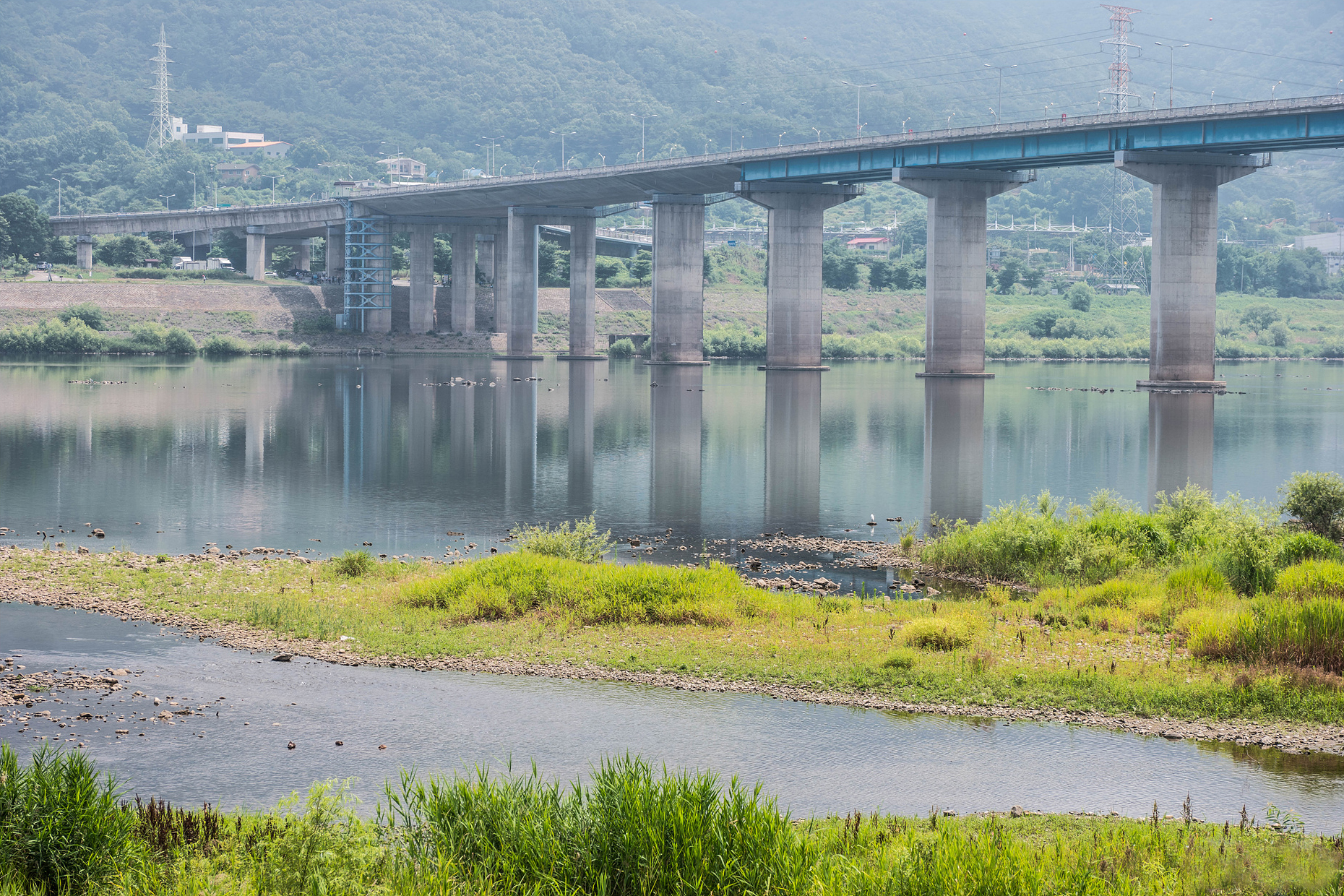

Korean name
- Hangul: 팔당대교
- Hanja: 八堂大橋
- RR: Paldang daegyo
- MR: P'altang taegyo

The Paldang Bridge (Korean: 팔당대교; Korean pronunciation: [pʰalt͈aŋ]) crosses the Han River in South Korea and connects the cities of Hanam and Namyangju. Excluding the single-lane bridge built on top of the Paldang Dam, it is the easternmost bridge on the Han River.

Construction on the bridge began in May 1986 as the second concrete bridge over the Han River after Olympic Bridge. Construction was halted in March 1991, however, when a portion of the bridge collapsed due to strong winds and killed one construction worker on site. Inspections revealed structural damage, prompting a change in construction methods. Construction resumed in October 1991, but was halted again in May 1992 after further structural damage was discovered. Initial designs were scrapped, and the bridge was opened as a girder bridge on April 25, 1995.
