= Dongho Bridge =

Bridge in Seoul, South Korea

Coordinates: 37°32′09″N 127°01′17″E

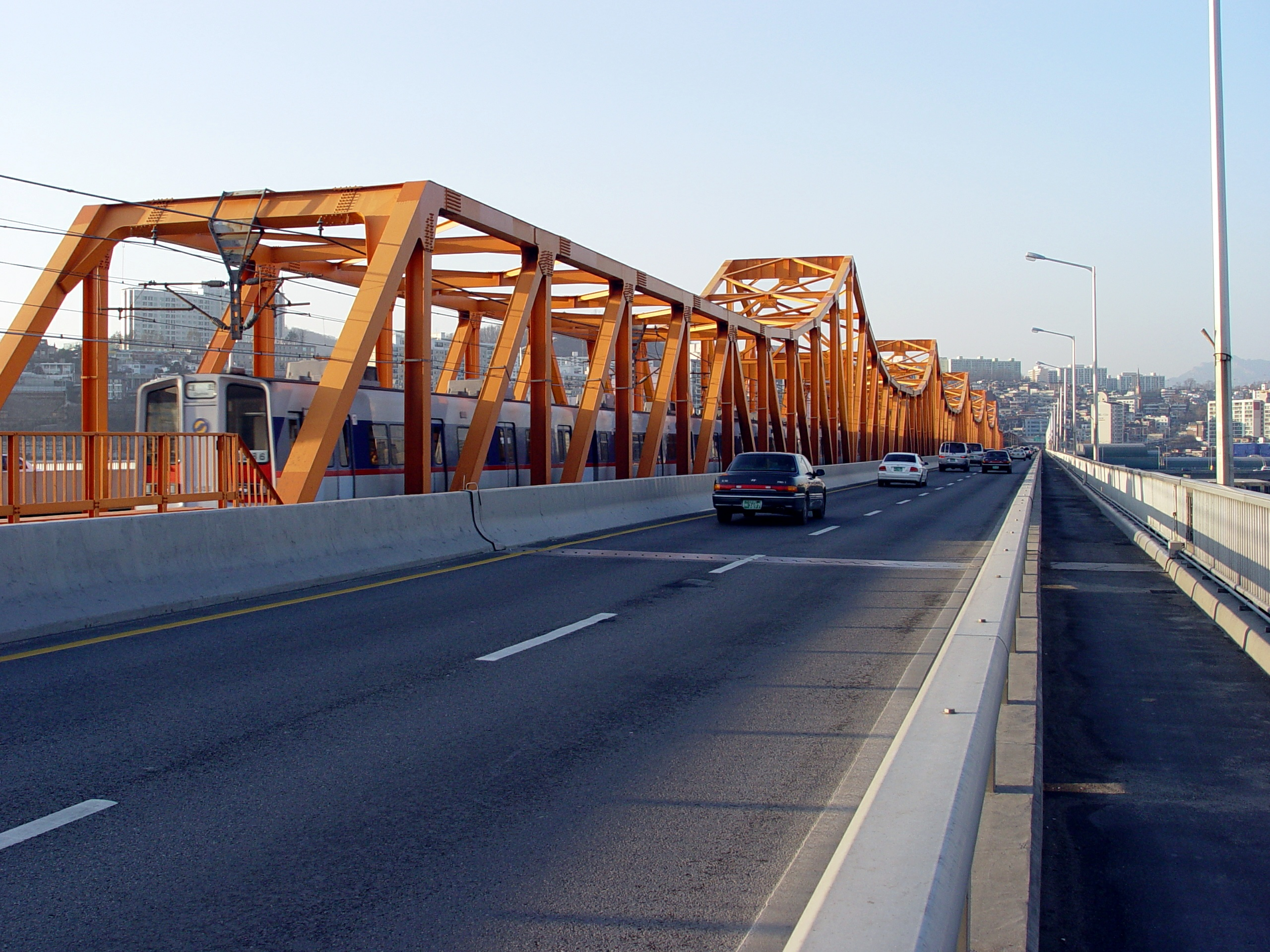
- A train passing over the bridge

Korean name
- Hangul: 동호대교
- Hanja: 東湖大橋
- RR: Dongho daegyo
- MR: Tongho taegyo

Dongho Bridge (Korean: 동호대교) is a bridge over the Han River in Seoul, South Korea. It carries road traffic and Seoul Subway Line 3. Oksu station is located at the northern end of this bridge.

The bridge has CCTV cameras installed at intervals of 80 to 110 meters. It is believed to be the bridge over the Han River with the fewest number of suicide attempts, because it is inaccessible to public transportation and because there is a high likelihood of falling to death while climbing it.
