= Bokhacheon =

Watercourse in South Korea

Bokhacheon (Korean: 복하천) is a river of South Korea. It is a river of the Han River system.
