= Ara Canal =

Canal in South Korea

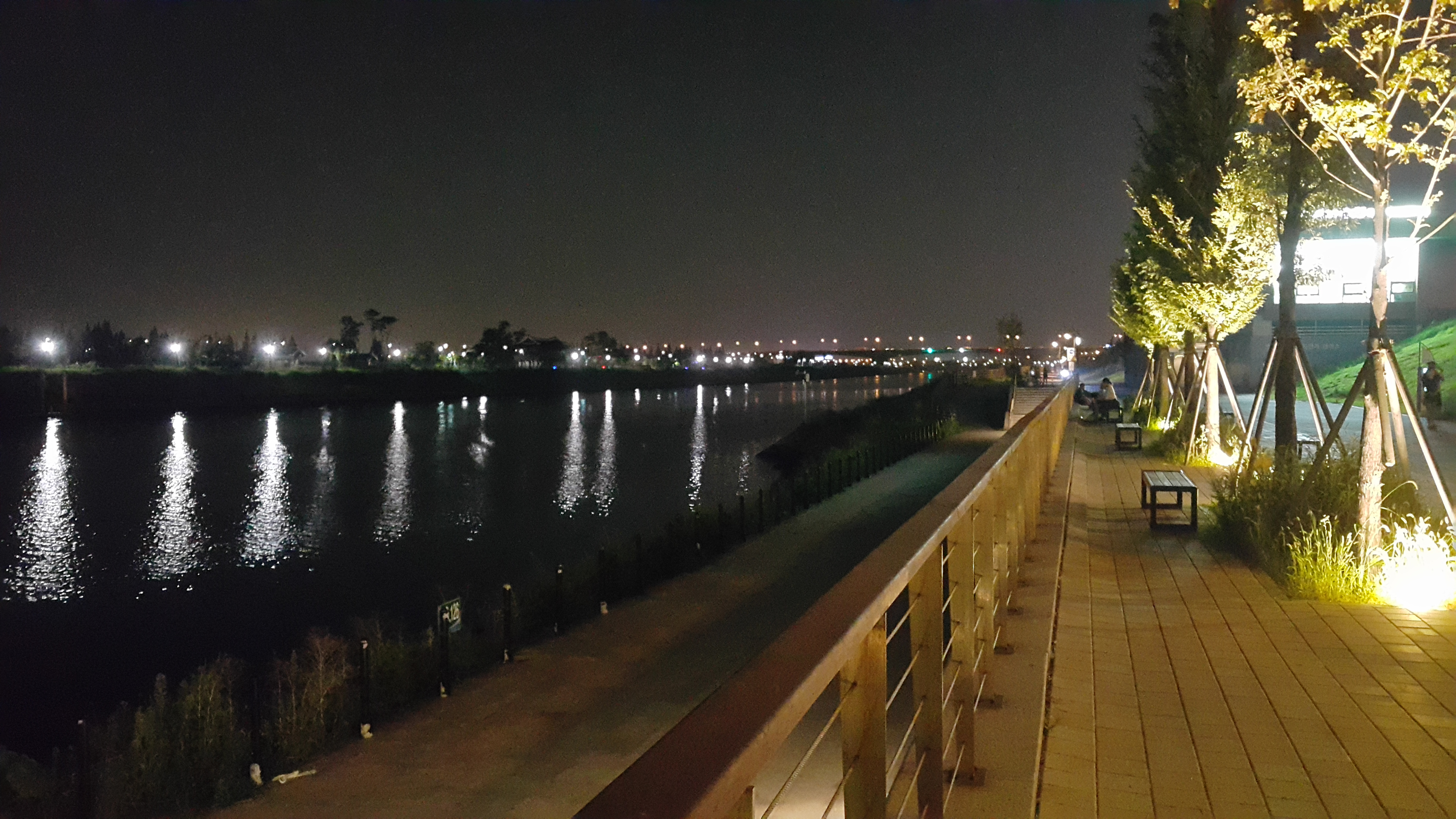
- Part of the bike path
- Interactive map of Ara Canal
- Country: South Korea

Specifications
- Length: 18 km (11 miles)
- Locks: West Sea Locks: 2 locks 210 × 28.5 m, 1 recreational lock 35 × 14.5 m; Han river lock 150 × 22 m

History
- Original owner: Korea Water Resources Corporation
- Construction began: March 2009
- Date completed: 25 May 2012

Geography
- Start point: Geomdan District, Incheon
- End point: Gangseo District, Seoul
- Beginning coordinates: 37.5606°N 126.6017°E
- Ending coordinates: 37.599°N 126.7973°E

The Ara Canal or Gyeongin Ara Waterway (Korean: 경인 아라뱃길) is a canal in South Korea linking the Han River to the Yellow Sea, bypassing the Korean Demilitarized Zone that the river's estuary lies in. It extends from the Geomdan-gu district in Incheon to the Gangseo-gu district in Seoul. The canal was built to control flooding, improve shipping logistics, and provide recreational opportunities.

== History ==
During the Goryeo period, Choe I, the son of Ch'oe Ch'ung-hŏn, attempted to construct a canal close to the present-day canal site, but the project was not technologically feasible. Injong, a king in the Joseon dynasty, also unsuccessfully attempted to construct the canal.

The modern "Gulpocheon River Waterproof Road" project began in 1992 and sought to address issues with irregular flows and flooding, such as a flood in the summer of 1987 which affected approximately 6,000 residents of the Incheon area. To address the issue, a project to floodproof the river was undertaken, starting with a five-year survey.

In 1995, several scenarios for the Gulpocheon Waterproof Road project were proposed. One proposal was to dig the waterway to discharge water into the Yellow Sea. Another proposal was that the municipality of Gimpo would maintain a reservoir. Though the latter idea was more economical, the former was selected to boost Korea's economy. The Gyeongin Ara Canal project plan was developed, and after discussions, Hyundai Engineering & Construction was selected as the main contractor in 1995. However, construction was delayed until 2009 due to several controversies. The project was eventually completed in 2012.

== Project summary ==
| Division | Contents |
|---|---|
| Project Section | Incheon Seo-gu Sicheon-dong – Seoul Gangseo-gu Gaehwa-dong |
| Facilities Plan | Main Canal: Total Length of 18 km (Width: 80 m, Depth: 6.3m) Incheon terminal: 244 million m^{2}, 2 lock doors Gimpo terminal: 187 million m^{2}, 2 lock doors Back complex: Incheon terminal back complex, Gimpo terminal back complex |
| Total cost | ₩1.6 trillion (about US$1.4 billion at May 2012 exchange rates) |
| Project period | 2009–2012 |

== Controversies ==
Planning and development of the Ara Canal was controversial due to distorted cost-benefit estimations. It began in 1995, when, due to economic and environmental concerns, public opinion turned against the project. In response, eight reports were produced to demonstrate the project's validity. A cost–benefit analysis of the canal by the Korea Water Resources Corporation reported a score of 2.08 in 1989, and later 2.2 in 1996. These high-benefit estimations were made under the assumption that the then-present economic boom in South Korea would continue. However, following the Korean IMF crisis in the late 1990s, the project was abandoned.

After the IMF crisis passed in 2002, the Ministry of Construction and Transportation commissioned the Korea Development Institute (KDI) to report on the economic feasibility of the canal. This time, the project received scores below 1.0 (0.81, and upon reanalysis, 0.92). This indicated the project's costs outweighed its benefits. However, the Ministry rejected these two reports and demanded a third reanalysis. The KDI resubmitted the report, this time with scores near or above 1.0 (0.92–1.28), but academics suspected that the Ministry's relentless requests for reanalysis forced the KDI to inflate the score, similar to confirmation bias.

In August 2004, the Ministry commissioned an independent report from Dehabe, a Dutch canal consulting company, and received a cost-benefit score of 1.76 in March 2007. In 2008, the KDI re-verified Dehabe's report with a score of 1.06. The report predicted the goods transported in 2011 would be 294,000 TEU of containers, 6.3 million tons of sea sand, 500,000 tons of steel, and 600,000 passengers. However, it was speculated that these estimations of the canal's benefits were inflated, making the project seem more cost-effective. As evidence, the KDI's cost-analysis excluded an already-constructed spillway, claiming it was part of a different project. An opposition member of the National Assembly observed that if this was true, the spillway would have been constructed at half the size, and suggested that the analysis had been purposefully misleading in order to drive business. A year after the canal opened, the volume of goods transported via the canal was just over 5% of this estimated demand.

Controversy again resurfaced in the summer of 2010, when heavy rain caused extensive damage near the Ara Canal. Environmental groups insisted that the canal did not have the intended effect on flood prevention. These groups also argued that the canal had no plan to build preventative infrastructure—such as rainwater pumping stations, backflow prevention facilities, and rainwater pipes—and demanded that the project be reexamined. The Korea Water Resource Corporation responded that there would have been greater damage if the Ara Canal did not exist and argued that the damage was instead caused by insufficient sewage pipe capacity. Furthermore, they suggested that the canal helped prevent greater damage by discharging rainwater into the Yellow Sea, thereby preventing floods. As a result, they argued that installing the requested infrastructure was not necessary.

== Usage ==
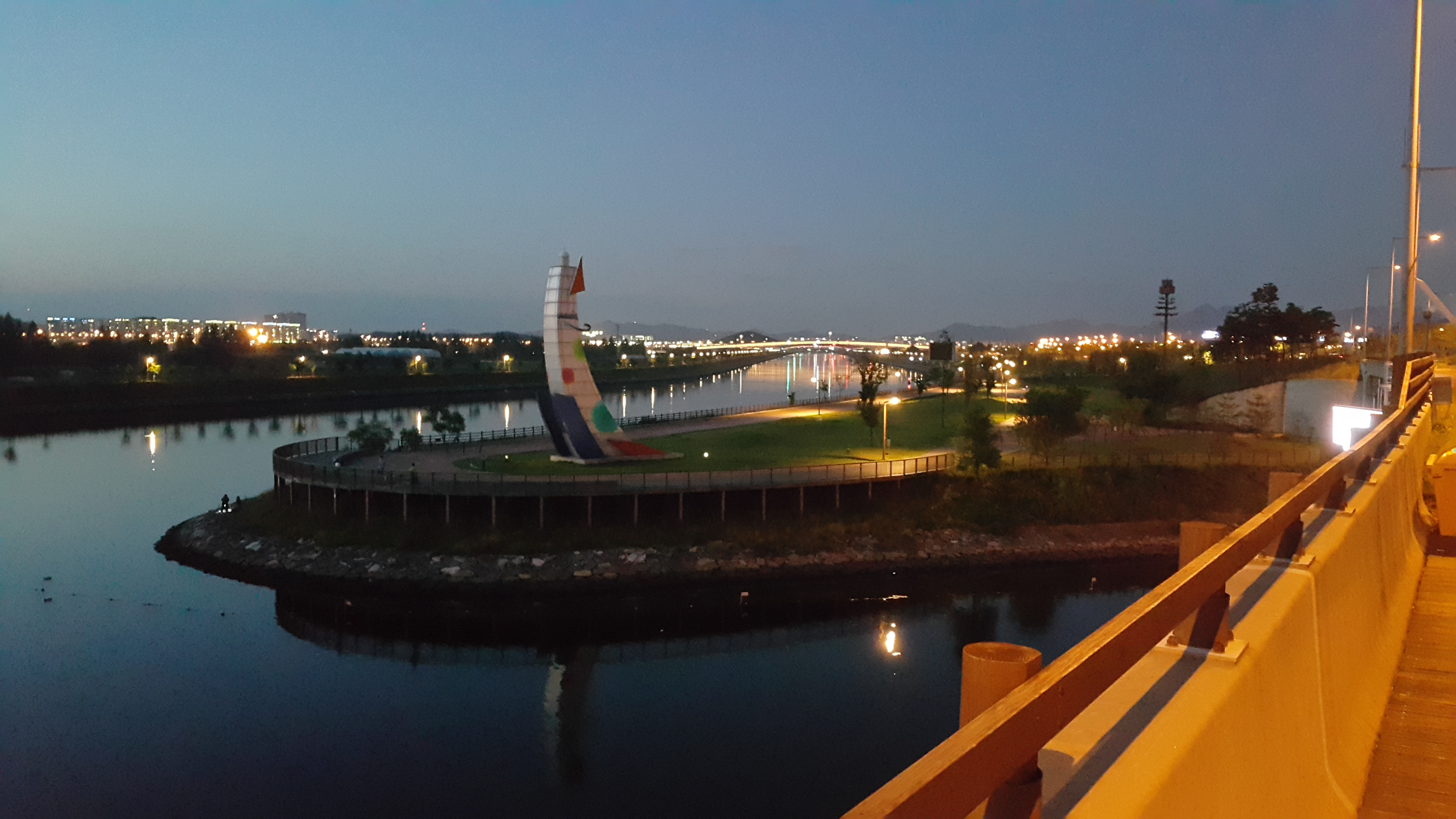
One of the parks on Ara Canal

=== Eight Views of Suhyang ===
There are Eight Views of Suhyang from the Ara Canal. These include "The Yellow Sea", "Ara Incheon Passenger Terminal", "Sicheon Riverside", "Ara Waterfall", "Suhyangwon", "Duri Eco Park", "Ara Gimpo Passenger Terminal", and "Ara Hangang Waterside".

=== Recreation ===
Next to the Ara Canal is a 41.3 km bicycle path. There are five bicycle rental shops along the Ara Canal, including in the Ara Incheon passenger terminal, by the southern Sicheon bridge, the northern Gyeyang bridge, the southern Gyeyang bridge, and within the Ara Gimpo passenger terminal.

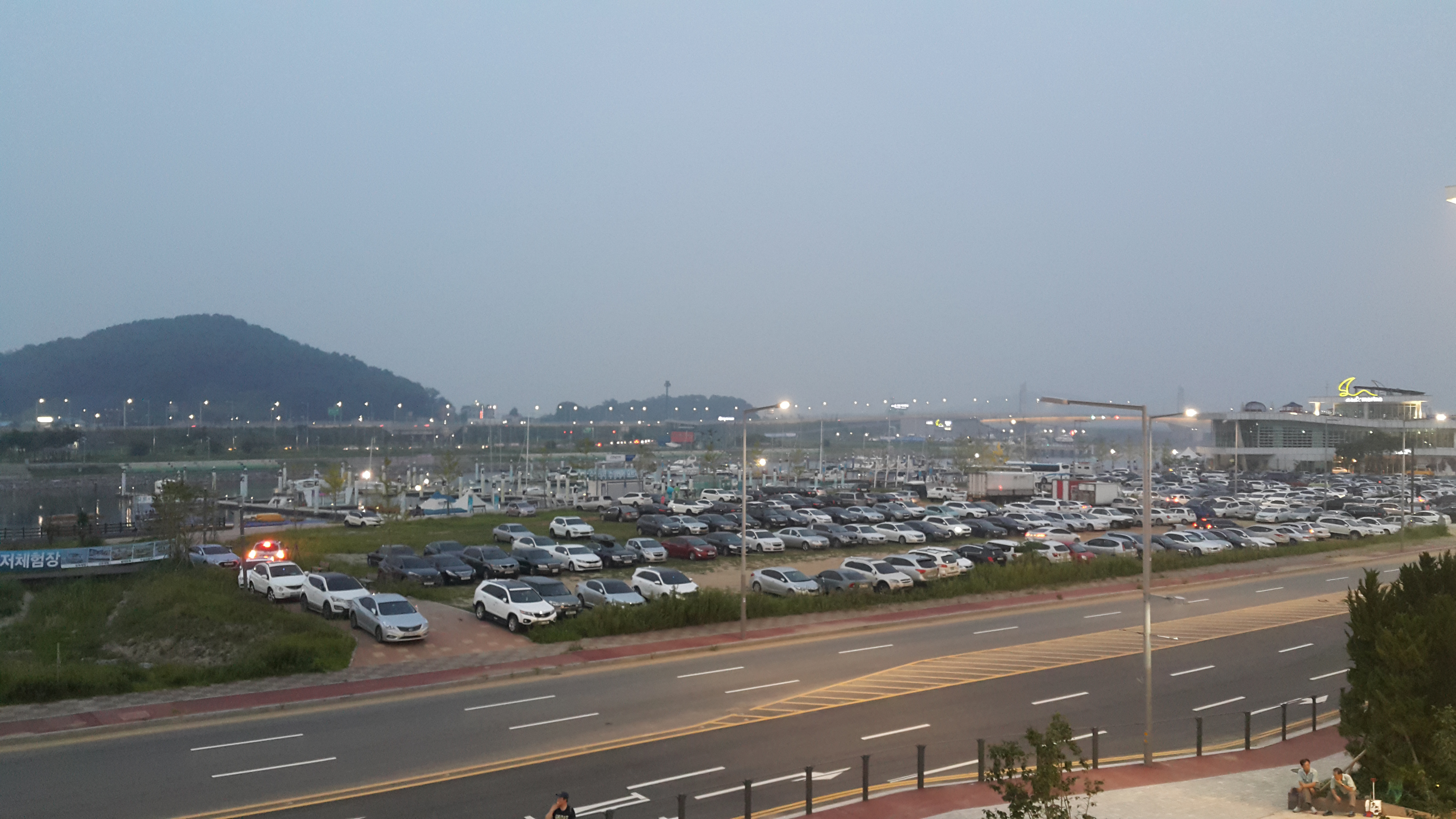
Marina port

There are three marine facilities in the Ara Marina region. The yacht mooring facility accommodates 199 ships (water: 136, dry-dock: 58). The marina support facility contains a ship gas station, ship repair shop, crane, inclined plane, washing room, and sewage disposal. The Ara Marine Center also contains a convention center, wedding hall, and restaurant. The Gimpo Mayor Yacht contest is held annually in late May.

=== Cultural life ===
The Gyeongin Ara Culture Festival is a nine-day festival first held in October 2013. The festival's program has changed every year, with programs divided by region.

A shopping mall opened in the area in February 2015. It is the largest shopping mall in the Ara Canal region.
