= Geumdangcheon =

Watercourse in South Korea

Geumdangcheon (Korean: 금당천) is a river of South Korea. It is a river of the Han River system. The stream flows north–south.
