= Arisu =

Tap water in South Korea

Korean name
- Hangul: 아리수
- Hanja: 아리水
- RR: Arisu
- MR: Arisu

Arisu is the current name of the tap water in Seoul, South Korea.

== Name ==
Arisu was named in 2004, the former name for Han River in ancient Goguryeo, with the combination of 'Ari,' which means 'big' in Korean, and 'Su,' meaning, 'water.' It is also the name of the water treatment plant located in Seoul, South Korea.

== Quality and supply ==
=== Water source management ===
Because Arisu is supplied to all areas of the city of Seoul, it is very strictly administered by the water treatment plant. The Seoul Metropolitan Government engages in 24-hour real-time protection and surveillance of the water source to deliver clean and safe tap water. Regular assessments are made of 41 different indicators at 33 water source points and 135 indicators at the six water intake points. Seven indicators, including algae (chlorophyll-a) and phenol, are especially monitored automatically around the clock. The Guui plant operates a biological early warning system using water fleas in addition to installing barriers to block oil from flowing into the water source. It is being served to more than ten million people living in Seoul and the metropolitan region of South Korea. Households with low-income are provided with 21 million bottles of Arisu.

=== Water purification system ===
The Office of Waterworks Seoul Metropolitan Government Starting with the Yeongdeungpo Purification Plant in 2010, Seoul Metropolitan Government will augment the current average purification treatment method with the new ozone and granular activated carbon (or charcoal) system and expand this new advanced system to six water purification centers by 2015. The Advanced Water Purification System is a significantly more advanced water purification process when compared to previous water purification systems, and can eliminate the unpleasant taste from poor water quality and microbial elements such as residual antibiotics.

=== Seoul Water-Now system ===
Seoul Water-Now System is an automatic supervisional system of Arisu. It started in 2004, to prevent water contamination. It checks all the process of producing and supplying Arisu. Total of 156 places are checking its quality.

Total	Water intake stations	Filtration plant (water transport)	Water distribution system	Water pressurization system	Water tap
156 places	6 places	6 places	70 places	12 places	62 places

The Office of Waterworks Seoul Metropolitan Government won the United Nations Public Service Awards in 2009 for the system.
