= Dalcheon =

River in South Korea

Coordinates: 36°59′N 127°53′E

Dalcheon (Korean: 달천) is a river of South Korea. It is a river of the Han River system. A tributary of the Namhan River, it is one of the few Namhan tributaries that are navigable year round.
