= Yeosucheon =

Watercourse in South Korea

Yeosucheon (Korean: 여수천) is a river of South Korea. It is a tributary of the Han River.
