= Seom River =

River in South Korea

Seom River (Korean: 섬강) is a river of South Korea. It is a river of the Han River system.
