= Sanaecheon =

Watercourse in South Korea

Sanaecheon (Korean: 사내천) is a river of South Korea. It is part of the Han River system.
