= Heukcheon =

River in South Korea

Heukcheon (Korean: 흑천) is a river of South Korea. It is a river of the Han River system and is a tributary of the Namhan River. The basin area is 314.02 km 2 and the total length is 37 km. Topographically, black forests are the largest part of the watershed with 73.92% and the agricultural area is 7.17%. The upper part of the river consists of gravel, pumice stone and rock. The river is highly affected by nonpoint pollution sources.
