= Yeongdeokcheon =

River in South Korea

Yeongdeokcheon (Korean: 영덕천) is a river of South Korea. It is a river of the Han River system.
