= Bongocheon =

River in North Korea

Bongocheon is a river of North Korea. It is a river of the Han River system.
