= Yodocheon =

Yodocheon Yodo-nae, Yodo-ch'ŏn, Hyodo-ch'ŏn
- Location in South Korea
- Native name: 요도천 (Korean)

Location
- Country: South Korea
- Lalawigan: North Chungcheong Province

Yodocheon (Korean: 요도천) is a river of South Korea. It is a river of the Han River system. The Yodocheon located in the province of North Chungcheong Province, in the central part of the country, 100 km south-east of the capital city Seoul.
