= Misa Bridge =

Bridge in South Korea

Coordinates: 37°35′11.04″N 127°11′56.43″E

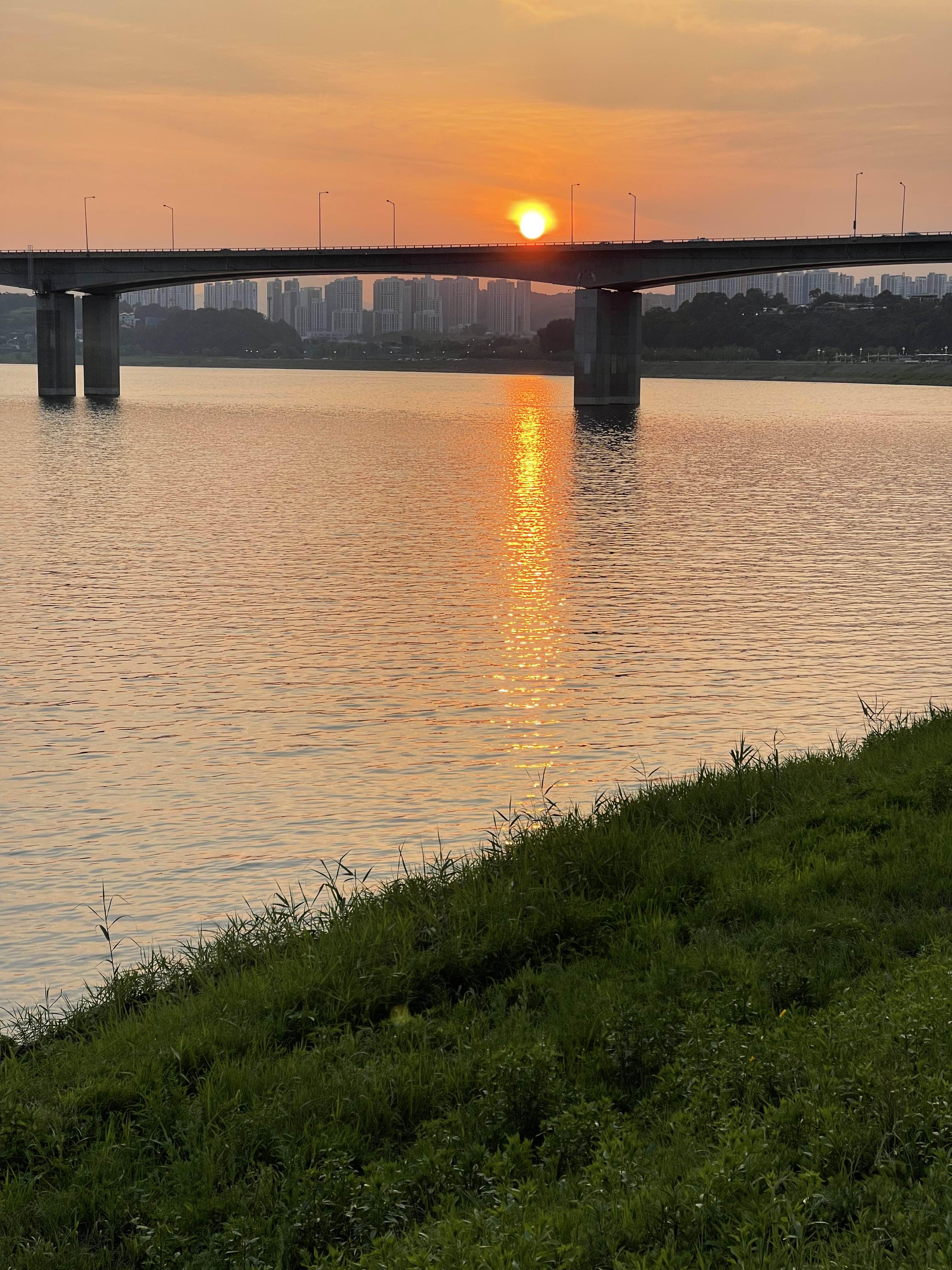

Korean name
- Hangul: 미사대교
- Hanja: 渼沙大橋
- RR: Misa daegyo
- MR: Misa taegyo

The Misa Bridge crosses the Han River in South Korea and connects the cities of Hanam and Namyangju. It is part of the Seoul-Chuncheon Expressway.
