= Yongdamcheon =

Location
- Country: South Korea

Basin features
- River system: Han River

Yongdamcheon (Korean: 용담천) is a river of South Korea. It is a river of the Han River system. According to legend, an evil monster lived in the stream that terrorized the local citizens. Once the Yongdamsa Temple was built by Doseon, the monster stopped its attacks.
