= Cheongmicheon =

River in South Korea

Coordinates: 37°13′N 127°44′E

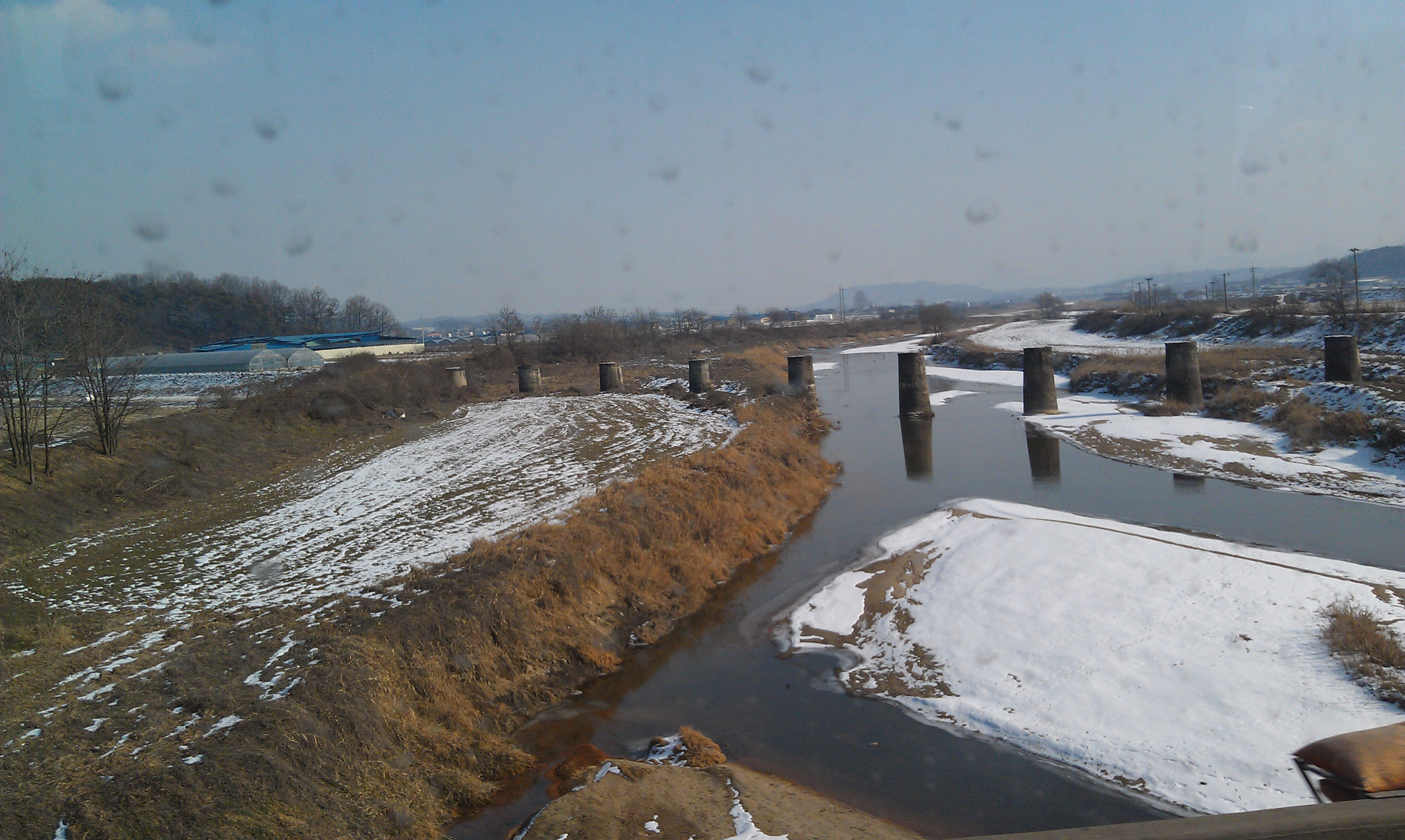

Cheongmicheon (Korean: 청미천) is a river of South Korea. It is a river of the Han River system.
