= Gyeongancheon =

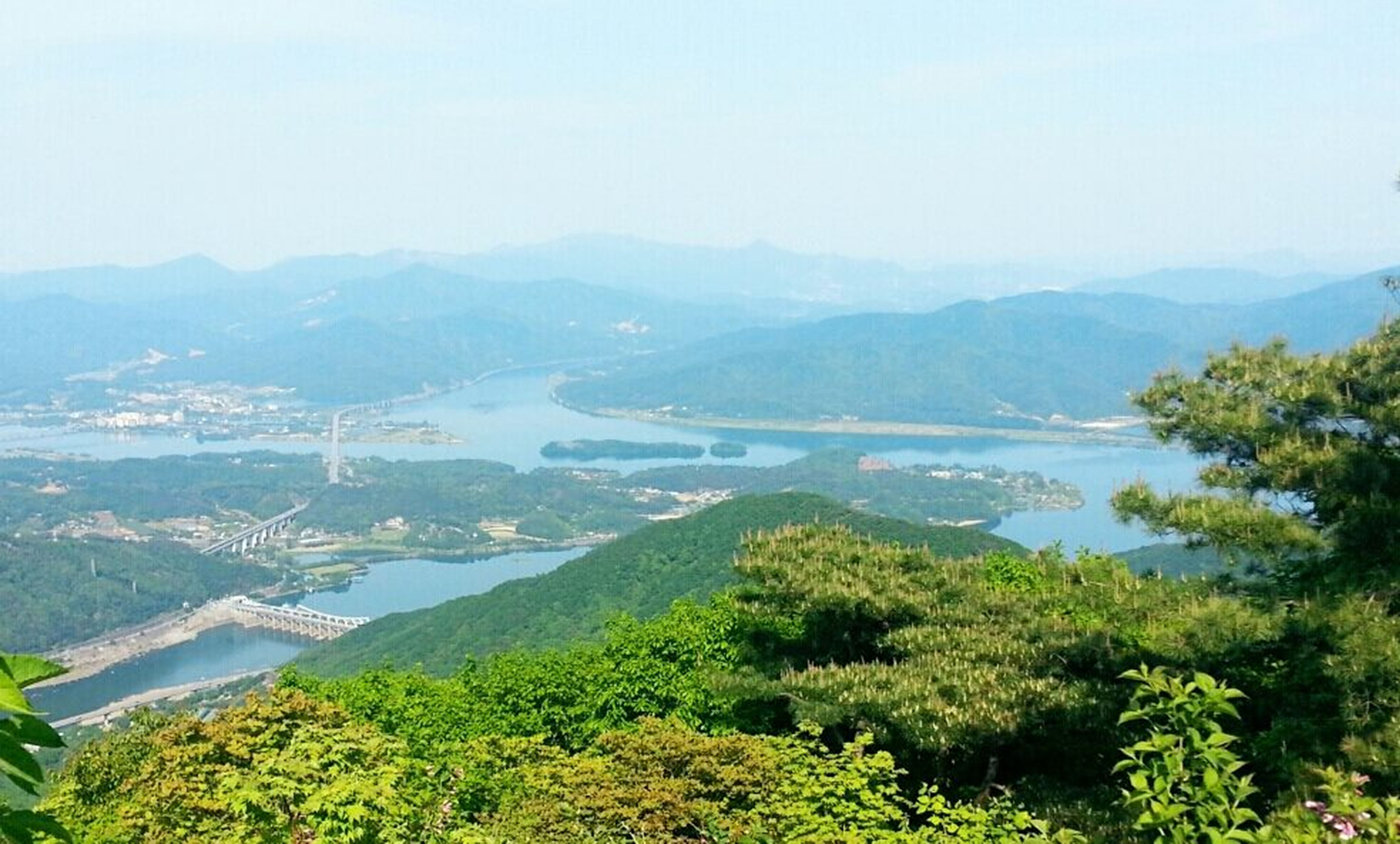
- Native name: Korean: 경안천; Hanja: 京An川

Location
- Country: South Korea

Physical characteristics
- Mouth: Han River

Basin features
- Progression: Han River -> Yellow Sea
- River system: Han River system

Gyeongancheon (Korean: 경안천) is a river of South Korea, tributary of the Han River. It has been studied for future potential climate, land use change and vegetation cover.

== Course ==
Gyeongancheon rises on Munsubong (404 m (1,325 ft)) in Hodong, Yongin, Gyeonggi Province. It flows north through Yongin, where it is joined by the Geumhakcheon in Gimnyangjang-dong, receives the Neungwoncheon at Ilsan-ri in Mohyeon-eup, and is joined by the Gonjiamcheon at Jiwol-ri in Gwangju before emptying into Paldang Lake. The river is 49.5 km (30.8 mi) long and drains a basin of 558.2 km^{2} (215.5 sq mi), which includes two national rivers and 77 local rivers. Its valley is bounded on the west by Cheongnyangsan, Geomdansan and Munhyeongsan, and on the east by Haehyeopsan, Mugapsan and Taehwasan. The Yangbeol weir, Jungang reservoir and Seoha pumping station along its course supply water for agriculture.
