= Daedeoksan (North Gyeongsang and North Jeolla) =

Mountain in South Korea

Highest point
- Elevation: 1,290 m (4,230 ft)

Geography
- Location: North Jeolla Province, South Korea

Daedeoksan (Korean: 대덕산) is a mountain of North Jeolla Province, western South Korea. It has an elevation of 1,290 metres.

== See also ==
- List of mountains of Korea
