= Hangang Bus =

Ferry service in Seoul, South Korea

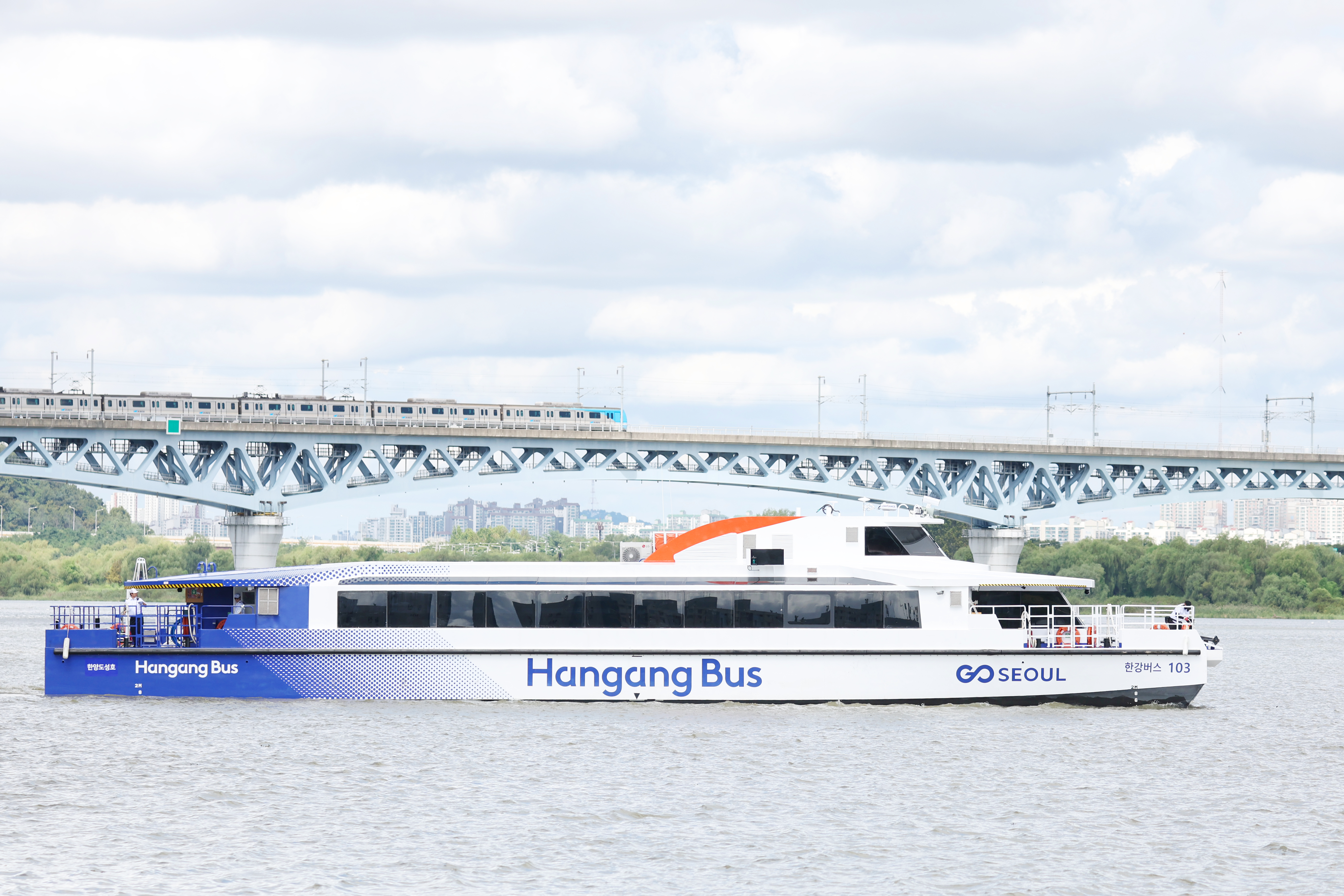
- Locale: Seoul
- Waterway: Han River
- Transit type: Passenger ferry
- Began operation: September 18, 2025; 13 months ago
- System length: 31.5 km (17.0 nmi; 19.6 mi)
- No. of lines: 1
- No. of vessels: 12
- No. of terminals: 7

The Hangang Bus (Korean: 한강버스) is a water transportation system that operates on the Han River in Seoul, South Korea. It connects seven piers, from Magok to Jamsil, and runs 31.5 kilometres (17.0 nmi; 19.6 mi). Service began on September 18, 2025, but was temporarily suspended ten days later, reopening on November 1. It is eventually planned to operate both regular and express routes.

== History ==
The idea for the Hangang Bus came from Seoul Mayor Oh Se-hoon, who had been inspired by ferries on London's River Thames. On December 28, 2023, the Seoul Metropolitan Government and E-Cruise signed an agreement regarding the operation of the Hangang Bus. The Han River Bus Corporation was established on June 26, 2024. A trial run was conducted starting in July 2025.

The line opened on September 18, 2025. Initially, it operated with reduced service frequencies, since only four of the proposed twelve vessels were in service. In its first ten days, the Hangang Bus had around 25,000 passengers. The Hangang Bus faced criticism over its ₩150 billion (US$105 million) cost, which far exceeded the original cost estimate, as well as a series of incidents that occurred following the start of service. In the first ten days of the Hangang Bus's opening, vessels were forced to stop operating on three occasions. The express line was scheduled to open on October 10, corresponding with the Chuseok holiday, with regular service frequencies being implemented on that date. Due to repeated technical issues and complaints over its speed, the Seoul Metropolitan Government announced on September 28 that regular service would be suspended for a month. The ferries were to undergo testing during that time.

Operations resumed on November 1, and the route recorded 10,000 passengers in the next three days. When the Hangang Bus resumed, service frequencies were increased, and ferry service operated for a longer period during the day; in addition, two ferryboats were made available for each departure time so that, in case one vessel broke down, the other could provide backup service. It faced criticism for being slower than the Seoul Metropolitan Subway and for making announcements only in Korean.

== Service ==
The Hangang Bus is a ferry connecting Magok, Gangseo and Jamsil, Songpa along the Han River (Korean: 한강; RR: hangang), aiming to capture both commuter and tourist demand. It is operated by Hangang Bus Co., Ltd., a joint venture between the Seoul Housing and Urban Development Corporation and E-Cruise, an affiliate of E-Land Group that operates Hangang cruise ships. The Hangang Bus passes through seven piers: Magok, Mangwon, Yeouido, Apgujeong, Oksu, Ttukseom, and Jamsil. When the express route begins, it will run during peak hours, stopping only at Magok, Yeouido, and Jamsil.

As of 2025, the Hangang Bus runs between 06:30 and 22:30 on weekdays (at 15-minute intervals during peak times, and 30-minute intervals at other times) and between 09:30 and 22:30 on weekends. The actual schedule may be adjusted depending on vessel availability and demand.

Before the Hangang Bus opened, commute times from Jamsil to Yeouido averaged 80 minutes, and commute times from Jamsil to Magok averaged 127 minutes. The total travel time on the local route was supposed to be 75 minutes, while the travel time on the express route was supposed to be 54 minutes. However, the vessels' speeds are limited by the shallowness of the Han River. As a result, the local route's travel time is 127 minutes and the express route's travel time is 80 minutes. The Board of Audit and Inspection found in 2026 that, although the Seoul government had advertised the 54-minute travel time between Magok and Jamsil on the express ferries, this was not physically possible.

== Ferries ==
Vessel		Year of construction	Fuel	Status	Exterior
101	Gyeongbokgung 경복궁호	2025	Hybrid	In use	
102	Hanyangdoseong 한양도성호	2025	Hybrid	In use	
103	Namsan Seoul Tower 남산서울타워호	2025	Hybrid	In use	

The ferries are named after various Seoul landmarks, such as the palace Gyeongbokgung and N Seoul Tower. The ferries are catamaran-based, approximately 35 metres (115 ft) long, 9.5 metres (31 ft) wide, with a capacity of 199 passengers, and is designed to travel at an average speed of 17 knots (approximately 31.5 km/h). Each vessel includes features such as cafeterias, tables, and wheelchair and bicycle spaces. The vessels will be sequentially delivered, tested, and put into service, with a total of 12 vessels planned; the first two vessels arrived in February 2025.

Of the planned vessels, four will be fully electric and the other eight will be hybrid-electric. The goal is to reduce carbon dioxide emissions by approximately 52% compared to existing diesel ships through hybrid (lithium-ion battery and diesel generator) and electric propulsion configurations. Six are to be manufactured by Eunseong Heavy Industries, two by Gadeok Heavy Industries, and four by Sungjin Engineering. Originally, Gadeok was supposed to build six of the vessels, but due to delays, four of these vessels were reassigned to Sungjin.

Before officially beginning operation, Hangang Bus vessels must pass safety and performance inspections by the Korea Maritime Safety Authority, and only those that have received approval may be delivered.

== Fares and connections ==
The one-way fare of ₩3,000 can be paid for using T-money or a Korean contactless card. Holders of monthly Climate Card transit passes can also take unlimited rides on the Hangang Bus for an additional fee of ₩5,000. To improve accessibility to the piers, free shuttle buses run between Magok, Jamsil, and Apgujeong piers and nearby Seoul Metropolitan Subway stations, and bus routes were added or rerouted. Furthermore, Ddareungi bicycle-share racks were added to the piers.
