= Daedeoksan (Samcheok and Taebaek) =

Mountain in Gangwon-do in South Korea

Coordinates: 37°07′55″N 128°33′36″E

Highest point
- Elevation: 1,307 m (4,288 ft)

Geography
- Location: South Korea

Korean name
- Hangul: 대덕산
- Hanja: 大德山
- RR: Daedeoksan
- MR: Taedŏksan

Daedeoksan (Korean: 대덕산) is a mountain in the cities of Taebaek and Samcheok, Gangwon Province, South Korea. It has an elevation of 1,307 m (4,288 ft).

== See also ==
- List of mountains in Korea
