= First Battle of Seoul =

1950 invasion of Seoul by North Korean forces during the Korean War

- Part of the Korean War
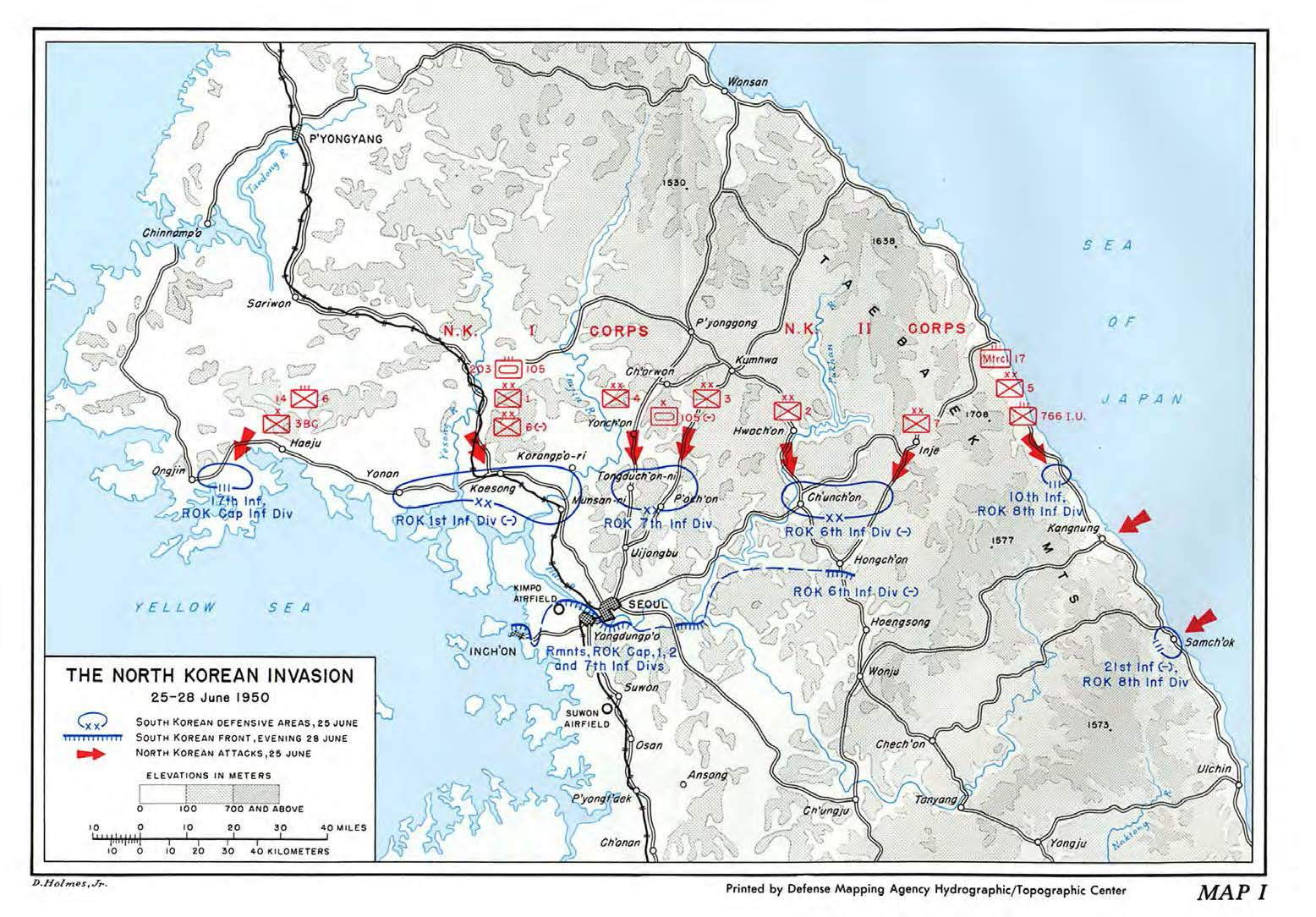
- Map of the North Korean Invasion, 25–28 June 1950
Date	25 June 1950 – 28 June 1950 (3 days)
Location	Seoul, South Korea
Result	North Korean victory: North Korean forces capture Seoul

Belligerents
South Korea	North Korea

Commanders and leaders
Syngman Rhee; Chae Byeong-deok †	Kim Il Sung; Kim Chaek

Strength
65,000	107,000

Casualties and losses
44,000 dead or missing	1,112 dead

The First Battle of Seoul was one of the early battles of the Korean War. Following the border engagements at the outbreak of the war, it was fought between the Republic of Korea Armed Forces and the Korean People's Army of North Korea from 26 to 28 June 1950 across the central region of South Korea, centering on the city of Seoul.

The battle resulted in the capture of Seoul by the Korean People's Army, while South Korean forces were forced to retreat south of the Han River.

== Background ==
At 3:30 a.m. on 25 June 1950, the Korean War began when the Korean People's Army crossed the 38th Parallel, launching a Blitzkrieg offensive spearheaded by T-34 tanks and supported by artillery fire. During the planning of Operation Pokpung ("Storm"), the North Korean leadership calculated that the fall of Seoul would effectively determine the outcome of the war and bring the conflict to a swift conclusion. With this objective in mind, the Korean People's Army divided its forces into two corps. The 1st Corps served as the main attacking force and launched a full-scale offensive toward Seoul, while the 2nd Corps conducted supporting operations to protect the advance of the 1st Corps. The Republic of Korea had not anticipated a large-scale offensive, and only some units had independently adopted heightened defensive measures. As a result, the Korean People's Army was able to achieve a near-complete surprise attack.

The South Korean military was inferior to the Korean People's Army in nearly every respect, including manpower, equipment, and training. In particular, the Republic of Korea Army possessed few effective anti-tank weapons, and the superiority of North Korean armored forces created widespread fear among South Korean troops, contributing to their withdrawal. Nevertheless, South Korean forces maintained high morale, and in some cases succeeded in destroying North Korean tanks through close-quarters assaults. In addition, many of the frontline defensive units conducted effective defensive operations by making skillful use of river and other natural terrain features as obstacles. As a result, except in the Uijeongbu sector, where no significant natural obstacles existed, South Korean defensive lines did not completely collapse. However, in the Uijeongbu, the Korean People's Army's offensive, supported by the shock effect of its armored units, placed the city of Uijeongbu in an increasingly precarious situation.

== Aftermath ==
=== Munsan–Bongilcheon sector ===
The 1st Infantry Division (South Korea) of the Republic of Korea Army, which was defending the area around Munsan, had lost the railway bridge over the Imjin River after the withdrawal of its 12th Regiment during the Battle of Kaesong–Munsan on 25 June. However, South Korean forces continued to hold their positions near the Imjin River, preventing the Korean People's Army from crossing the river.

==== 26 June ====
Beginning on the afternoon of 25 June, reinforcements started arriving and were committed to battle in succession. The Infantry School Training Battalion was attached to the 11th Regiment, while the Korea Military Academy Training Battalion was assigned to the 13th Regiment, strengthening the main defensive line. The 15th Regiment (consisting of the regimental headquarters and the 3rd Battalion) was attached to the 3rd Battalion of the 20th Regiment and deployed along the Uijeon-ri–Bongilcheon line, which served as the final defensive line. Uijeon-ri is located in present-day Wollong-myeon, Paju, and Bongilcheon is located in present-day Bongilcheon-ri, Jori-eup, Paju. Colonel Paik Sun-yup, commander of the 1st Infantry Division, centered the division's defenses on Route No. 1, the principal avenue of approach. Anticipating the possibility that the main defensive line might be breached, he planned for the forces stationed along the Uijeon-ri line to cover the withdrawal of the frontline units and launch counterattacks.

On 26 June, North Korean tank units appeared on the front facing Papyeongsan in Paju, east of the division's sector. The regiment initially engaged the tanks with 2.36-inch M9 Bazooka, but when these proved ineffective, the troops resorted to close-quarters attacks using improvised explosive charges made from Mortar (weapon) shells and Grenade. Faced with these assaults, the tank unit withdrew, and a subsequent attack by North Korean infantry was also repelled in close combat.

Meanwhile, the 6th Division (North Korea) of the Korean People's Army, which had been attacking west of the 1st Division's sector, began an assault before dawn on 26 June, crossing the Imjin River railway bridge with five tanks leading the advance. The Republic of Korea Army's 11th Regiment resisted the attack, but by around 9:00 a.m., a hill north of Munsan Station had fallen to North Korean forces. As this hill overlooked a key route connecting to Route No. 1, the withdrawal routes of the 11th and 13th Regiments were effectively cut off.

However, after capturing the position, the North Korean forces halted their advance and waited for reinforcements. In response, the commander of the 1st Division immediately ordered a counterattack, and at approximately 10:00 a.m. the Korea Military Academy Training Battalion recaptured the hill. Based on information obtained from North Korean prisoners captured during the action, Colonel Paik Sun-yup concluded that only part of the enemy force had crossed the river. Beginning at around 1:00 p.m., he launched a counteroffensive involving three battalions, including the 11th Regiment and the Infantry School Training Battalion attached to it. The counterattack proceeded successfully, and the 1st Division succeeded in retaking its main defensive line.

However, by this time, Battle of Dongducheon had already fallen to North Korean forces, and the withdrawal of the 7th Infantry Division (South Korea), which had been defending the city, left the right flank of the 1st Division completely exposed.

The 1st Division (North Korea) of the Korean People's Army advanced toward the Gayeoul(present-day Nogok-ri, Baekhak-myeon, Yeoncheon County)–Jeokseong-myeon, Paju sector and launched another attack against the Republic of Korea Army's 13th Regiment with tanks spearheading the assault. The 13th Regiment was unable to halt the advance, and as the main force of the North Korean 1st Division pushed westward along Route 320, it began to threaten Munsan. In addition, North Korean tank units appeared in the rear area of the Republic of Korea Army's 11th Regiment, while attacks from the front also intensified. Ultimately, Colonel Paik Sun-yup abandoned efforts to hold the main defensive line and, at around 7:00 p.m. on 26 June, ordered a withdrawal to the Uijeon Defensive Line (the Bongilcheon Line), the division's final line of resistance. Under the cover of the 15th Regiment, which had been deployed near Uijeon-ri, the units stationed on the main defensive line successfully withdrew and were redeployed along the Uijeon Defensive Line.

27 June

Along the Uijeon Defensive Line, the 15th Regiment (including the 3rd Battalion of the 20th Regiment) was deployed at Uijeon-ri along Route No. 1, while the 13th Regiment was positioned at Donae-ri (present-day Wollong-myeon, Paju) along Route 307. The 11th Regiment was held in reserve, forming part of the final defensive line. Meanwhile, the 12th Regiment, which had been forced to disperse and withdraw during the border battles, was being reorganized at Geumcheon (then part of Siheung County).

Beginning at around 10:00 a.m. on 27 June, the main force of the Korean People's Army's 6th Division, spearheaded by tanks, launched an attack against the front of the Republic of Korea Army's 15th Regiment. The regiment had established an anti-tank defense line equipped with 57 mm recoilless rifles and 2.36-inch bazookas, but these weapons proved ineffective against T-34 tanks. As a result, the commander of the 3rd Battalion, 15th Regiment, personally led a suicide assault unit in close-quarters attacks against the tanks, destroying six of them. The Korean People's Army subsequently abandoned the attack and withdrew, while the 15th Regiment succeeded in overcoming its fear of enemy tanks.

During the fighting along the Uijeon Defensive Line, the front held by the 13th Regiment on the right flank of the 1st Division remained relatively quiet. However, from around 7:00 p.m., the regiment's defensive line came close to collapse under a Combined arms by the Korean People's Army's 1st Division. Nevertheless, after successfully destroying two North Korean tanks with 2.36-inch bazookas, the intensity of the enemy assault diminished, and the regiment was able to regain control of its defensive positions.

==== 28 June ====
During the night of 27 June, taking advantage of heavy rain, North Korean forces launched a night attack that broke through the 1st Division's final defensive line, forcing the regimental units to withdraw from Bongilcheon under cover of darkness. At around the same time, Colonel Paik Sun-yup, commander of the 1st Division, was informed by an operational advisory group led by Major General Kim Hong-il (general), which had been dispatched from Republic of Korea Army Headquarters, of the deteriorating situation along the defensive line in the Mia-ri sector. Anticipating the worst-case scenario, the advisory group recommended that preparations be made for a withdrawal across the Han River (Korea). However, as the existing orders could not be altered, the 1st Division was instructed to hold its current positions for the time being.

At approximately 8:00 a.m. on 28 June, the 1st Division launched a counteroffensive in accordance with its previous orders. The 11th Regiment succeeded in recapturing most of the final defensive line, but the attack by the 13th Regiment on the division's right flank made little progress as it collided head-on with advancing North Korean forces. Colonel Paik Sun-yup committed the Seoul Independent Regiment and the 3rd Battalion of the 20th Regiment to restore the continuity of the defensive line. North Korean resistance on that day was not particularly strong, and the 1st Division assessed that it might even be possible to recapture its main defensive line.

However, at approximately 1:00 p.m. on 28 June, the Republic of Korea Army's final defensive line at Battle of Miari was breached by North Korean tanks. Later that afternoon, the 1st Division found its rear areas cut off and lost communications with Army Headquarters. With ammunition supplies also running low, Colonel Paik Sun-yup concluded that it was no longer possible to hold the division's positions and decided to withdraw. The subsequent operations led directly into the Battle of the Gimpo Peninsula and the Battle of Oryu-dong.

=== Uijeongbu–Mia-ri sector ===
The 7th Infantry Division (South Korea), which was responsible for defending the Uijeongbu sector, had been forced into a major withdrawal from the very first day of the war on 25 June. Its units had become dispersed, and Uijeongbu was under increasing threat. The Chief of Staff of the Republic of Korea Army, Chae Byeong-deok, recognized that Uijeongbu was effectively a corridor through which enemy tanks could fully exploit their mobility and shock effect. Moreover, the area lacked terrain favorable for defense, leaving the defending forces at an overwhelming disadvantage. At this stage of the war, the defense of the Uijeongbu axis had become the most critical problem facing the South Korean military.

==== 26 June ====
Chief of Staff Chae Byeong-deok's counteroffensive plan was based on the assumption that the 2nd Infantry Division (South Korea)would be able to concentrate in the vicinity of Uijeongbu by the morning of 26 June, and that the 3rd Infantry Division (South Korea) and the 5th Infantry Division (South Korea) would also be able to assemble during the course of the day's fighting. However, Guerrilla warfareactivity in the rear areas severely hampered the movement and concentration of rear-echelon units. As a result, by the morning of 26 June, only the headquarters of the 2nd Infantry Division and two battalions of its 5th Regiment had managed to assemble near Uijeongbu. In addition, although the 7th Infantry Division had a total of five battalions available by the early hours of 26 June, this amounted to little more than the strength of a reinforced regiment.

Under these circumstances, Brigadier General Yu Jae-hung, commander of the 7th Infantry Division, expressed dissatisfaction with the order. Brigadier General Lee Hyung-keun, commander of the 2nd Infantry Division, argued that it would be preferable to wait until the entire division had assembled and its combat power had been concentrated before launching a counteroffensive. He further emphasized the importance of holding the defensive line along the Han River, which offered more favorable defensive terrain. However, for political reasons, Chief of Staff Chae Byeong-deok ordered that the counteroffensive be carried out. Accordingly, the 2nd Infantry Division launched a counterattack toward the Pocheon sector, while the 7th Infantry Division advanced toward the Dongducheon sector.

Taking into account the fact that recapturing Pocheon with the forces currently available would be difficult, the commander of the Republic of Korea Army's 2nd Infantry Division decided that, after completing its reorganization at Chukseongnyeong (present-day Soheul-eup, Pocheon) on 25 June, the 3rd Regiment of the 7th Infantry Division would use Chukseongnyeong as a base from which to launch an attack toward Pocheon. As noted above, the only forces available to the 2nd Infantry Division at this time were two battalions of the 5th Regiment. However, the regimental commander of the 5th Regiment was absent, having been assigned to the United States Forces Japan, while the deputy regimental commander was away in Busan. As a result, the regiment was effectively without its senior leadership. Furthermore, when the division departed from Daejeon, it had not received sufficient ammunition supplies. Consequently, it was decided that the regiment would receive logistical support at Chukseongnyeong, and the 5th Regiment began its advance at 3:00 a.m. on 26 June. However, by the time it arrived, the 3rd Regiment, which had been defending Chukseongnyeong, had already abandoned the position and was in the process of withdrawing. Shortly after reaching Chukseongnyeong, the 5th Regiment encountered North Korean armored units and engaged them with 2.36-inch bazookas and mortars. However, these attacks proved ineffective. Less than ten minutes after the engagement began, the defensive line at Chukseongnyeong—one of the key defensive positions protecting Uijeongbu—was breached by the Korean People's Army.

Meanwhile, the 7th Division's counterattack initially proceeded successfully. A composite battalion on the right flank of the 1st Regiment succeeded in recapturing Dongducheon. At this point, Lee Kwon-mu, commander of the Korean People's Army's 4th Division (North Korea), began an attack toward the western flanking route through Bongam-ri (present-day Bongam-ri, Eunhyeon-myeon, Yangju) and Deokjeong-ri (present-day Hoecheon-dong, Yangju). The North Korean 4th Division engaged the 3rd Battalion on the left flank of the South Korean 1st Regiment near Hapae-ri (located near Bongam-ri, Eunhyeon-myeon). However, the 3rd Battalion possessed an effective strength of less than a company, and after approximately thirty minutes of fighting, it was scattered and its position was overrun. The North Korean 4th Division then proceeded to encircle Deokjeong-ri. At this time, the 18th Regiment, which had been attacking Bongam-ri on the left flank of the Republic of Korea Army's 7th Division, received orders to take up defensive positions in Eunhyeon-myeon, northwest of Deokjeong-ri, after the fall of Chukseongnyeong. The 18th Regiment engaged a North Korean armored unit in a single battle but was soon overrun. It later defeated a North Korean logistics unit that appeared in front of its position, but thereafter had no further contact with enemy forces, and communications with division headquarters were also cut off. From the early hours of 27 June, the regiment began a phased withdrawal toward Samsong-ri (present-day Samsong-dong, Goyang).

Going further back, on the morning of 26 June, a Republic of Korea Army advisory meeting was held, attended by senior military figures with extensive experience, including Major General Kim Hong-il (general), Chief of Staff of the Army, and Brigadier General Kim Seok-won (former commander of the 1st Infantry Division). At the beginning of the meeting, Minister of National Defense Shin Sung-mo and Chief of Staff Chae Byeong-deok reported on the progress of the counteroffensive in the Uijeongbu sector and expressed an optimistic view of the situation. However, Major General Kim Hong-il, who regarded the offensive operation in the Uijeongbu sector as overly risky, argued for a decisive battle south of the Han River (Korea), and Brigadier General Kim Seok-won also supported this position. However, the meeting failed to change the policy of the Minister of National Defense and the Chief of Staff, which was to defend Seoul. After the meeting, at an emergency session of the National Assembly, the Minister of National Defense and the Chief of Staff again expressed an optimistic assessment. However, at around 12:00 noon on that day, the North Korean 3rd Division broke through the defensive line of the Republic of Korea Army's 16th Regiment and continued its advance south toward Uijeongbu. Meanwhile, the North Korean 4th Division, after occupying Deokjeong-ri, was advancing toward Uijeongbu from the northwest while preparing a coordinated offensive.

The Republic of Korea Army's 16th Regiment of the 2nd Division arrived in Uijeongbu slightly later than divisional headquarters and the 5th Regiment, and attempted to block the advancing North Korean forces moving from Chukseongnyeong at Geumo-ri (present-day Jagum-dong, Uijeongbu) northeast of Uijeongbu. The 16th Regiment succeeded in destroying one tank using 2.36-inch bazookas, but, judging the situation to be unwinnable, it withdrew. At Geumo-ri, intense resistance was also carried out by Captain Kim Pung-ik, commander of the 2nd Training Unit of the Artillery School, who personally aimed artillery to halt North Korean tanks, but Uijeongbu was occupied by North Korean forces around 1:00 p.m. on 26 June.

The Chief of Staff reorganized the retreating units at Baekseokcheon and, holding Brigadier General Lee Hyung-keun, commander of the 2nd Division, responsible for the fall of Uijeongbu, dismissed him. He then appointed Brigadier General Yu Jae-hung, commander of the 7th Division, as commander of the Uijeongbu sector, placing both divisions under unified command and ordering a withdrawal toward Chang-dong.

Following the fall of Uijeongbu, on the evening of 26 June, the Chief of Staff ordered full preparations for the demolition of the Han River bridges. Under the supervision of Chief of Army Engineers Choi Chang-sik, the installation of explosives on five bridges over the Han River

==== 27 June ====
At around 1:00 a.m. on 27 June, an emergency State Council meeting convened at the Government-General Building(Central Government Complex) decided to relocate the capital to Suwon. No evacuation plan for the civilians of Seoul had been prepared from the outset, and no mention of such measures was made during the emergency State Council meeting. Subsequently, at a late-night session of the National Assembly, a resolution was passed stating that “Members of the National Assembly will defend the capital to the end together with the one million citizens of Seoul.” From 5:00 a.m., at a convened high-level defense meeting, Chief of Staff Chae Byeong-deok stated his resolve that “even if the government moves south, the military will hold Seoul.” However, immediately after the meeting concluded, he received a pessimistic report from the front lines stating that “it would be difficult to hold out through the night.”<

At around 3:00 a.m., President Syngman Rhee decided to flee Seoul following persuasion from those around him. At 6:00 a.m., with the government's announcement of the relocation of the capital to Suwon, the citizens of Seoul—who had until then been receiving only optimistic reports—became aware of the seriousness of the capital’s situation for the first time. Civilians seeking evacuation routes crowded onto the Han River bridges and Seoul Station, while reinforcement vehicles continued moving north, plunging Seoul into chaos.

Meanwhile, in Chang-dong, under the cover of the 25th Regiment, which had been partially detached, efforts were underway to reorganize retreating troops withdrawing from Uijeongbu and to establish a defensive line. The 25th Regiment fiercely resisted, destroying three North Korean tanks, and as a result of intense fighting, remnants of the 1st, 3rd, and 9th Regiments of the 7th Division, the 5th, 16th, and 25th Regiments of the 2nd Division, and the 22nd Regiment of the 3rd Division were reorganized into a force equivalent to six battalions. However, the corridor between Dobongsan and Suraksan was highly favorable terrain for mechanized units, placing the South Korean forces at a disadvantage.

Around 10:00 a.m., before defensive positions were fully completed, the Korean defensive forces came under attack by North Korean forces reinforced with approximately 40 tanks and self-propelled artillery. Although the defenders mounted strong resistance with fire support from 105 mm howitzers of the 2nd Training Unit of the Artillery School, they were unable to stop the tanks and the defensive line was breached. Colonel Ham Jun-ho, commander of the 1st Regiment, was also killed by North Korean gunfire, and the ROK forces fell back in confusion, splitting their withdrawal toward the Battle of Miari and Taereung sectors.

The withdrawal of ROK forces from Seoul began around 12:30 p.m., and Army Headquarters relocated to Siheung County. However, upon receiving news of possible United States intervention, the Chief of Staff reversed his decision, and Army Headquarters was relocated again to Yongsan District around 6:00 p.m.

Amid this confusion in military leadership, on the Mia-dong–Hwigi-dong defensive line, Major General Lee Eung-joon, commander of the 5th Division and concurrently commander of the Mia-ri sector, organized a defensive position and reorganized retreating units under his command, including the 2nd Battalion of the 15th Regiment, the 1st Battalion of the 20th Regiment, and the 2nd Battalion of the 8th Regiment of the Capital Division. The Mia-ri defensive line assigned the 5th Division responsibility for the western sector including Route 3, while the 7th Division held the eastern sector. North Korean forces that had occupied Chang-dong temporarily halted their advance, resulting in a lull on the Mia-ri front, while in the Taereung sector, elements of the 9th Regiment and a student volunteer battalion continued to engage in a standoff. At around the afternoon of 27 June, the Mia-ri–Hwigye-dong defensive line was held by a mixed force of approximately 3,000 troops drawn from two divisions. Despite news of possible U.S. intervention and the importance of defending the capital as the final defensive line protecting Seoul, troop morale remained high. The defensive line was located along a sector with a single main access road, which made it favorable for defense, as blocking the road would effectively halt tank movement. In addition, through the efforts of engineering units and civilians, various defensive works had been constructed around the Mia-ri area, including trenchs, foxholes, and roadblocks.

On the night of 27 June, North Korean forces launched an attack amid heavy rain. At around 7:00 p.m., a reconnaissance cavalry unit and 10 tanks of the Korean People's Army initiated the first assault. An attempt to halt the advance using explosives laid by engineer units failed, but the attack was repelled once through concentrated fire from heavy weapons, including three 105 mm howitzers.

However, at around midnight the same day, several tanks supported by infantry launched a surprise attack, taking advantage of the rain and shifting the situation. With visibility severely reduced, the Republic of Korea Army defensive units became scattered, and the North Korean armored forces advanced through obstacles. At around 1:00 a.m. on 28 June, a tank unit detached from the 105th Tank Brigade, supporting the 4th Division, crossed Mia-ri, breaching Seoul’s final defensive line.

The 2nd Battalion of the 8th Regiment, which had been positioned in Hwigye-dong, withdrew due to a shortage of ammunition, while units in the Taereung area continued to engage North Korean forces until the morning of 28 June before beginning a gradual withdrawal. Units on the Mia-ri defensive line continued to hold their positions without being aware that North Korean tanks had already entered the city. However, from the early hours of the morning, they came under attack by North Korean infantry units and began to withdraw.

=== Gimpo sector ===
North Korean forces were also threatening Seoul from the western flank in the Gimpo Peninsula sector, while the main northern defensive line around Seoul was under pressure in the Uijeongbu and Bongilcheon areas. The northern mouth of the Han River estuary near the Gimpo Peninsula featured a wide river channel and strong tidal variations, making a river-crossing operation difficult, and the Republic of Korea Army had not made preparations for its defense.

On 25 June, the North Korean 6th Division (North Korea), which had occupied Kaesong City, continued its southward advance and reached the Han River, where it immediately began a river-crossing operation. By 6:30 a.m. on 26 June, approximately two to three battalions and two artillery pieces at regimental level had crossed, securing a bridgehead approximately 3 km in depth. On 27 June, the main forces of the 13th Regiment and the 15th Regiment, along with two batteries of an artillery regiment and two batteries of the 17th Independent Artillery Regiment, crossed the river and expanded the bridgehead by an additional 5–6 km in length.

Upon receiving reports of the North Korean crossing operations, Army Headquarters urgently appointed Colonel Gye In-ju, commander of Namsan Military School, as commander of the Gimpo sector combat command. He was ordered to organize and coordinate all available forces—including the 2nd Battalion of the 12th Regiment of the Republic of Korea Army, which had retreated after crossing the river, students from Namsan Military School, Infantry School, and Engineer School, units such as the Homeland Defense Battalion (Boguk Battalion), and elements of the Independent Armored Regiment deployed to the Gimpo area—in order to block the North Korean river crossing.

Around 4:00 p.m. on 26 June, as the South Korean defensive forces were completing their position setup, reconnaissance elements of the North Korean crossing began to become visible. Two hours later, several North Korean vessels approached Gannyeongpo at the northern tip of the Gimpo Peninsula. (Note: This follows the official war history published by the South Korean military. By this time, the Korean People's Army (KPA) had already crossed the river with enough troops to establish a bridgehead approximately 3 km long. However, the KPA did not engage in any specific combat actions after crossing, and the South Korean military maintained almost no forces in this area. Consequently, it is presumed that the actual detection of the crossing was significantly delayed.) The 5th Company of the 2nd Battalion of the 12th Regiment, deployed on the front line, opened fire on North Korean troops as they began disembarking, inflicting heavy casualties. An armored car platoon also managed to sink a North Korean Cargo ship using M3 37 mm anti-tank gun fire mounted on an M8 Greyhound. However, that night, North Korean forces covertly inserted a small unit into the high ground around Gannyeongpo and simultaneously landed a company-sized force on Ganghwa Island, attacking the rear of the Homeland Defense Battalion.

From the early hours of 27 June, the North Korean 14th Regiment began a full-scale river crossing operation under covering fire from the opposite bank. As the South Korean defensive forces came under severe pressure and the Homeland Defense Battalion’s front line was breached, cutting off withdrawal routes, the defensive line began to collapse. Army Headquarters reinforced the Gimpo sector combat command by attaching the 3rd Battalion of the 22nd Regiment from the 3rd Infantry Division, the 3rd Battalion of the 8th Regiment from the Capital Defense Division, and the 8th Company of the Independent Armored Regiment’s dismounted reconnaissance unit. The Gimpo sector command reorganized retreating units and newly arrived reinforcements, designating the Hill 73 defense line on Mt. Unyu in Gimpo-eup as the final defensive position. The main North Korean force that had taken control of the Jangnim area (present-day Jangnim, Tongjin-eup, Gimpo) halted its pursuit and began regrouping.

In the early morning of 28 June, North Korean forces launched a simultaneous two-pronged assault. One force crossed the Han River using fishing boats carrying assault troops and landed north of Daecheong, while the main force advanced along the road toward Gimpo with two tanks at the front, attacking the defensive line of the 3rd Battalion of the 22nd Regiment. Although South Korean forces concentrated fire from 2.36-inch bazookas and 37 mm armored car guns, they were unable to stop the tanks. The commander of the Gimpo sector combat command then immediately committed the reserve unit—the 2nd Battalion of the 12th Regiment (partially understrength)—in a counterattack, but it struggled, and as artillery fire began falling on Gimpo city itself, the defending forces started to withdraw.

=== Urban combat in Seoul and withdrawal across the Han River ===
At 1:00 a.m. on 28 June 1950, the final defensive line of the Republic of Korea Army at Mia-ri was breached, resulting in the collapse of the last barrier protecting Seoul. At around 1:45 a.m., upon receiving reports that North Korean tanks had entered Donam-dong, which was then part of Seoul, Chief of Staff Chae Byeong-deok immediately ordered the demolition of the Hangang Bridge (Incheon Bridge) and crossed the Han River toward Siheung County. Immediately after the Chief of Staff departed, Brigadier General Lee Hyung-keun, commander of the 2nd Division, Major General Lee Eung-joon, commander of the 5th Division, and Major General Yu Jae-hung, commander of the 7th Division, arrived at Army Headquarters. Upon hearing the demolition order, they argued that since front-line units were still continuing combat without having received withdrawal orders, the bridges should be demolished only after the units had been safely withdrawn. Colonel Kim Baek-il, Chief of the Administrative Staff, also agreed with this view, and Colonel Jang Chang-guk, Director of Operations, was ordered to suspend the demolition of the bridges. Colonel Jang Chang-guk hurried toward the demolition command post at Namhan River Police Station, but Seoul—especially the area north of the Han River—was in complete chaos due to refugees and retreating troops, making road movement difficult.

At the demolition command post, following the Chief of Staff’s order, Colonel Choi Chang-sik, Chief of Army Engineers, issued the demolition order at around 2:20 a.m. on 28 June. At that time, Military police and police at the bridge attempted to stop retreating vehicles without authorization, but were overwhelmed. With the ignition signal, the Hangang Bridge (Incheon Bridge) and three railway bridges were destroyed. Colonel Jang Chang-guk, who was en route to stop the demolition order, heard a massive explosion not far from the command post.

The demolition of the Hangang Bridge (Incheon Bridge) resulted in the deaths of an estimated 500–800 people. (Note: Although the bombing of the Han River Bridge resulted in the deaths of 500 to 800 people and damaged around 80 vehicles, some studies suggest that the victims of the explosion were not civilians.) In addition, around the Bukhan River police post area, approximately 40 vehicles were destroyed by shrapnel and many people were injured. The withdrawal route of the main Republic of Korea Army forces was also cut off, and 1,318 vehicles supporting the ROK Army, along with equipment and supplies, were abandoned on the northern bank of the Han River and subsequently captured by North Korean forces. However, due to a failure in the explosive charges, the double-track railway bridge on the Gyeongbu Line and the single-track railway bridge on the Gyeongin Line were not completely destroyed. As a result, this later allowed North Korean tanks to cross the Han River, significantly affecting subsequent military operations during the Battle of the Han River.

The North Korean forces entered downtown Seoul at around 11:30 a.m. on 28 June. The Republic of Korea Army was not in a position to conduct an organized urban battle, and units already in the city—including the Capital Defense Command, elements of the 1st Engineer Battalion, and retreating formations that had fallen back into Seoul—fought independently in their respective sectors. In the Samgakji and Mapo areas, the 1st Battalion of the 18th Regiment under the Capital Defense Command engaged advancing North Korean tanks. Its 57 mm anti-tank guns and close-assault attacks failed to achieve significant results, but an anti-aircraft fire unit succeeded in shooting down a North Korean combat aircraft. Meanwhile, elements of the 3rd Battalion of the 5th Regiment, which had withdrawn from the Mia-ri defensive line, confirmed the entry of 12 North Korean tanks and infantry units into Cheongnyangni and attempted close-quarters combat, though no confirmed tank losses were recorded, and only 3 of the 10 members of the assault team returned. At Namsan (Seoul), a company-sized force gathered under Colonel Lee Yong-mun of the Staff College fought to the end under the name “Baekho Unit,” and the survivors later turned to guerrilla warfare. At Seoul National University Hospital, a security platoon resisted until the end and was completely killed in action. Of approximately 100 hospitalized patients, around 80 also took up positions on the hill behind the hospital and resisted, but were all killed. Afterwards, invading North Korean forces carried out massacre of the hospitalized patients. The resistance of these units was not organized, but it was highly determined, and even on the outer defensive lines of Seoul, scattered resistance continued. As a result, it took approximately 10 hours for North Korean forces to advance from the breakthrough of the Mia-ri defensive line to the Han River defensive line.

== Repercussions ==
At the time the Hangang Bridge was demolished, the main forces of the Republic of Korea Army—the 2nd, 3rd, 5th, and 7th Infantry Divisions, along with units of the Capital Defense Command—were still engaged in combat on the outer defensive lines of Seoul, while the 1st Division was holding the southern defensive line in Paju and conducting limited counterattacks to delay the North Korean advance. However, once the bridges were destroyed and the entry of North Korean forces into Seoul was confirmed, these units rapidly began to collapse and withdraw. Regarding this situation, the Military History Research and Development Association of the Japan Ground Self-Defense Force Staff College (formerly the Japanese Army War College (Japan)), composed of operational instructors of military history, assessed that “the main forces of the South Korean Army collapsed at an unbelievable speed, not only due to the North Korean offensive but also because they themselves cut off their own lines of retreat too early, which proved to be a decisive factor.”

The 1st Division and reinforcement units defending the Munsan sector carried out a dispersed river crossing at Isanpo ferry, southwest of Bongilcheon-ri, and at Haengju near Gimpo Airport. However, at Isanpo, they suffered heavy casualties due to North Korean attacks at the landing site. The 1st Division and attached units suffered a total of approximately 3,500 killed or missing (Note: However, most of the missing personnel returned to their original units one after another following the Battle of the Han River.) during the border clashes and the Battle of Seoul, with the majority of losses occurring during the river-crossing operations. After crossing the river, the 1st Division was reduced to a strength of approximately 5,000 personnel; however, the soldiers carried as much portable equipment as possible during the crossing.

The mixed forces that had been conducting defensive operations in the Mia-ri sector crossed the Han River at multiple ferry points, including Mapo, Hajung-ri (present-day Seogang-dong), Seobinggo-dong, Hannam-dong, Ttukseom, and Gwangnaru. The 7th Division, which had been engaged in combat since the early stages of the border clashes, was reduced to a total strength of 1,200 personnel after crossing the Han River, and retained only four machine guns as heavy equipment. Units that crossed at Gwangnaru assembled directly in Suwon, while those that crossed at Seobinggo, Hannam-dong, and Ttukseom regrouped in Suwon and Siheung. Units that crossed at Haengju, Hajung-ri, and Mapo mostly gathered in Siheung. The withdrawal forces had largely completed regrouping between the night of 28 June and the morning of 29 June. However, even afterward, some ROK soldiers who had failed to escape Seoul remained in hiding within the city, and others attempted to return to their units individually but were captured by North Korean forces. On 29 July, Brigadier General An Byeong-beom, who had failed to escape Seoul, committed suicide by disembowelment on Inwangsan Mountain in the city.

Meanwhile, North Korean forces also overestimated the strategic value of Seoul, and their advance stalled for a time after its capture. During this gap, the South Korean Army desperately reorganized and established a Han River defensive line. In addition, on 27 June, the United States began providing military support to South Korea, and from 28 June onward, the United States Air Force began full-scale intervention. On 29 June, naval gunfire support from United States Navy cruisers also commenced.

On 30 June, President Harry S. Truman issued a statement declaring that the North Korean invasion had provided evidence of an increased communist threat to the Pacific region and to the United States. He also ordered support for the Republic of Korea’s air and ground forces in response to the aggression. In addition, he directed the U.S. Seventh Fleet to ensure the firm defense of Taiwan and reinforced American forces in the Philippines.

United Nations Security Council adopted Resolution 84 in response to the North Korean invasion. The core provision of the resolution authorized the use of the United Nations flag in operations against North Korean forces and their allies. The Security Council also recommended that member states assist the Republic of Korea in repelling the attack and in restoring international peace and security.

== In popular culture ==
- 72 Hours (72시간, 2024)

== See also ==
- Second Battle of Seoul
- Third Battle of Seoul
- Fourth Battle of Seoul

== Sources ==
- Baek, Seon-yeop (2000). 若き将軍の朝鮮戦争 ‐ 白善燁回顧録 [The Young General's Korean War - Baek Seon-yup's Retrospective] (in Japanese). Soshisha. ISBN 4-7942-0974-6.
- Institute for Military History of the Republic of Korea Armed Forces (2000). 韓国戦争 第1巻 人民軍の南侵と国連軍の遅滞作戦 [The Korean War, Vol. 1: The People's Army's Invasion of the South and the UN Forces' Delaying Operations] (in Japanese). Kaya Shobo. ISBN 4-906124-41-0.
