= Nodeulseom =

Artificial island in Seoul, South Korea

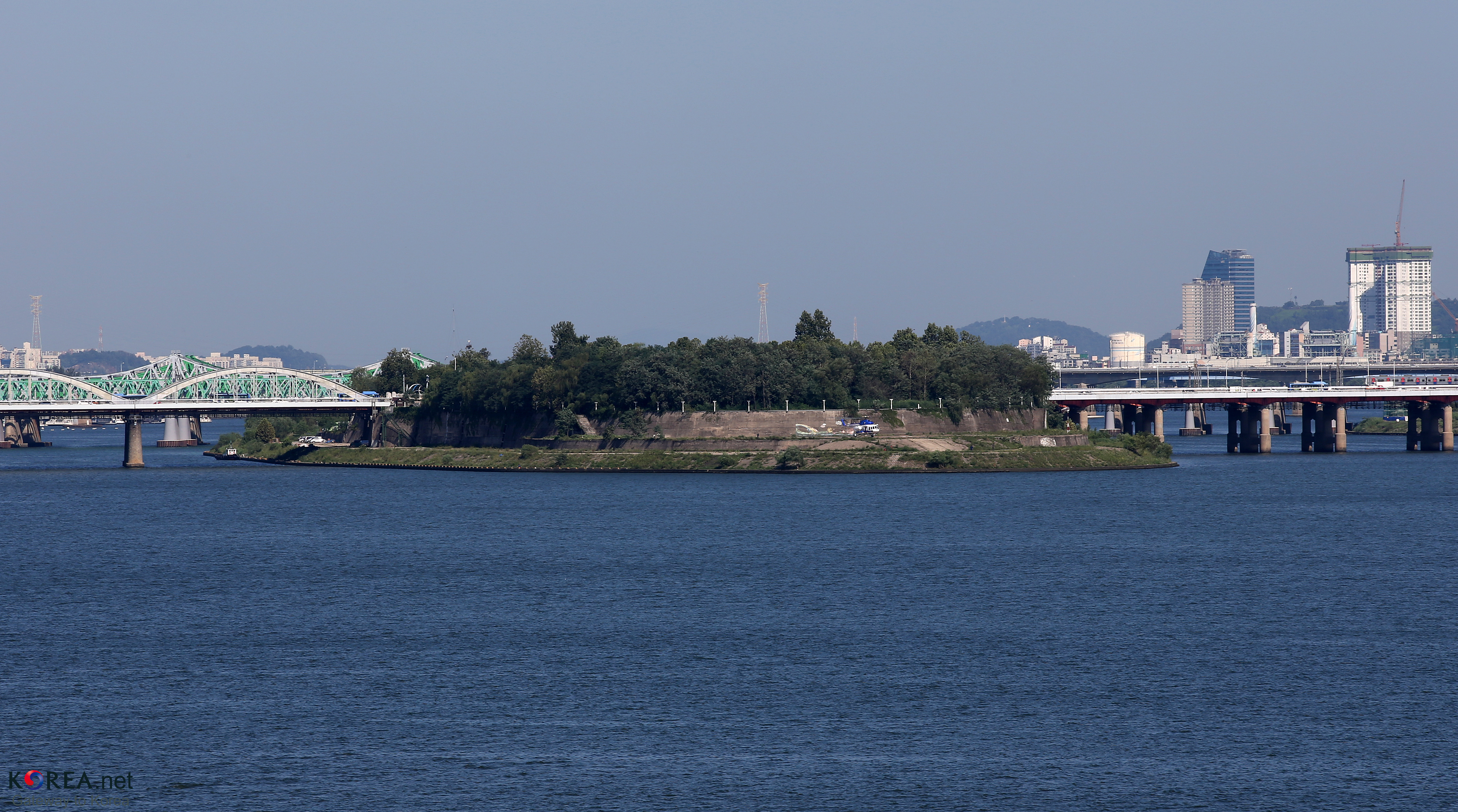
- The island, with Hangang Bridge crossing over it (2014)

Geography
- Coordinates: 37°31′1″N 126°57′36″E

Korean name
- Hangul: 노들섬
- RR: Nodeulseom
- MR: Nodŭlsŏm

Nodeulseom (Korean: 노들섬) is an artificial island in the River Han in Seoul, South Korea. The uninhabited island is located to the east of the larger island of Yeouido. Hangang Bridge passes directly over the island.

On September 28, 2019, the island was re-opened as a music-themed cultural complex following a four-year renovation project. On the island, there are various cultural facilities including an outdoor music space, bookstore, a large green open area and a two-meter moon art installation called Moonlight Nodeul.

== History ==
Before the 20th century, this area was part of the mainland and on the bank of the Han River. In this area and during the Joseon period, there was a village called Sincho-ri (신초리; 新草里). It was attested to existing in 1683. Around the 1900's, it had possibly around 300 residents, with upper and lower subdivisions (상동; 윗마을; lit. upper village and 하동; 아랫마을; lit. lower village). These areas were possibly elevated from the rest of the area in order to dodge the Han River's regular floods.

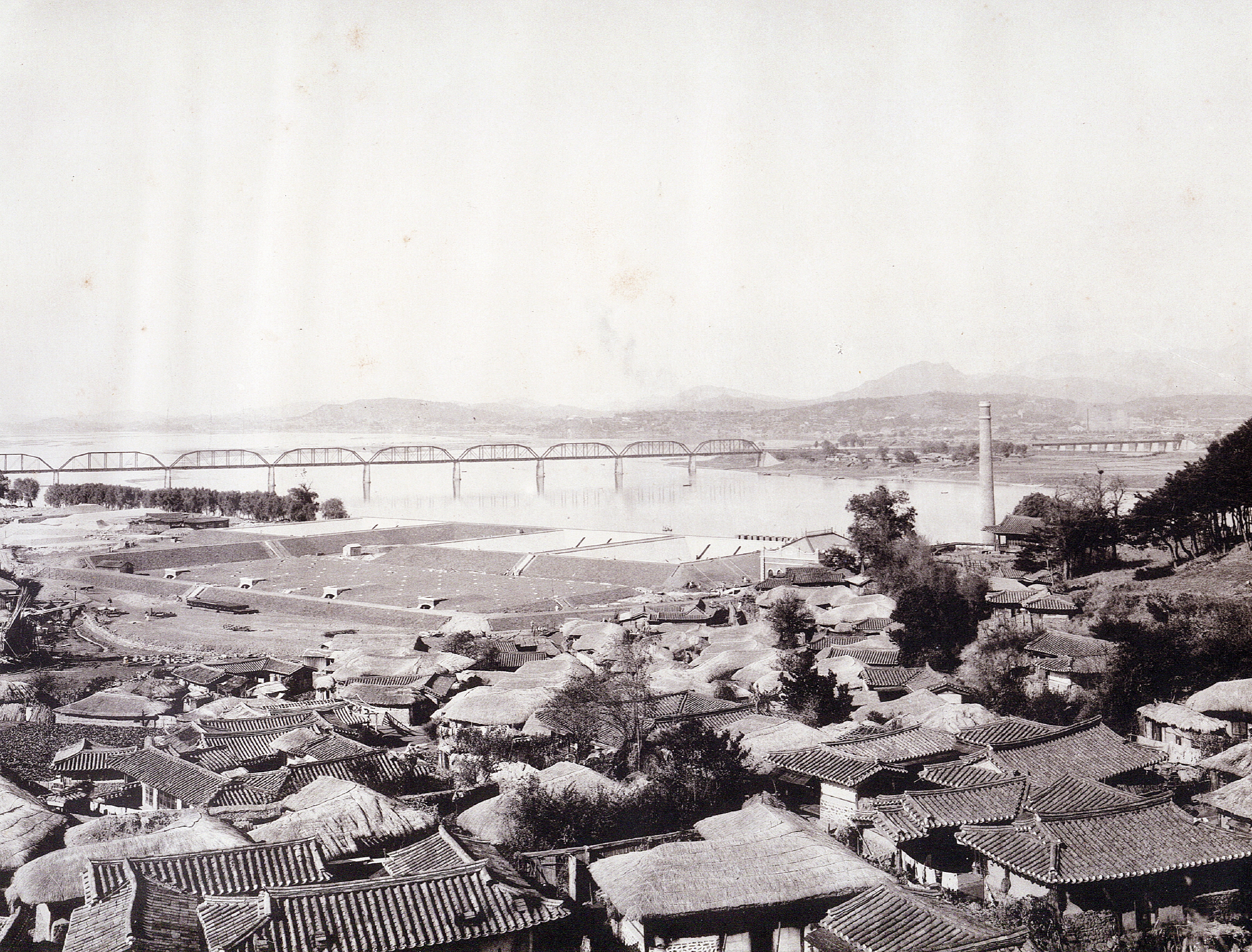
Part of Sincho-ri is visible here, on the right in the distance, at the middle of the bridge (1911)

In 1913, during the 1910–1945 Japanese colonial period, ethnic Korean marquis of the Japanese Empire Yi Haech'ang (a member of the royal House of Yi) claimed ownership of the land of Sincho-ri and sold it to the Government-General of Chōsen without the consent of its occupants. Japanese tax collectors arrived and demanded that Korean residents pay taxes to them; people who did not were reportedly beat and threatened.

In response, 86 male residents of Sincho-ri filed a lawsuit in the Keijō District Court against Yi. During the lawsuit, it was revealed that Yi had no documentation to prove that he had owned the land; he claimed that they were lost during the turmoils of the previous few decades. Three months after the lawsuit was filed, an elder of Sincho-ri who had spearheaded the lawsuit was sentenced to three months in prison for embezzlement; a reporter for The Hankyoreh theorizes the arrest was motivated by or related to their lawsuit.

Within four years of the lawsuit's filing, the village was forcibly removed. The colonial government extracted a large amount of sand from the area, which resulted in the plot of land becoming an island, which was dubbed in Japanese "Nakanoshima" (中之島). The Hangang Bridge was constructed over the island, and opened on October 7, 1917. The bridge was eventually destroyed by the U.S. military in the Korean War to prevent the North Koreans from using it, although it was eventually rebuilt. During the 1970s and 1980s, the land was further altered during the presidencies of Park Chung Hee and Chun Doo-hwan, who extracted more sand from the island.

In accordance with a development plan in 1989, a tennis court was built on the island. A plan once existed to build a large-scale citizen's park on the island, but this was abandoned. In the mid-2000s, it was proposed to build an opera house on the island, but this did not come to pass. In the early 2010s, a plan existed to have community farms on the island. In October 2017, construction began on a small performing arts center on the island, which opened on September 28, 2019.

A plan to turn the island into a public park was unveiled in 2024. The project, designed by Thomas Heatherwick, is expected to open in 2027.

== See also ==
- List of artificial islands
- List of islands
- Desert island
