= Hangang Bridge bombing =

1950 demolition operation by the South Korean Army in Seoul during the Korean War

Coordinates: 37°31′03″N 126°57′32″E

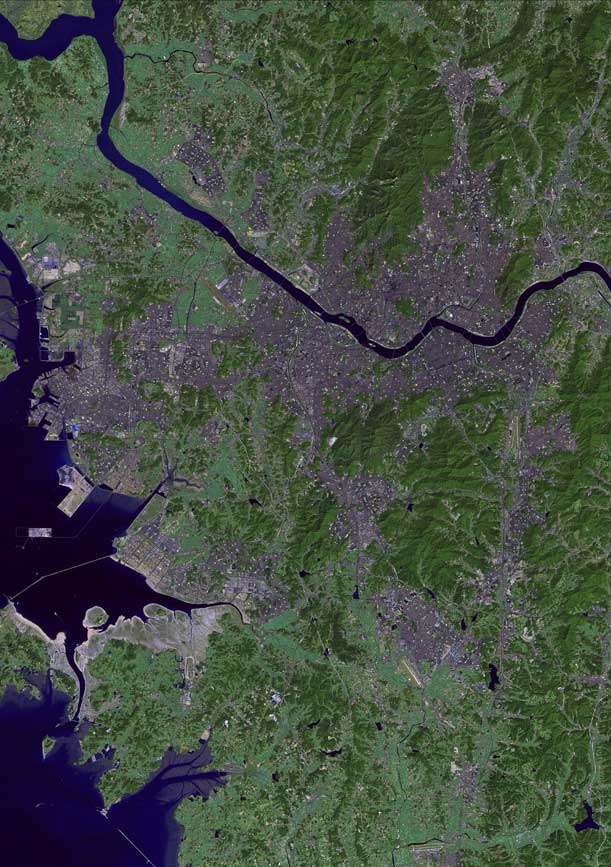
- Han River in Seoul
- Native name: 한강 인도교 폭파
- Location: Hangang Bridge, Seoul, South Korea
- Date: 28 June 1950
- Attack type: Bombing
- Deaths: 200–800
- Perpetrator: Republic of Korea Army
- Convicted: Col. Choi Chang-sik

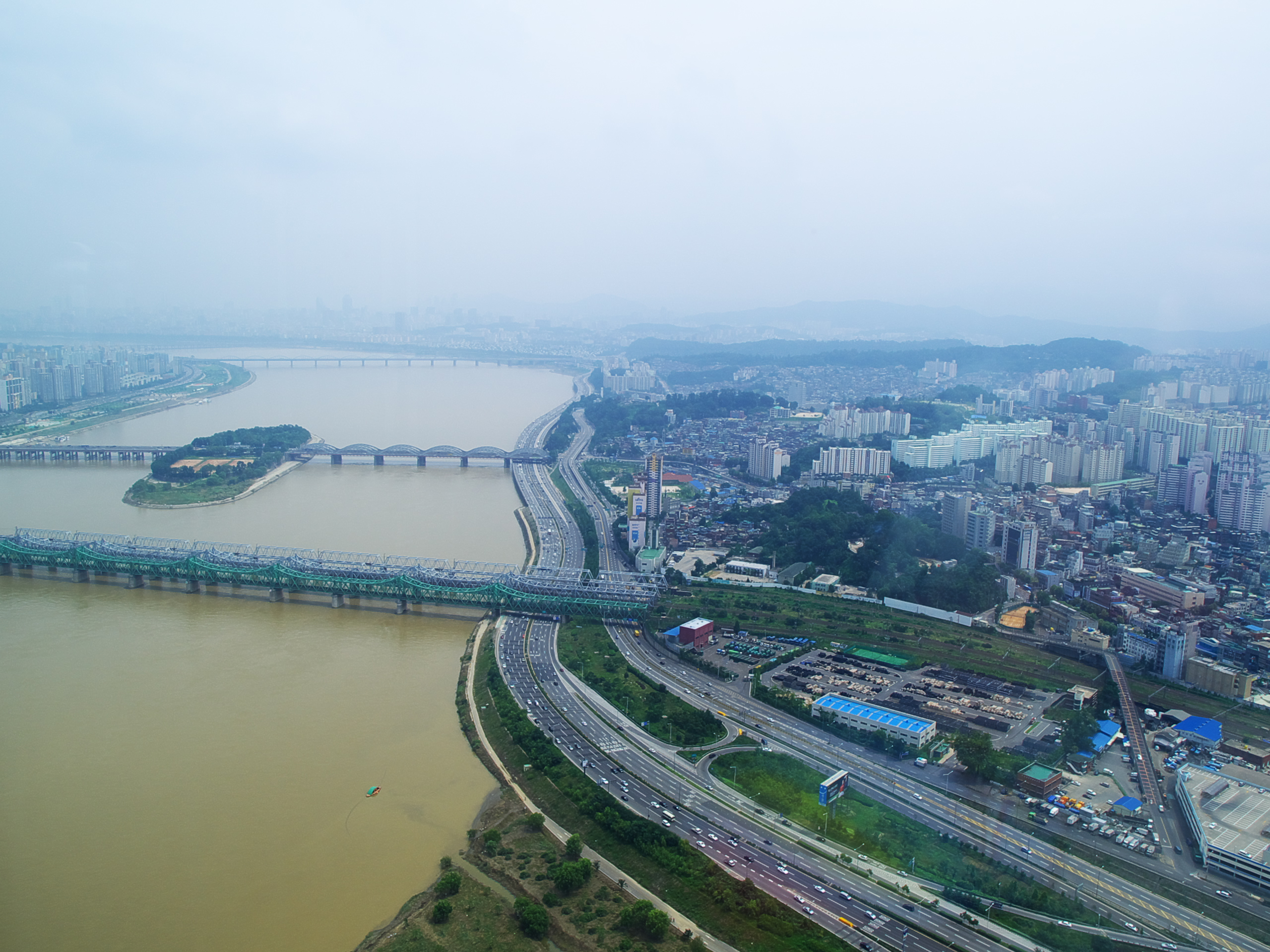
The current Hangang Railway Bridge in Seoul.

The Hangang Bridge bombing (Korean: 한강 인도교 폭파; Hanja: 漢江人道橋爆破) was a demolition operation conducted by the South Korean Army to destroy the Hangang Bridge in Seoul, South Korea, on 28 June 1950, to delay the rapid North Korean Army advance towards the Southern part of Seoul.

On 25 June, North Korea invaded South Korea, sparking the Korean War. Against a lightly armed and poorly equipped South Korean military, the North Korean assault forces and supporting tanks easily overwhelmed their defenses and within two days were positioned extremely close to Seoul.

In the early morning of 27 June, President Syngman Rhee had himself evacuated away from Seoul by his special train with several other South Korean government officials, despite informing his country on the previous day (26 June) of the decision by him and his government cabinet to remain behind in the capital city even with the looming threat of a North Korean attack on it. At 11:00 am, the South Korean Army headquarters decided to destroy the Hangang Bridge to stop the North Korean invasion and gave up defending Seoul. From noon to 3:30 pm on 27 June, the South Korean Army planted 3,600 pounds of TNT at the Hangang Bridge in preparation for its demolition. At 11:30pm, the demolition warning-order was issued. However, the South Korean Army failed to announce the approaching demolition to Seoul residents.

On 28 June, at 2:30 am, the demolition charges were detonated without warning. On the bridge were retreating soldiers and policemen crossing the river when it was demolished. ROK Ministry of National Defense confirmed that 77 policemen from Seoul Jongno Police Station died in the blast at that time.

Three American war correspondents – Burton Crane of The New York Times, Frank Gibney of Time magazine and Keyes Beech of the Chicago Daily News – were trying to cross the bridge by jeep. The blast occurred in their faces (only 25 yards away), shattering their windshield. Burton Crane and Keyes Beech reported their experience immediately. When it came to casualties in the articles, they only announced that truckloads of South Korean soldiers were all killed without mentioning anything about civilian casualties.

It was estimated there were 200–800 killed (mostly soldiers and policemen) but the exact number and identification of victims has not been established yet.

The South Korean Army's Fifth Division was also cut off from its retreat path, leaving it stranded on the north bank of the Han River and at the mercy of the oncoming North Korean forces. At 11:00 am, the North Korean Army then reached the bridge, and shortly after crossing the river, successfully occupied Seoul.

The military engineer responsible for the bridge and carrying out the demolition, Colonel Choi Chang-sik, was court-martialed for misbehavior before the enemy. He was found guilty and sentenced to death. Chang-sik was executed by firing squad on 21 September 1950. In 1964, Choi's wife pleaded his innocence to an appeal tribunal and the court found Choi as not guilty because the demolition order was issued by his superior officers.

On 28 June 2007, the first memorial service was held by a local veterans' peace association.

== See also ==
- First Battle of Seoul - the battle that caused the bridge bombing
