= Hangang Railway Bridge =

Rail bridge in Seoul, South Korea

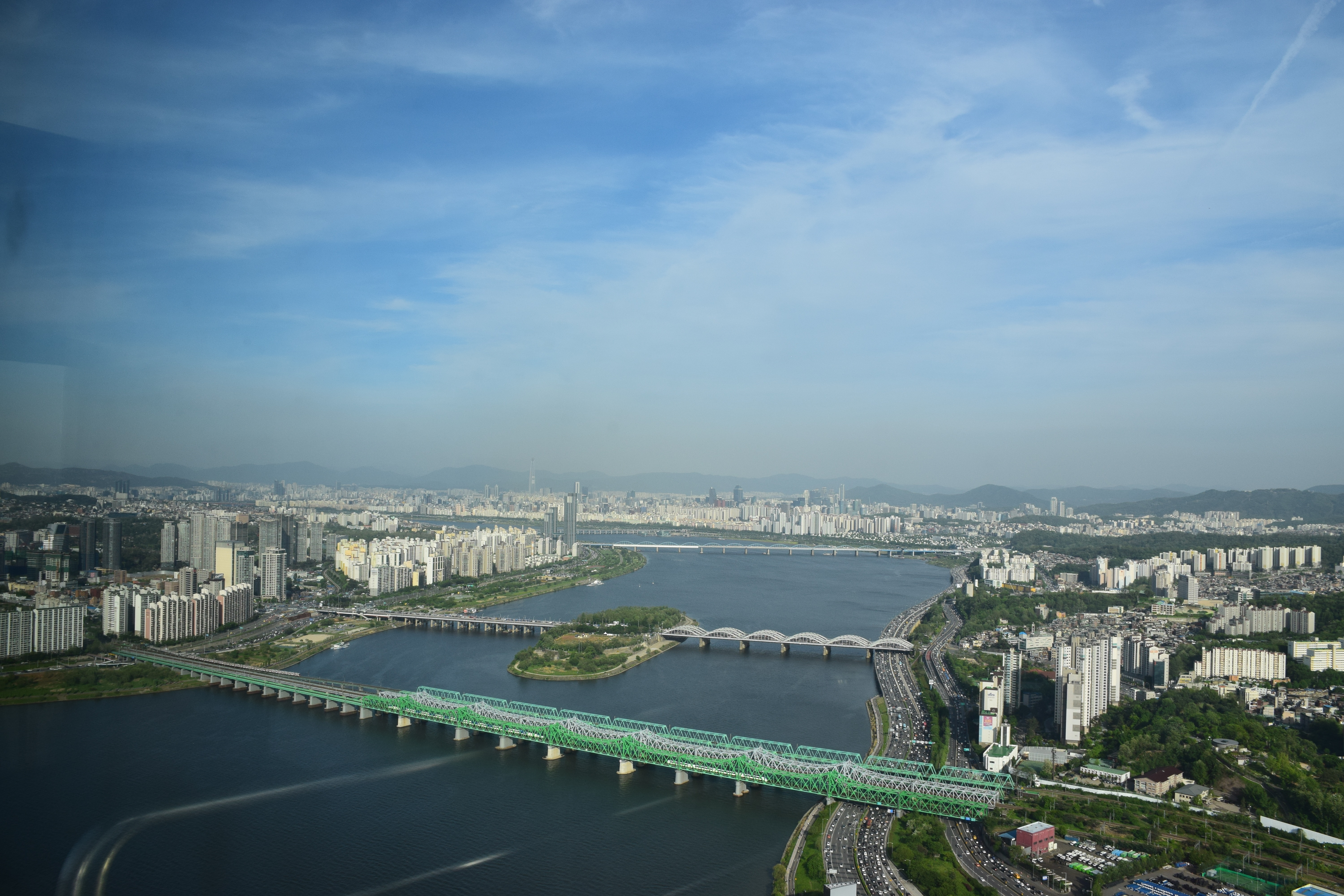
- The bridge, closest to camera (2015)
- Coordinates: 37.5196°N 126.9518°E
- Crosses: Han River
- Named for: Han River ("Hangang")

History
- Construction start: March 1897
- Construction end: July 1900

Location
- Interactive map of Hangang Railway Bridge

- Hangang Railway Bridge
- Hangul: 한강철교
- Hanja: 漢江鐵橋
- RR: Hangang cheolgyo
- MR: Han'gang ch'ŏlgyo

The Hangang Railway Bridge (Korean: 한강철교) crosses the Han River in Seoul, South Korea and connects Noryangjin Station and Yongsan Station. It was the first permanent crossing on the Han River.

== History ==
In March 1896, King Gojong of Joseon granted the American businessman James R. Morse a contract to build a railway between Chemulpo (modern-day Incheon) and Seoul. As part of the railway, construction of the bridge started in March 1897, but due to financial difficulties, Morse's venture was transferred to a Japanese consortium in May 1897. Though the initial contract stipulated the construction of a walkway for pedestrians alongside the railroad tracks, the Japanese consortium finished the construction of the bridge in July 1900 without the walkway, citing financial burden.

The construction of the Gyeongbu Line in 1905 necessitated the construction of a second railway bridge, which was finished in September 1912. A footbridge, the precursor to the Hangang Bridge, was finished in 1917. A severe flood in July 1925 necessitated repairs, including the raising of the bridge by one meter. A third (double track) railway bridge opened in August 1944, and a fourth railway bridge (also double-track) opened in December 1994.

== Gallery ==
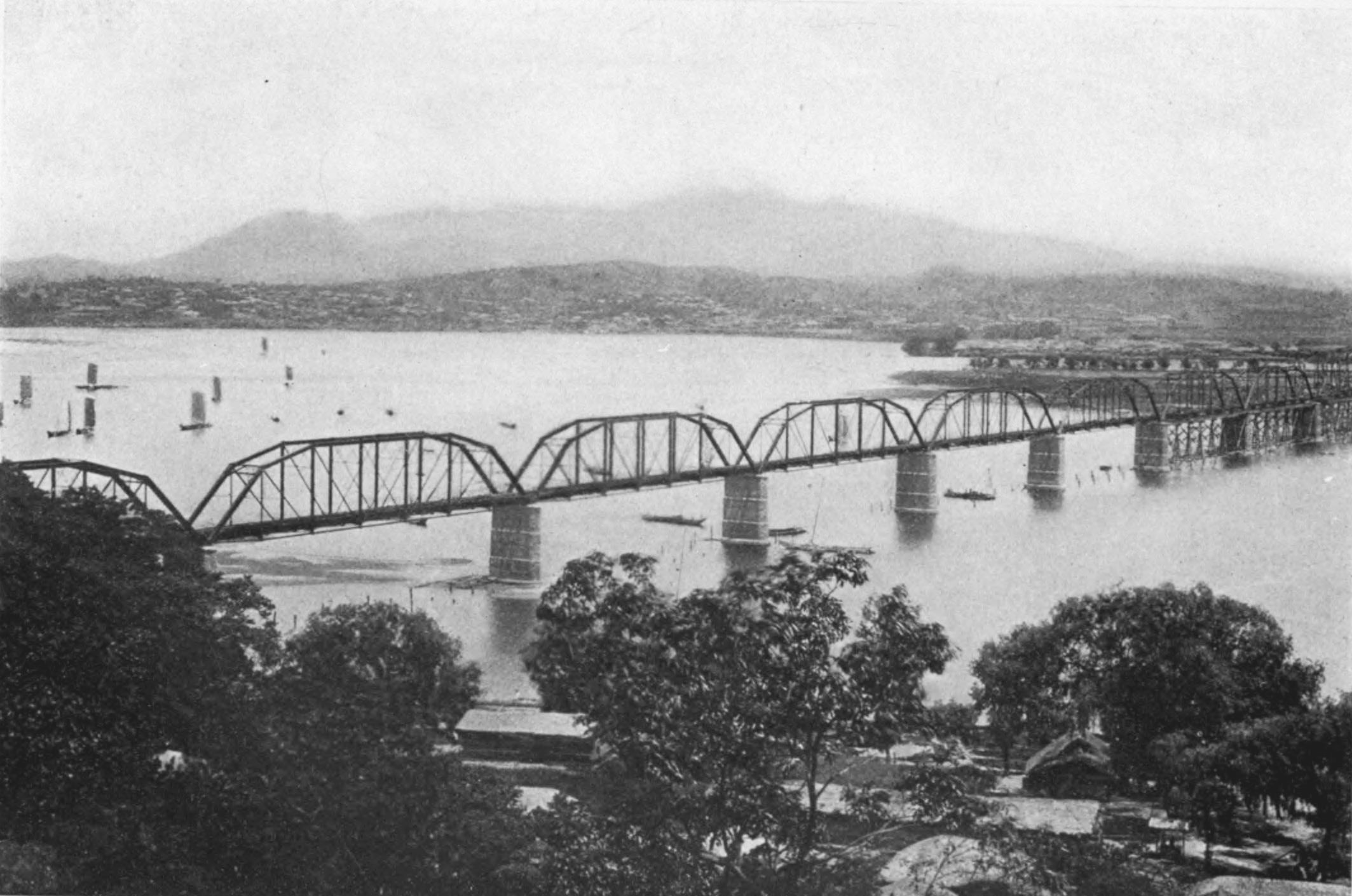
The bridge, from a book by Homer Hulbert (1900)

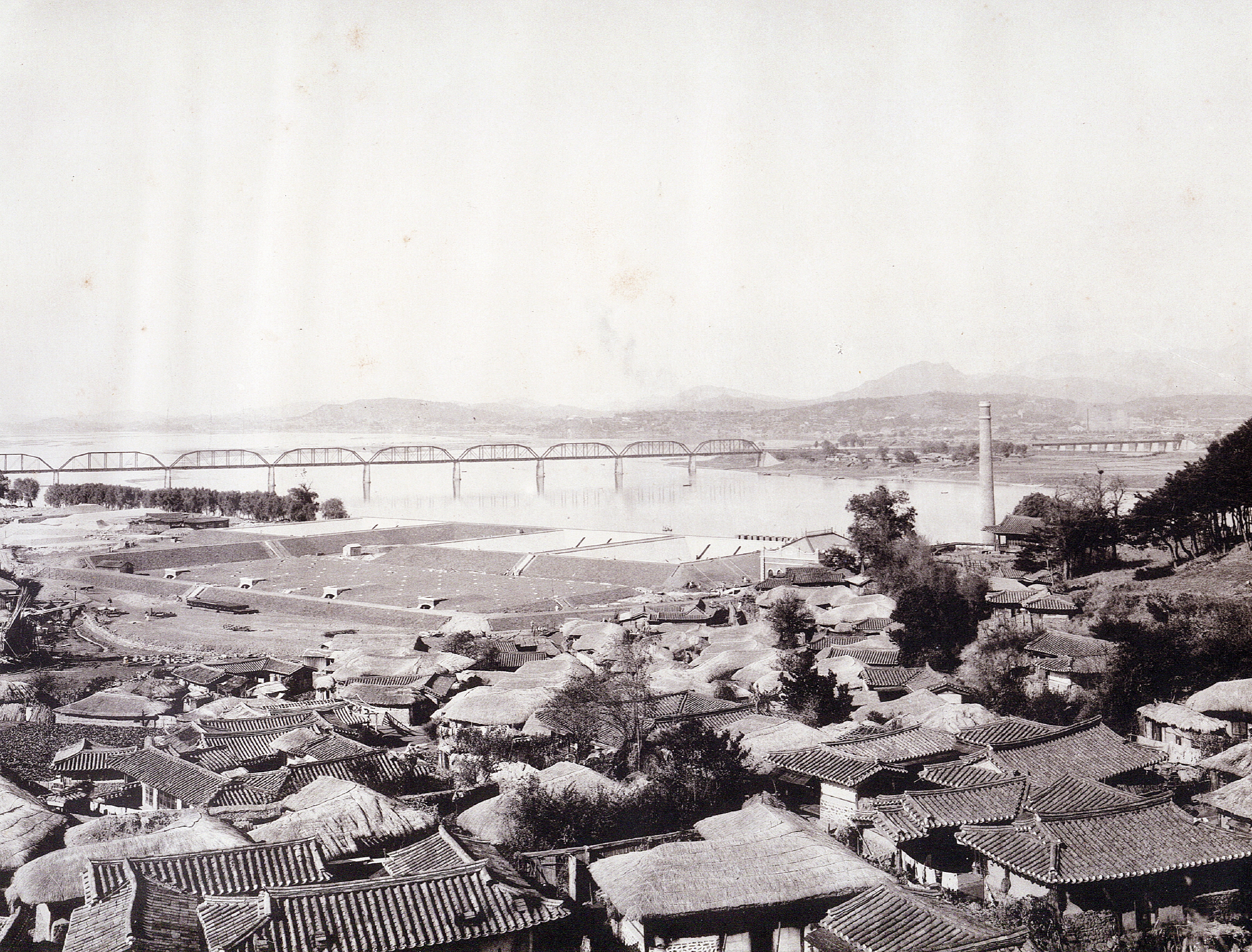
The bridge, from Yongsan on the north side of the river (1910)

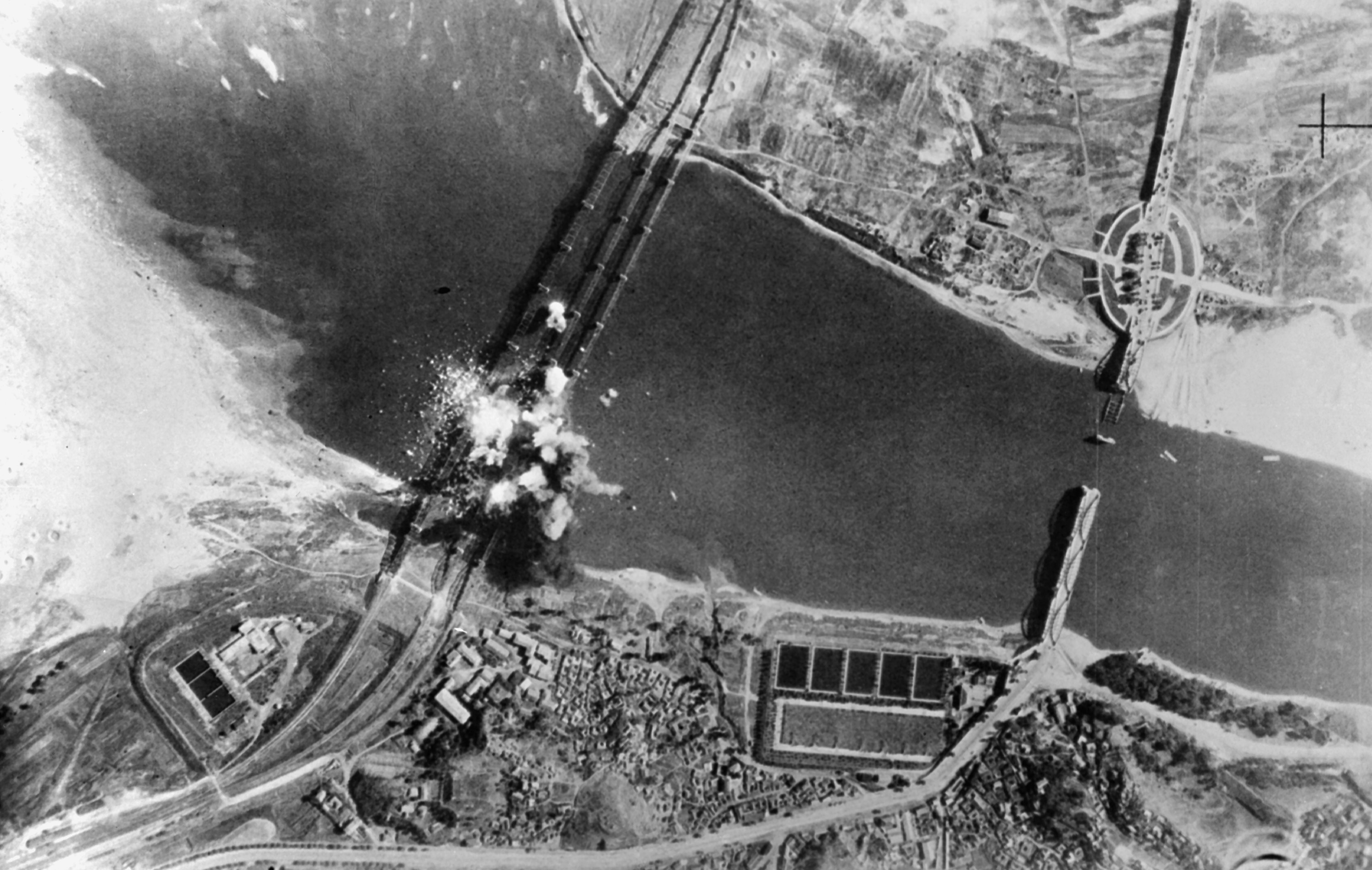
Bombed by the U.S. during the Korean War (1950)

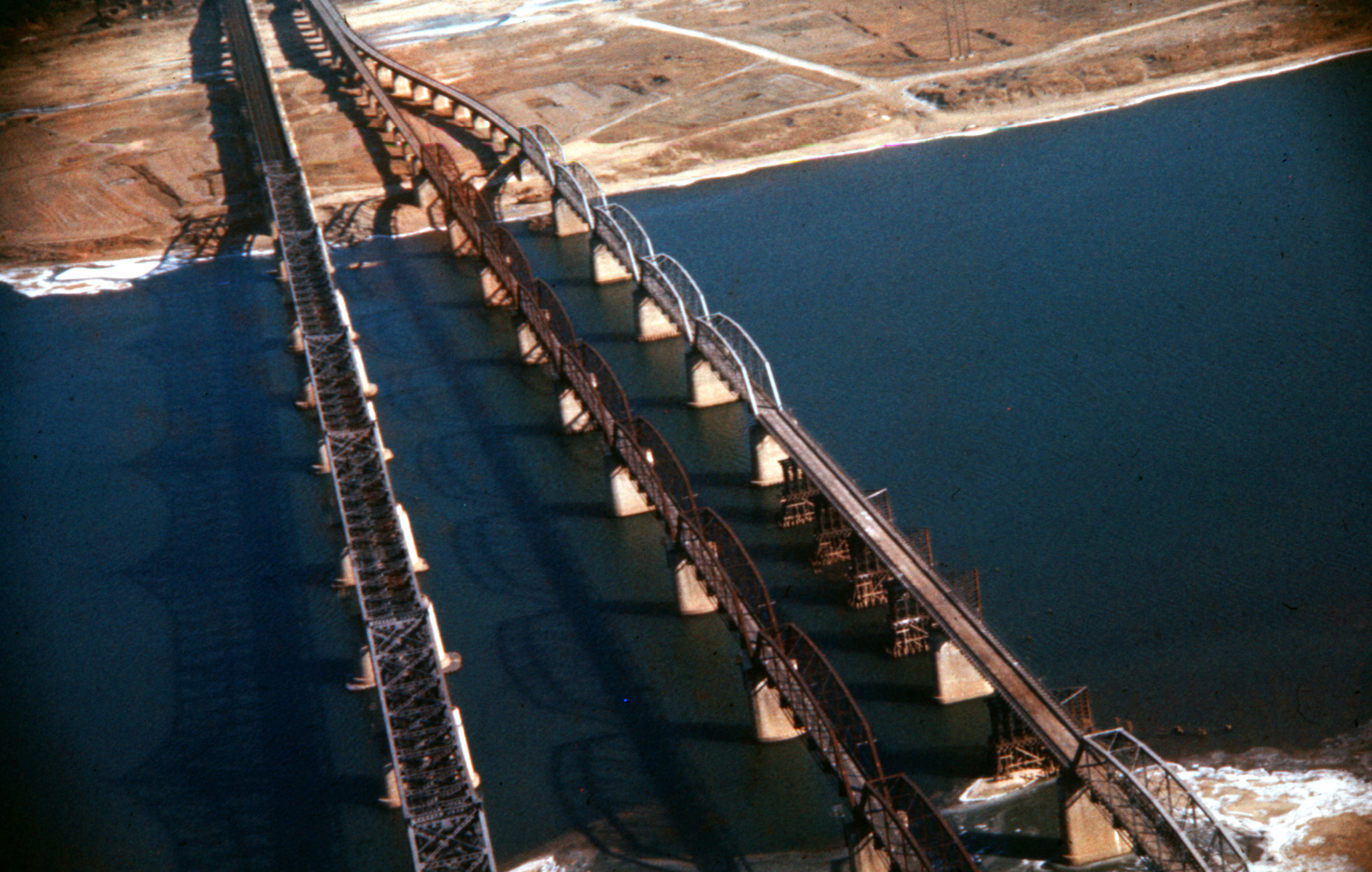
The bridge from above (1960)

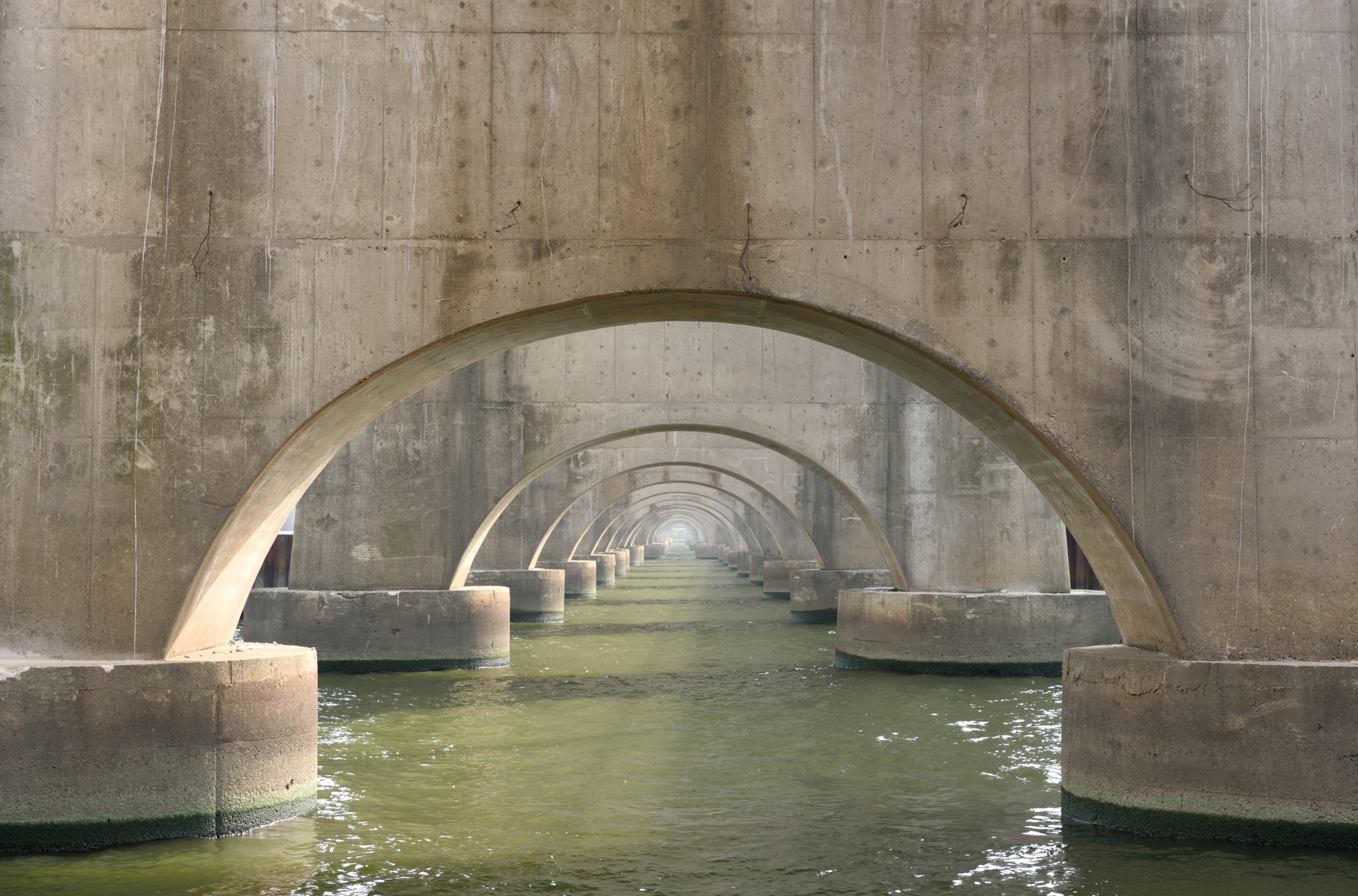
Underside of the bridge (2015)
