= Hangang Bridge =

Road bridge in Seoul, South Korea

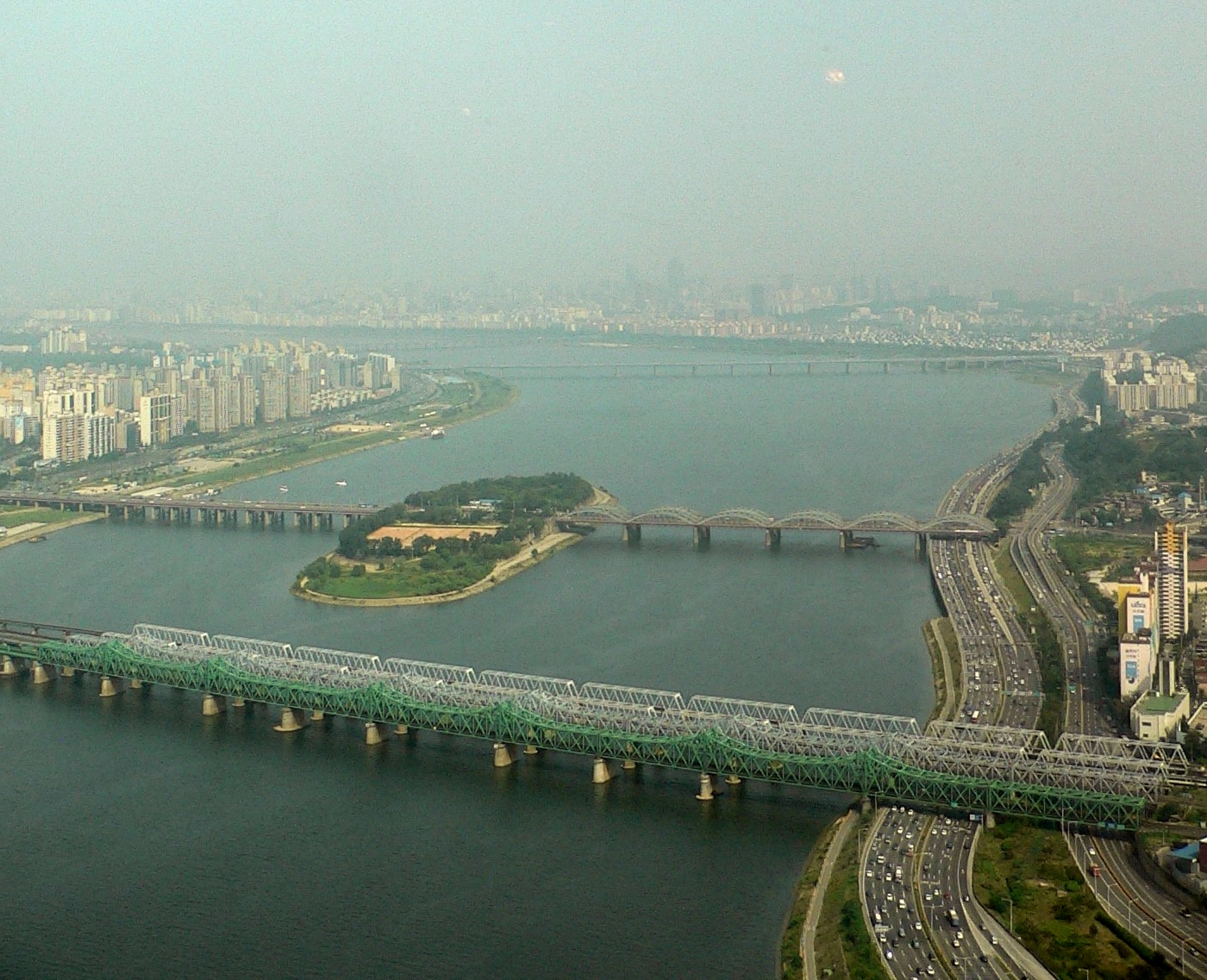
- The bridge in center of image, passing over the island Nodeulseom (2005)
- Coordinates: 37.5159°N 126.9578°E
- Crossed: Han River, Nodeulseom
- Named for: Han River ("Hangang")

History
- Rebuilt: 1954
- Destroyed: 1950

Korean name
- Hangul: 한강대교
- Hanja: 漢江大橋
- RR: Hangang daegyo
- MR: Han'gang taegyo

Location
- Interactive map of Hangang Bridge

The Hangang Bridge (Korean: 한강대교; lit. 'Han River Great Bridge') crosses the Han River in Seoul, South Korea. It connects the districts of Yongsan to the north and Dongjak to the south, and crosses over the artificial island of Nodeulseom. The bridge carries eight lanes of traffic.

The Korea Meteorological Administration considers the Han to be frozen over when the 100-meter section of water between the second and fourth posts of the southern span freezes.

== History ==
Pontoon bridges were moored at the site of the modern bridge, but the Han had no fixed crossings until the nearby Hangang Railway Bridge was completed in 1900. Plans for a road bridge did not materialize until 1917, when the original footbridge (indogyo) opened. It was damaged by a flood in July 1925. In October 1935 a second span was constructed, and tram tracks added.

Shortly after the outbreak of the Korean War, South Korean troops bombed the bridge in an attempt to slow invading forces, as it was the river's solitary road crossing. The Hangang Bridge bombing killed between 500 and 1,000 people, mostly civilian refugees, who had not been informed of the plans to destroy the bridge. The bridge was not fully restored until 1954.

In 1982 additional lanes were added, and it was renamed Hangang Bridge.

== Gallery ==
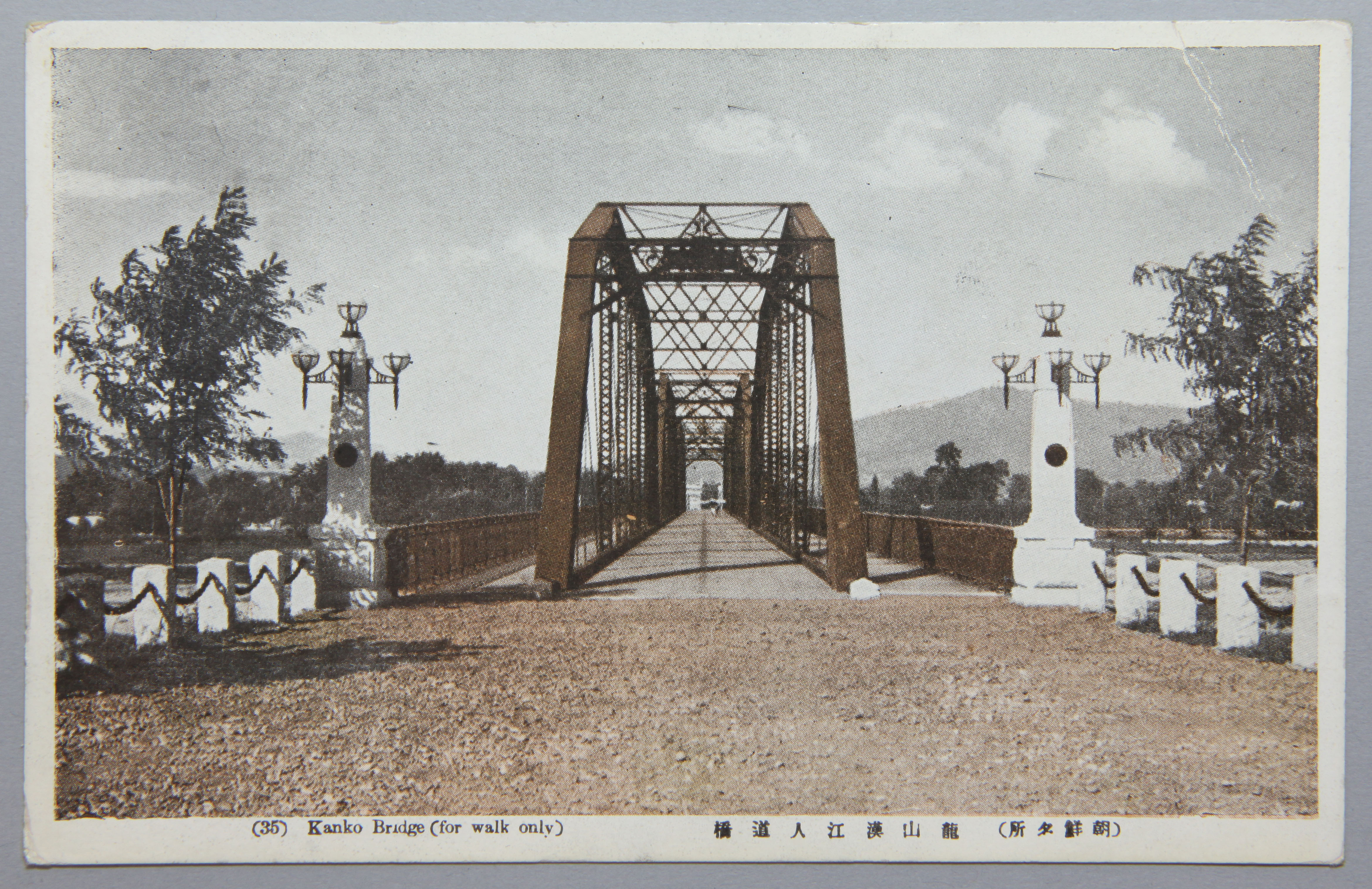
The pedestrian-only predecessor bridge (c. 1910s)

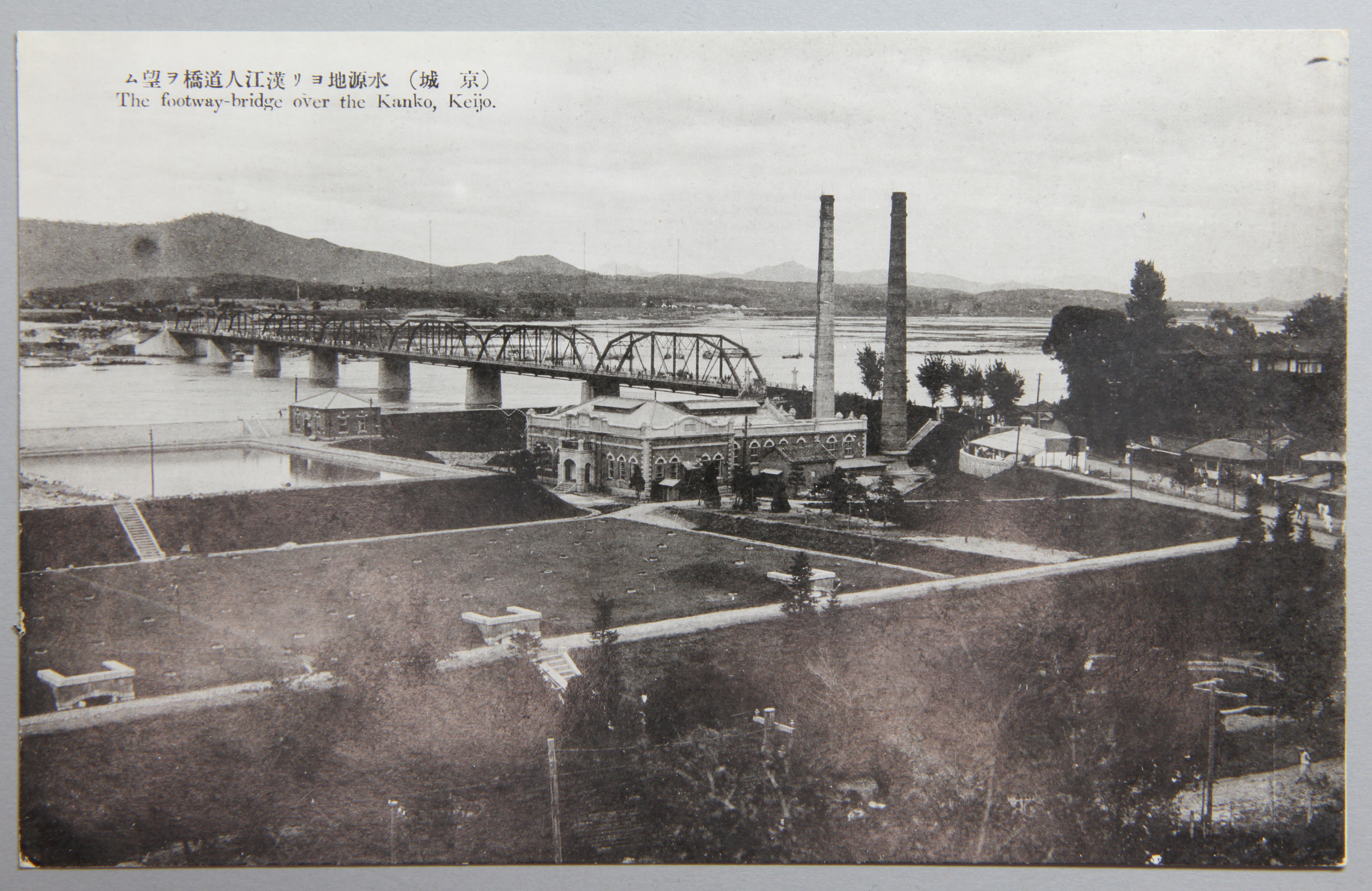
The bridge from the south bank of the river (c. 1920s)

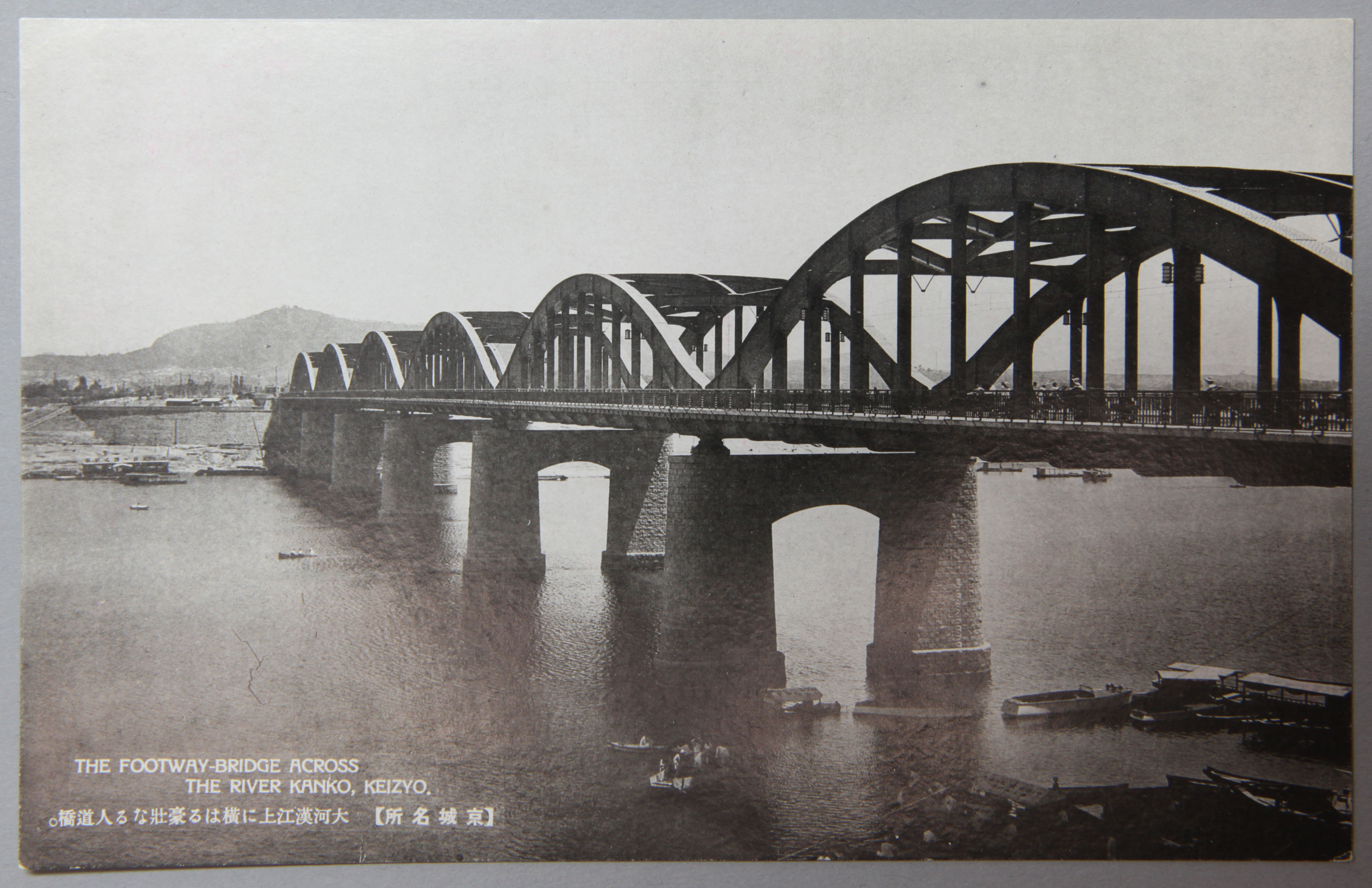
The bridge on a Japanese postcard (1937)

During a reopening ceremony for the bridge after the Korean War (1958)

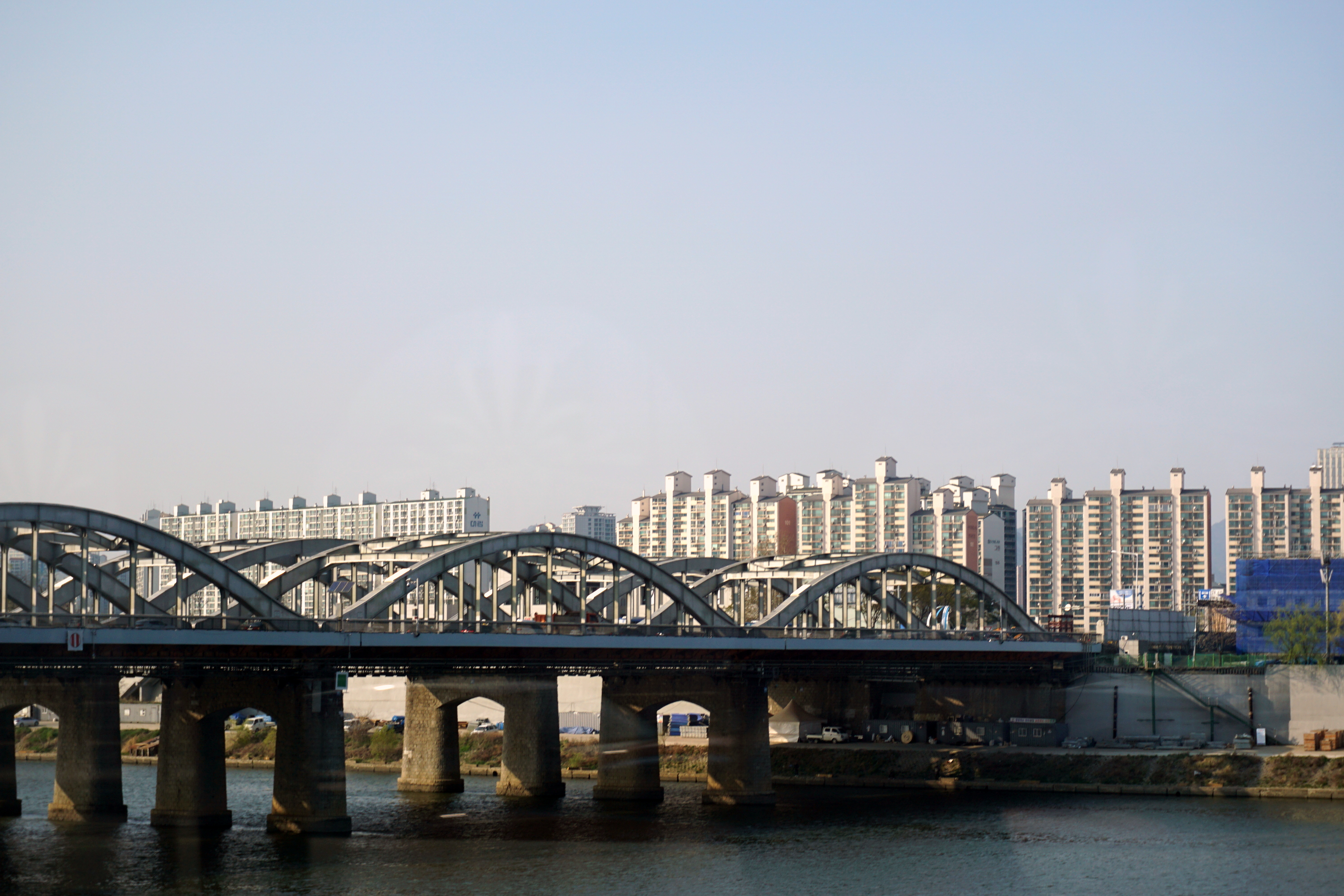
Sign with name of bridge at one end (2020)
