= Kim Suk-won =

Kim Suk-won (Korean: 김석원) is the name of:

- Kim Suk-won (general officer) (1893–1978), World War II military officer
- Kim Suk-won (entrepreneur) (1945–2023), businessman and scouting leader
- Kim Seok-won (footballer) (born 1961), South Korean footballer
