= Haguicheon =

River in South Korea

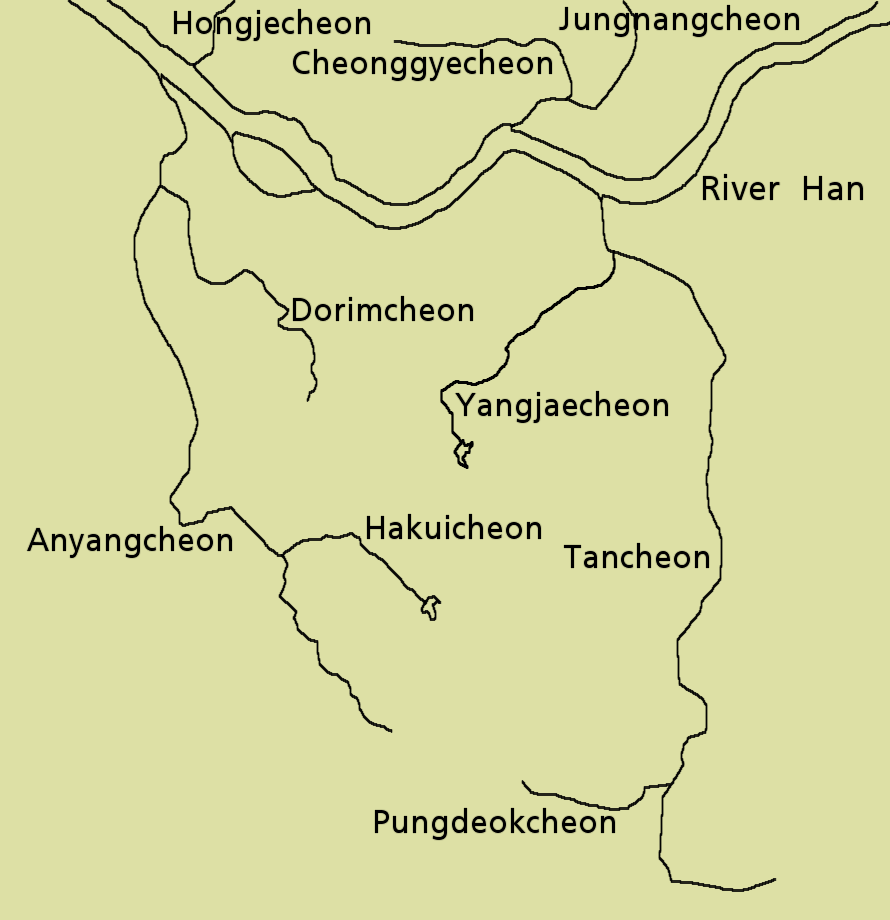
- Upstream from the confluence with the Anyangcheon

Korean name
- Hangul: 학의천
- Hanja: 鶴儀川
- RR: Haguicheon
- MR: Hagŭich'ŏn

Haguicheon (Korean: 학의천) is a river in Uiwang and Anyang, South Korea. It has its source on the slopes of Baekunsan in Uiwang, at the foot of which it forms Baekun Lake, from which it then flows west into Anyang, where it joins the Anyangcheon. The river has a path alongside providing easy access.

== Gallery ==
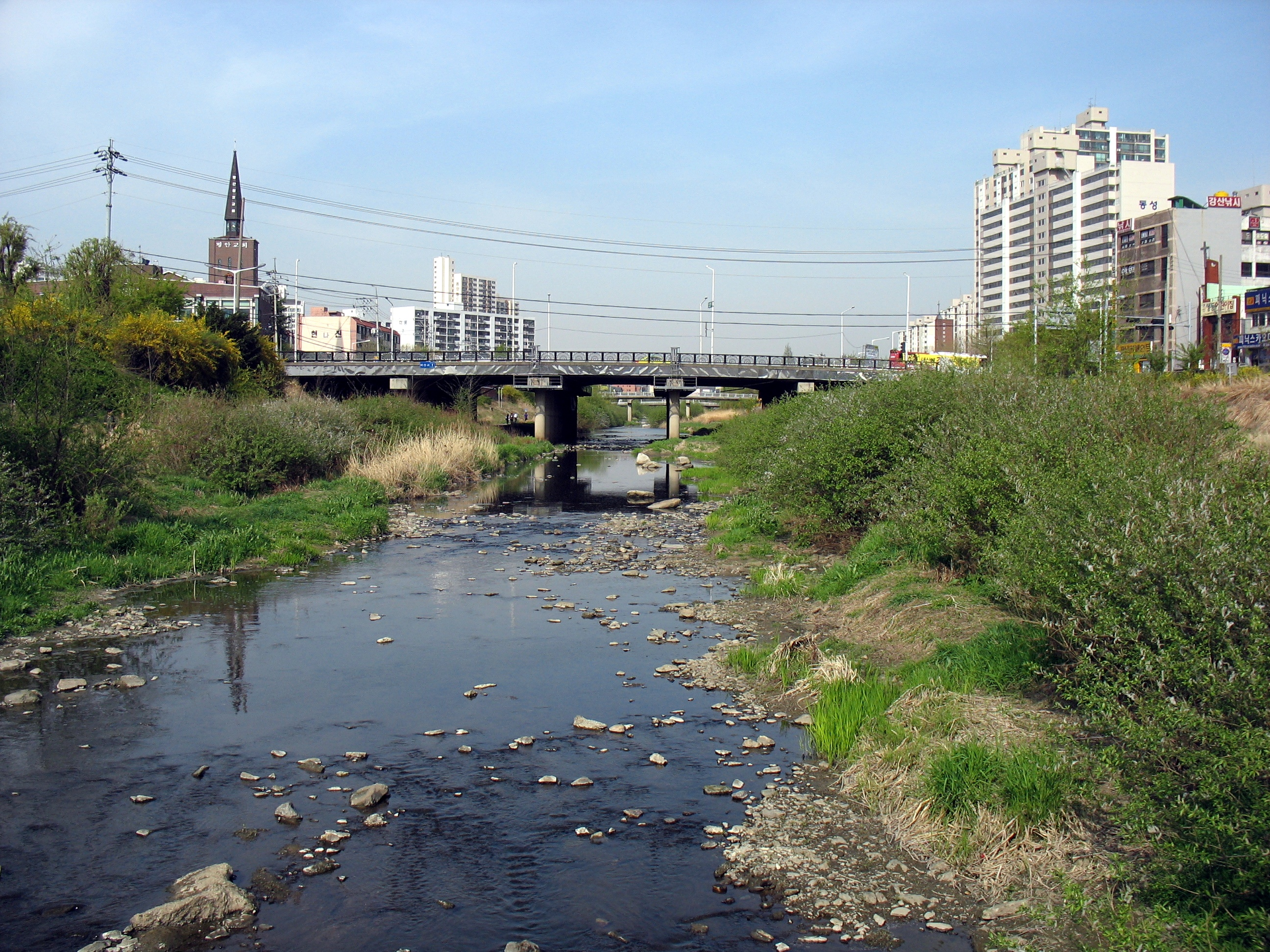
Upstream from the confluence with the Anyangcheon

== See also ==
- Rivers of Korea
- Geography of South Korea
