= Anyangcheon =

River in South Korea

Coordinates: 37°33′N 126°53′E

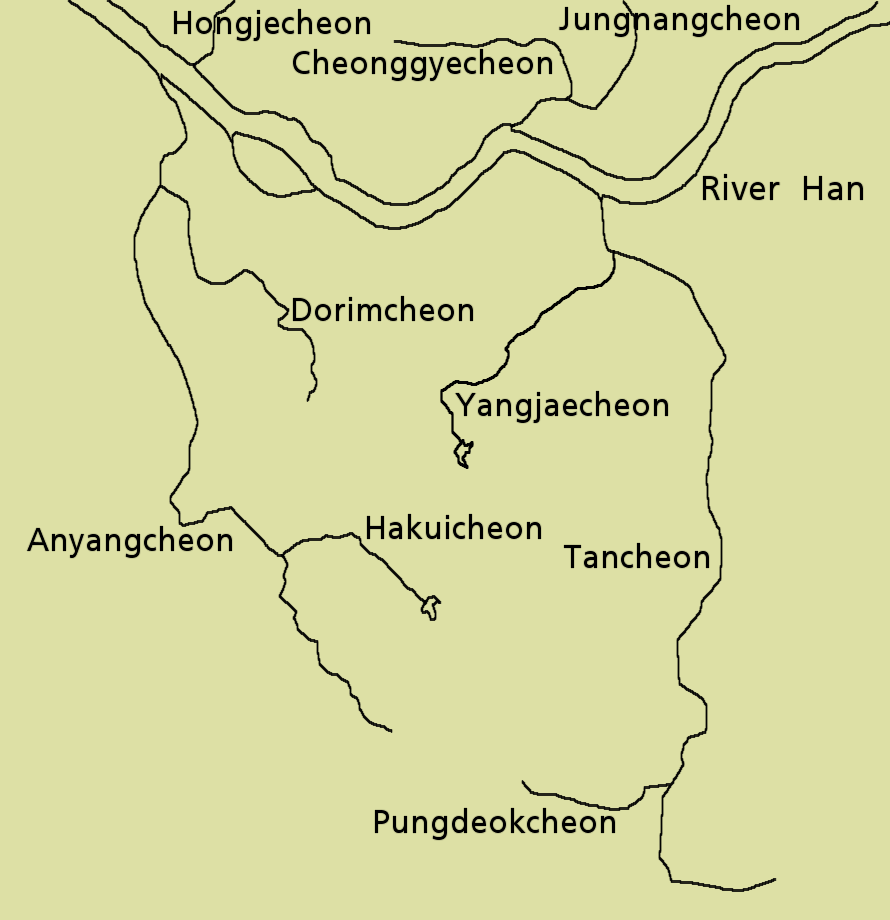

Korean name
- Hangul: 안양천
- Hanja: 安養川
- RR: Anyangcheon
- MR: Anyangch'ŏn

Anyangcheon (Korean: 안양천) is a river in Gyeonggi Province and Seoul, South Korea. Its source is on the slopes of Gwanggyosan in Uiwang and flows north, through the city of Gunpo, where a major cleanup operation saw several species of birds return to the area in 2005. Here, though, the water table remains depleted. The river then flows through Anyang, where it is met by its major tributary, the Hakuicheon stream. From here, it loops around to the west before continuing north to the border with Gwangmyeong. As the river passes to the west of the mountain Gwanaksan, it forms the border between Gwangmyeong and Seoul, where it is lined on the Gwangmyeong side with rape fields and cherry blossom trees. After the stream is joined near Guil Station from the west by the Mokgamcheon stream, which forms another border between Gwangmyeong and Seoul, it is then totally within the capital. Here, it is also joined from the east by the Dorimcheon and passes through a conservation zone for migratory birds which was established after a 2005 cleanup operation, whereafter it joins the Han. Most of the length of the river has a path alongside providing easy access, the only parts without this lying in Uiwang. Seoul City Council has embarked on a programme of exclusive cycle path creation alongside its waterways, including the Anyangcheon, to be completed in 2010.

== History ==
Anyangcheon has had many names throughout history. The part of the Anyangcheon that passes the modern day Geumcheon district was called Hannae in the book Donggukyeojiseungram, which was transcribed as 大川, meaning 'big river' in chinese. The river was also called Gitan, and the modern day name Anyang is said to be named after the temple Anyangsa which was near the source of the river. Other names include Hogye, and Geomamcheon.

== Wildlife ==
The Anyangcheon is home to a variety of wildlife. The dominant fish of the river are Zacco platypus (freshwater minnow) and Rhynchocypris oxycephalus in the more upstream areas near the source, and Carassius auratus (goldfish) further downstream, by Gwangmyeong. The river also houses a number of species of birds, including the egrets, the grey heron, northern shoveler, common teal and mallard. A conservation area has been established close to the confluence with the Han River, where the footpath is set back from the riverside to leave migratory birds a more natural setting.

== Gallery ==
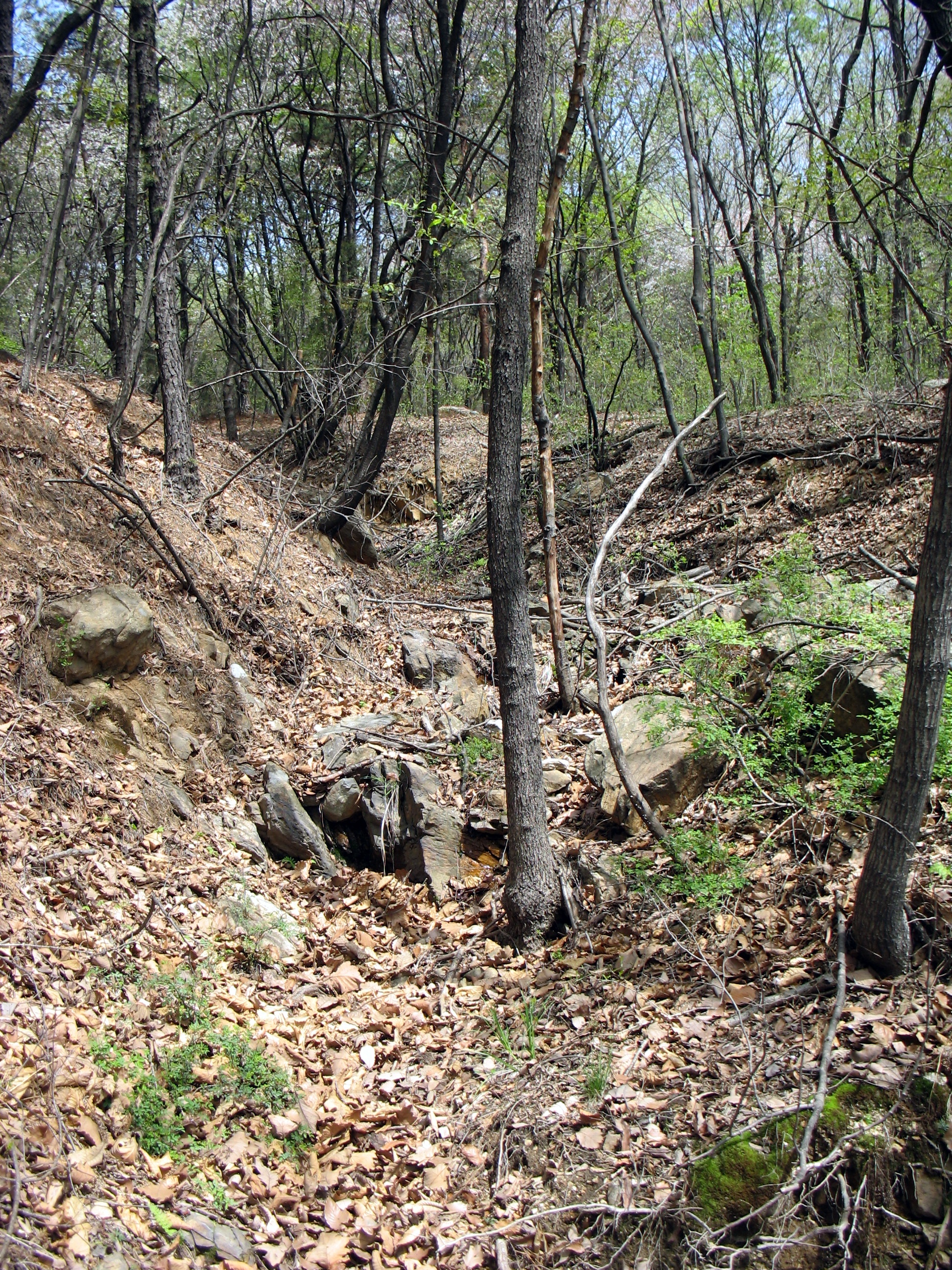
The source on the slopes of Gwanggyosan

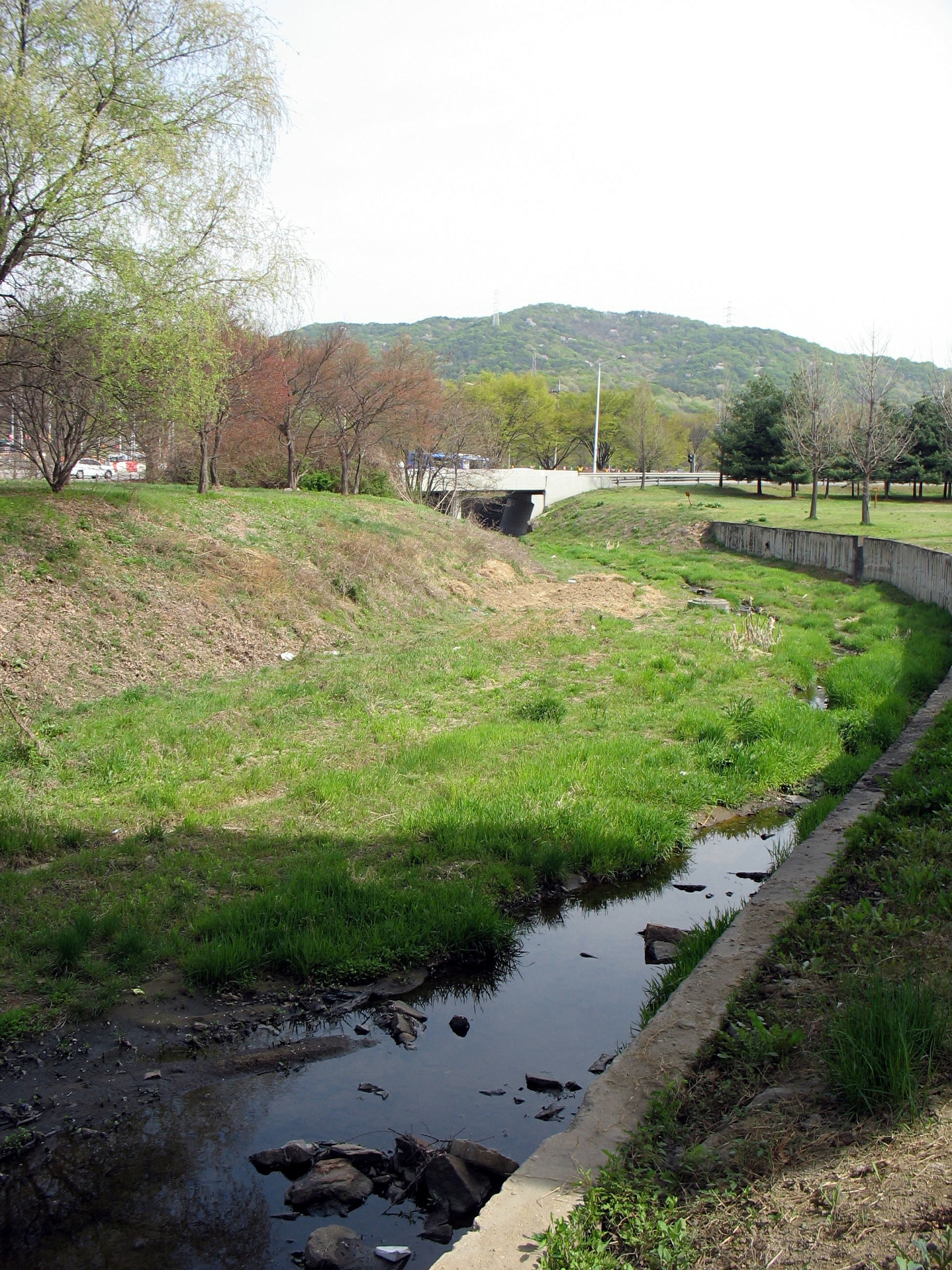
The far upper reaches by Uiwang I.C.

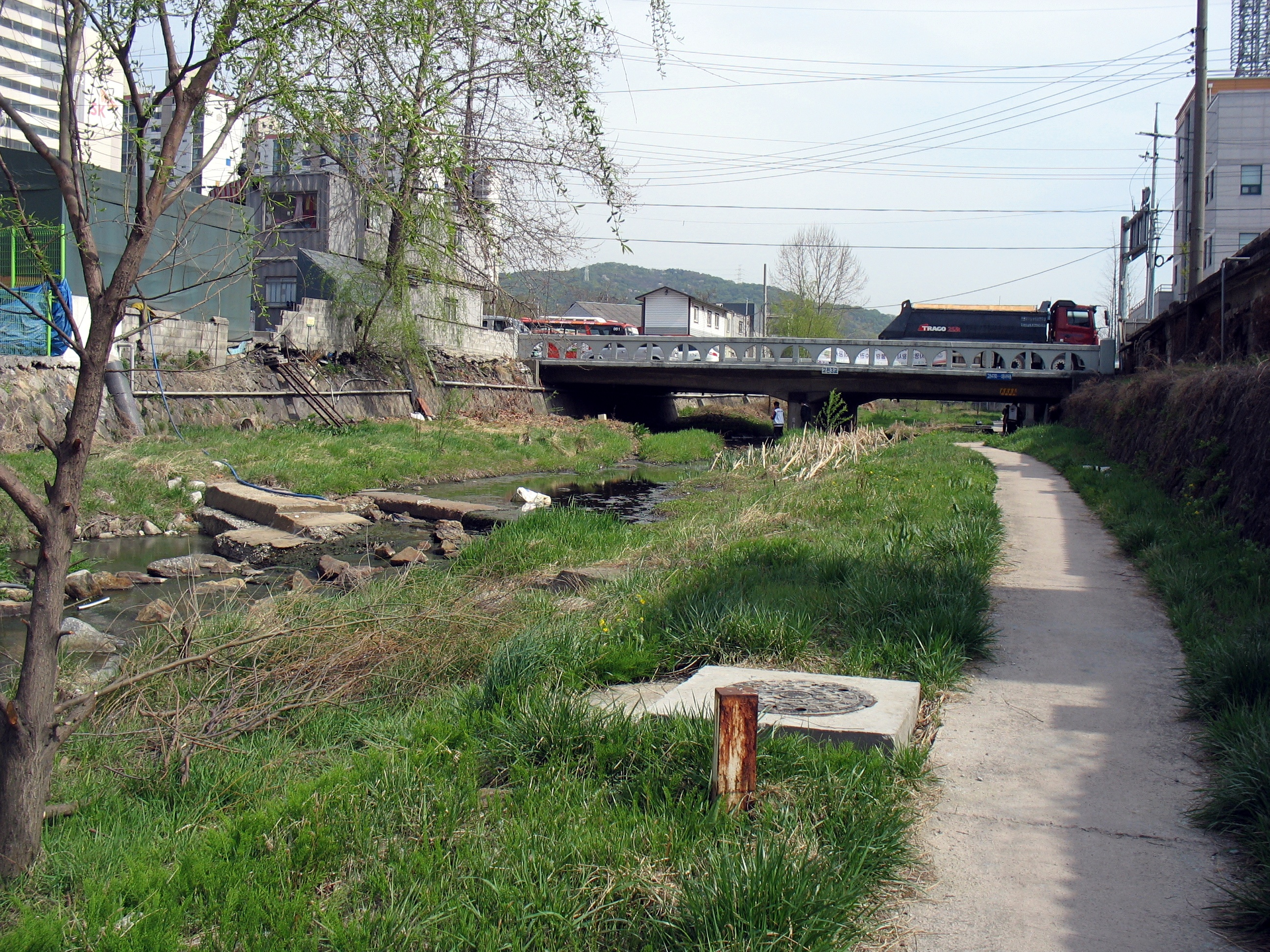
Looking upstream in Uiwang

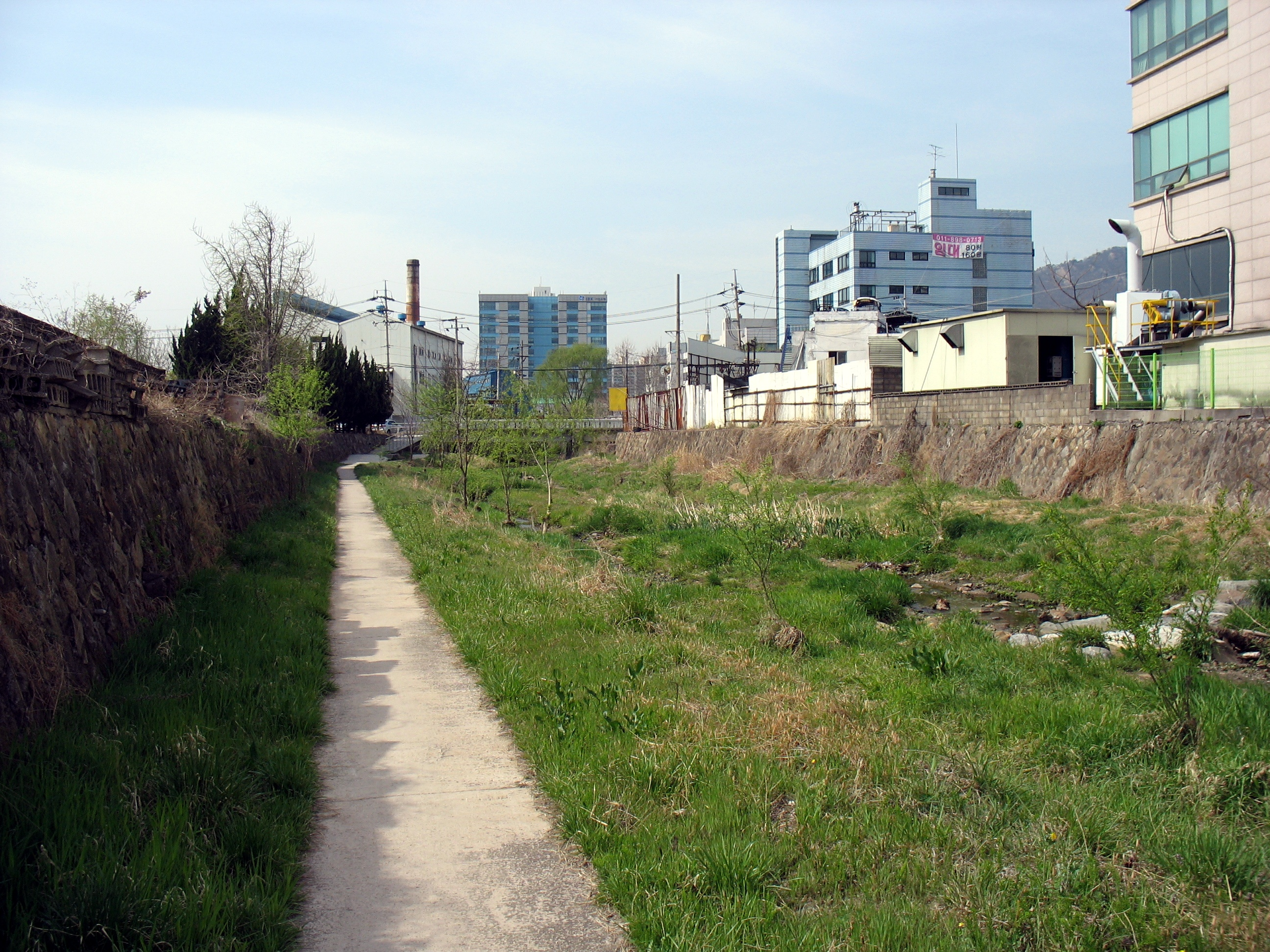
Looking downstream in Uiwang

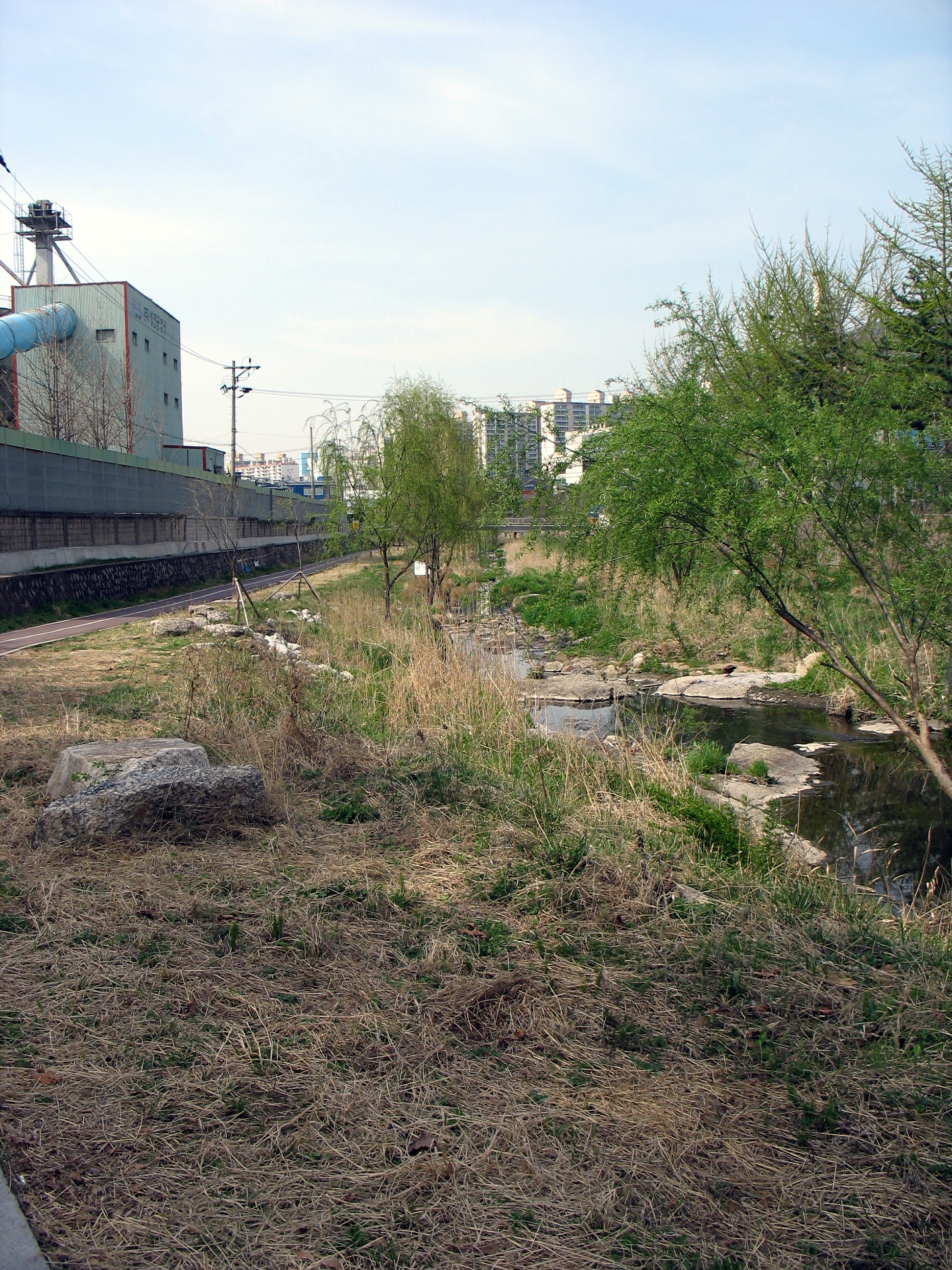
Looking downstream along the upper part in Gunpo

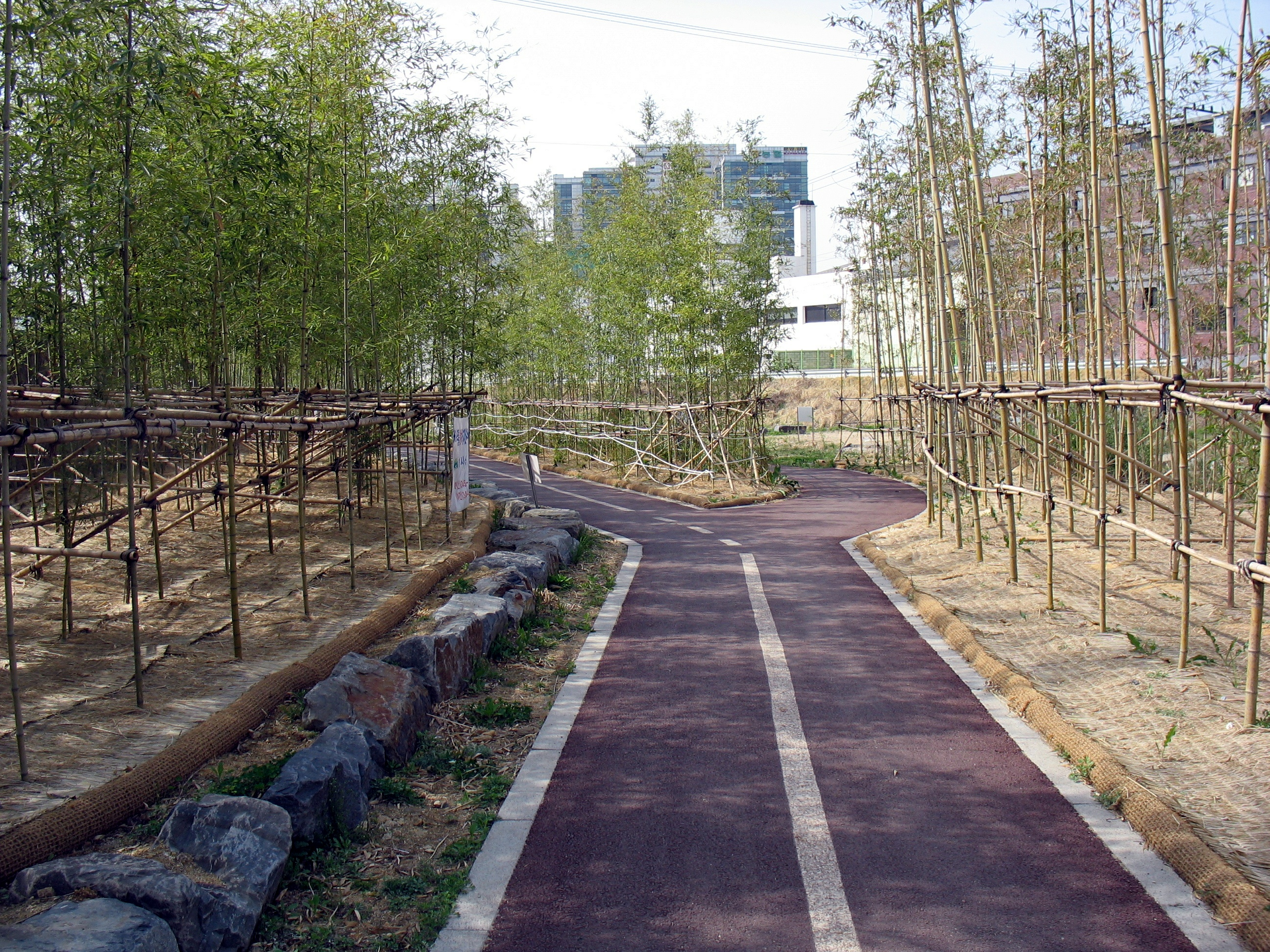
A bamboo-lined path beside the stream in Gunpo

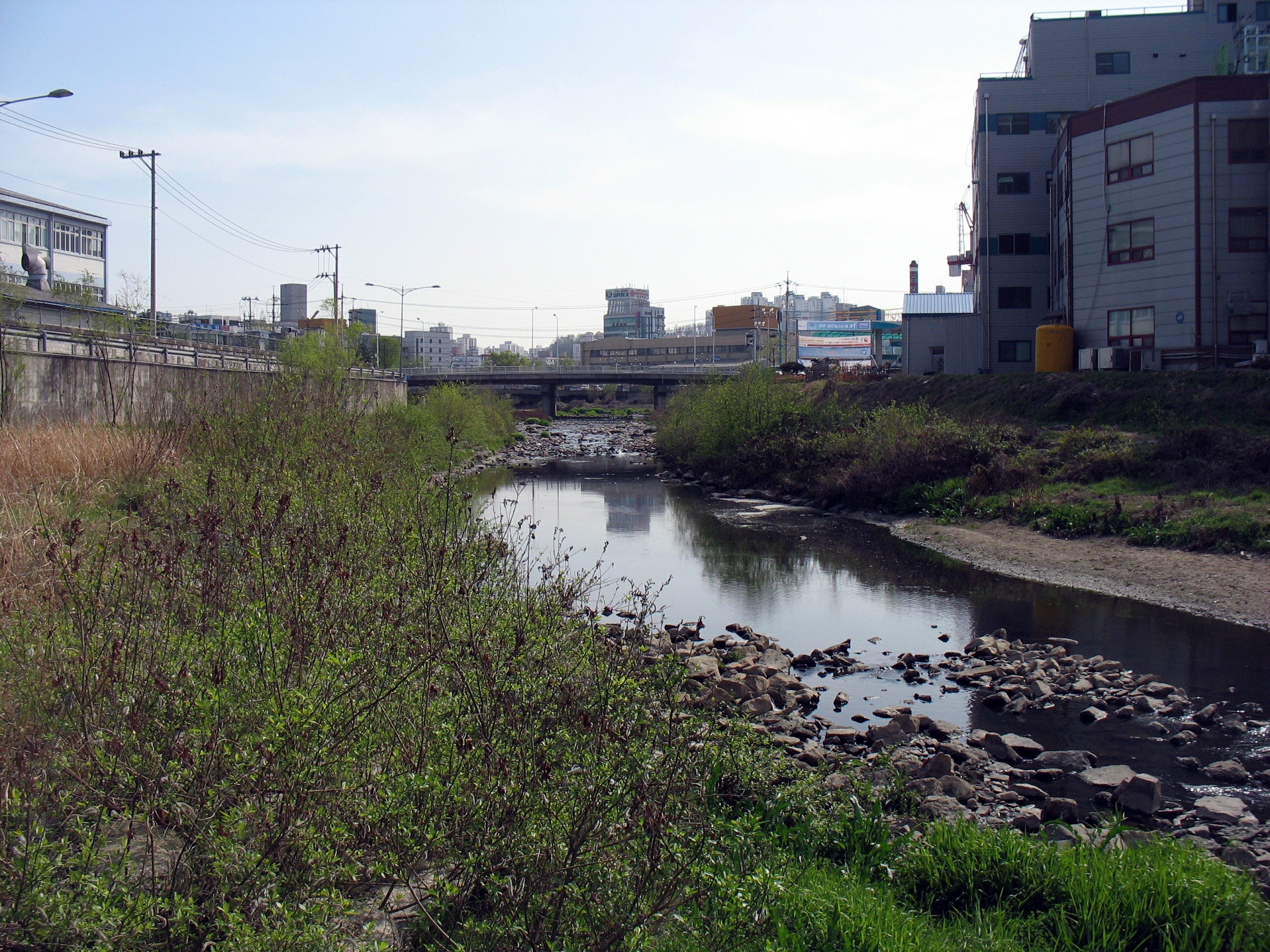
Looking upstream along a mid-width section in Uiwang

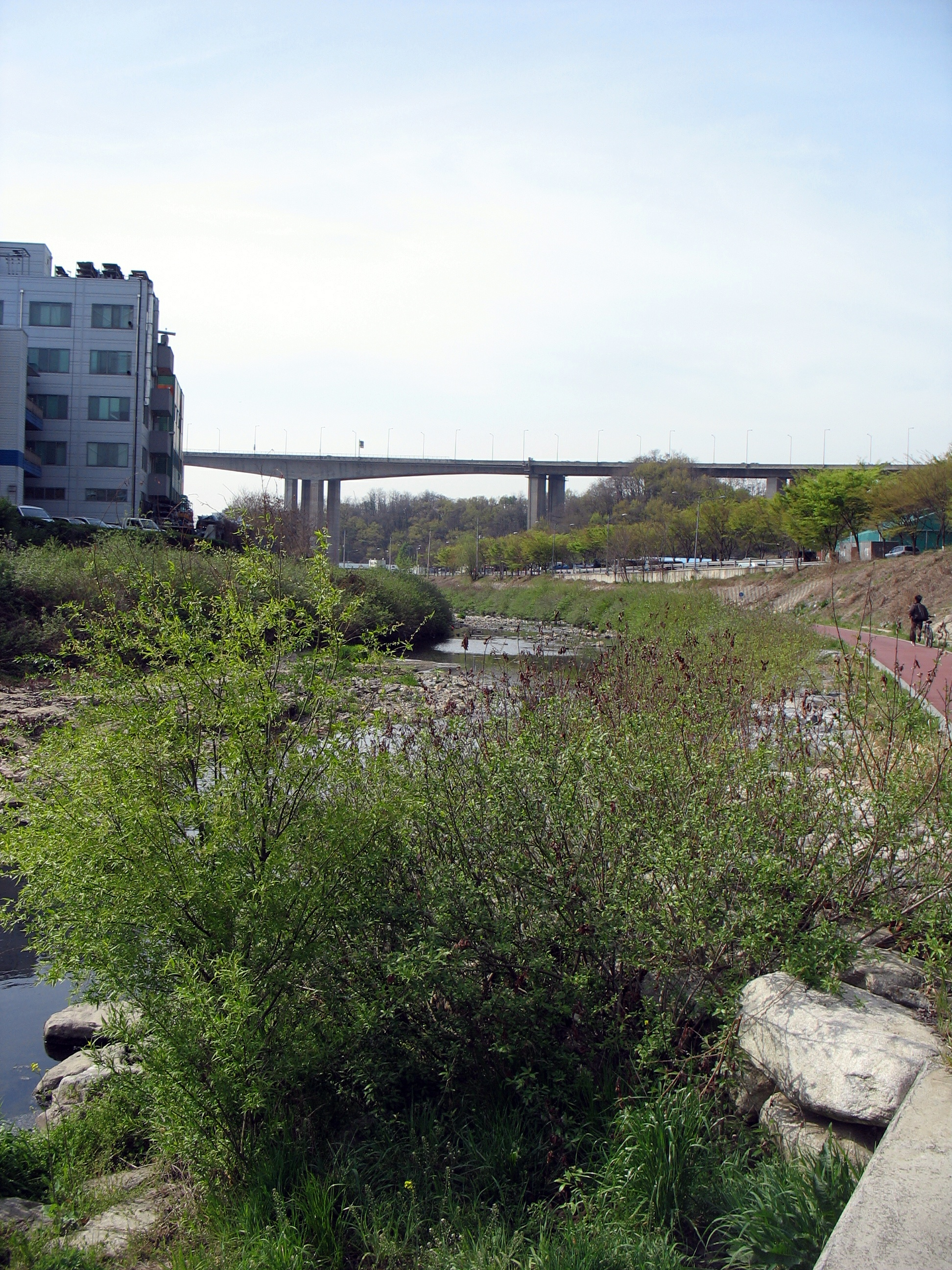
Looking downstream to the Capital Region First Ring Expressway

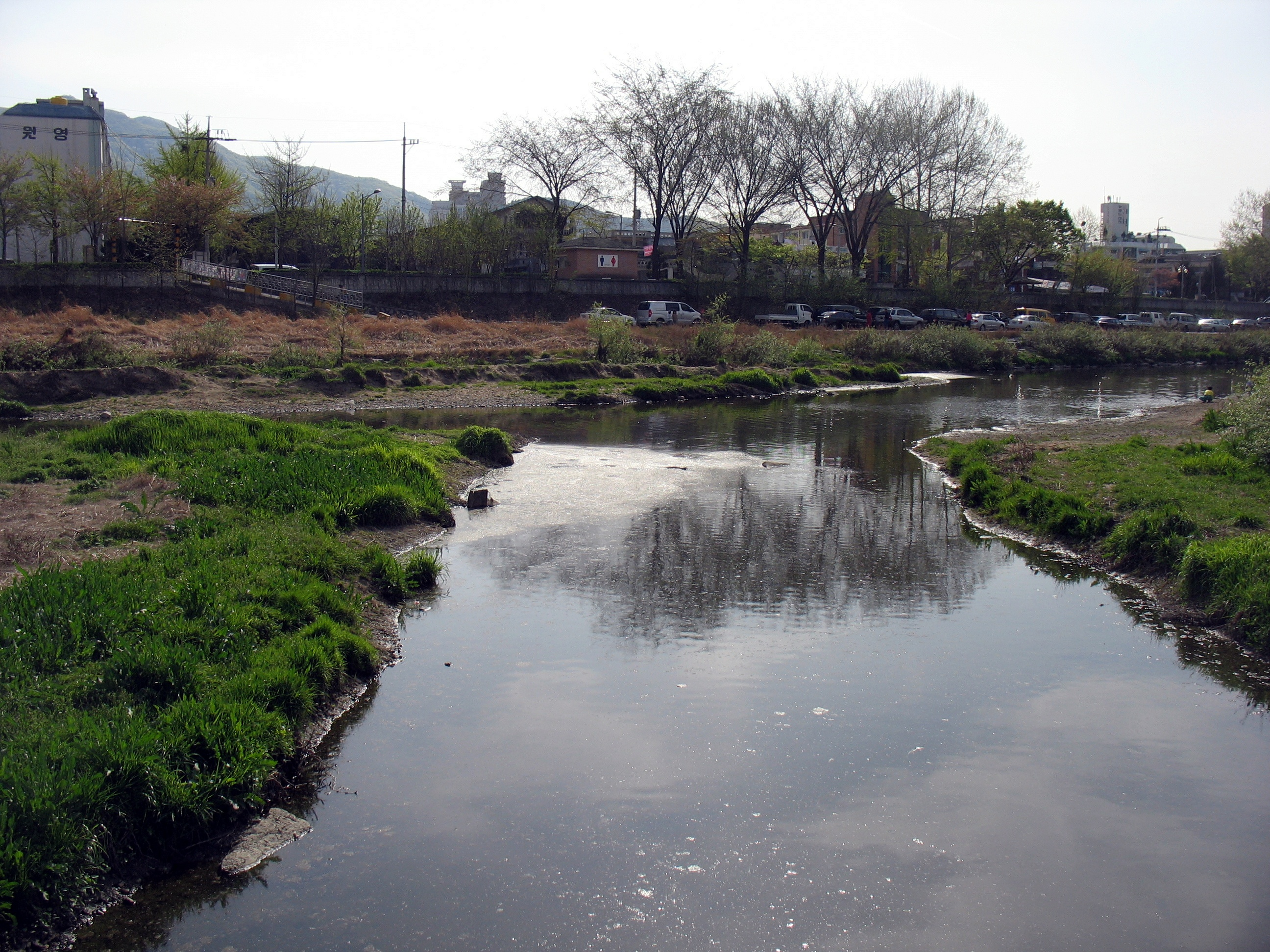
Looking downstream at the Anyangcheon from the end of the Hakuicheon

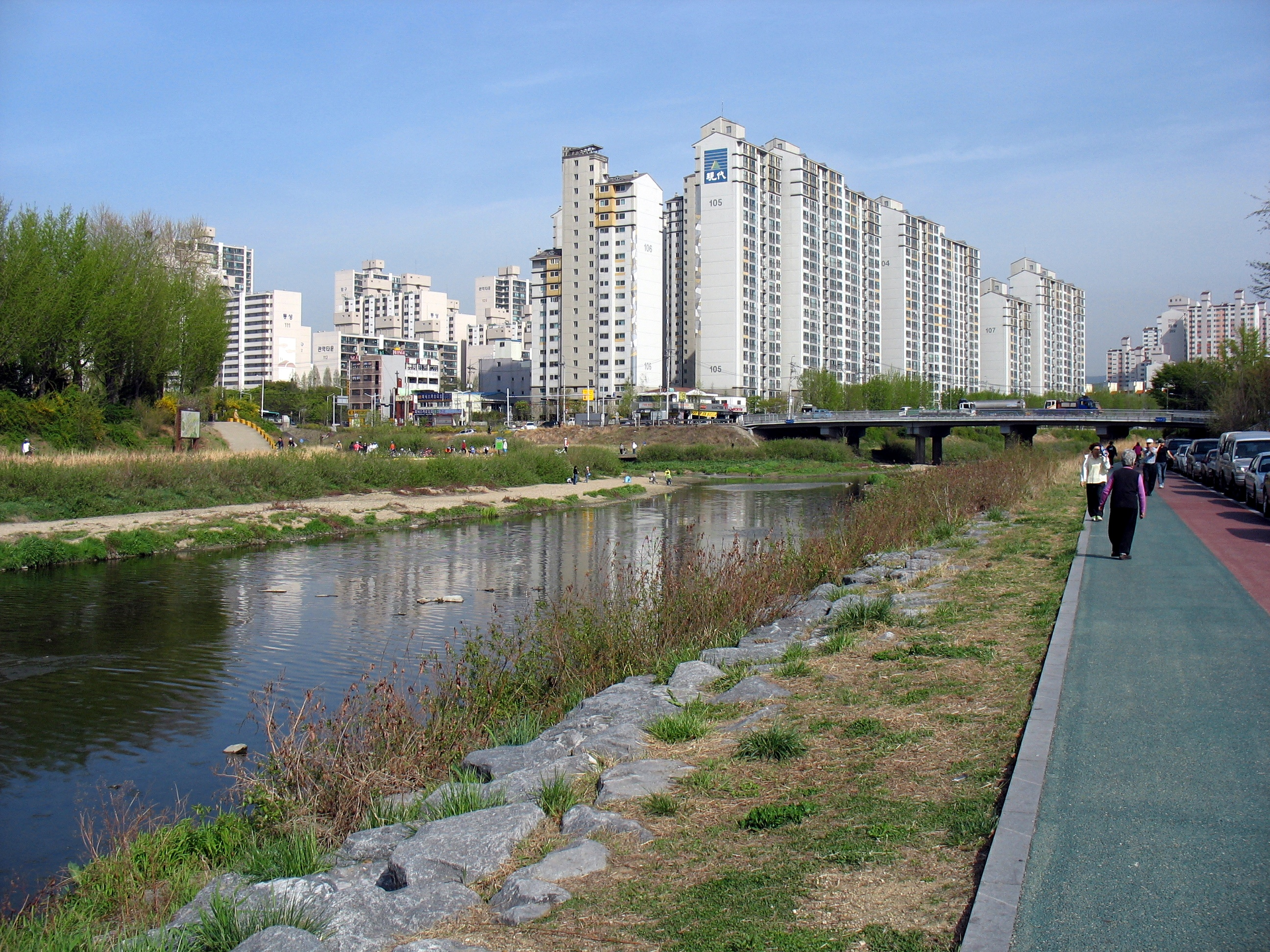
Looking upstream to the point of confluence with the Hakuicheon

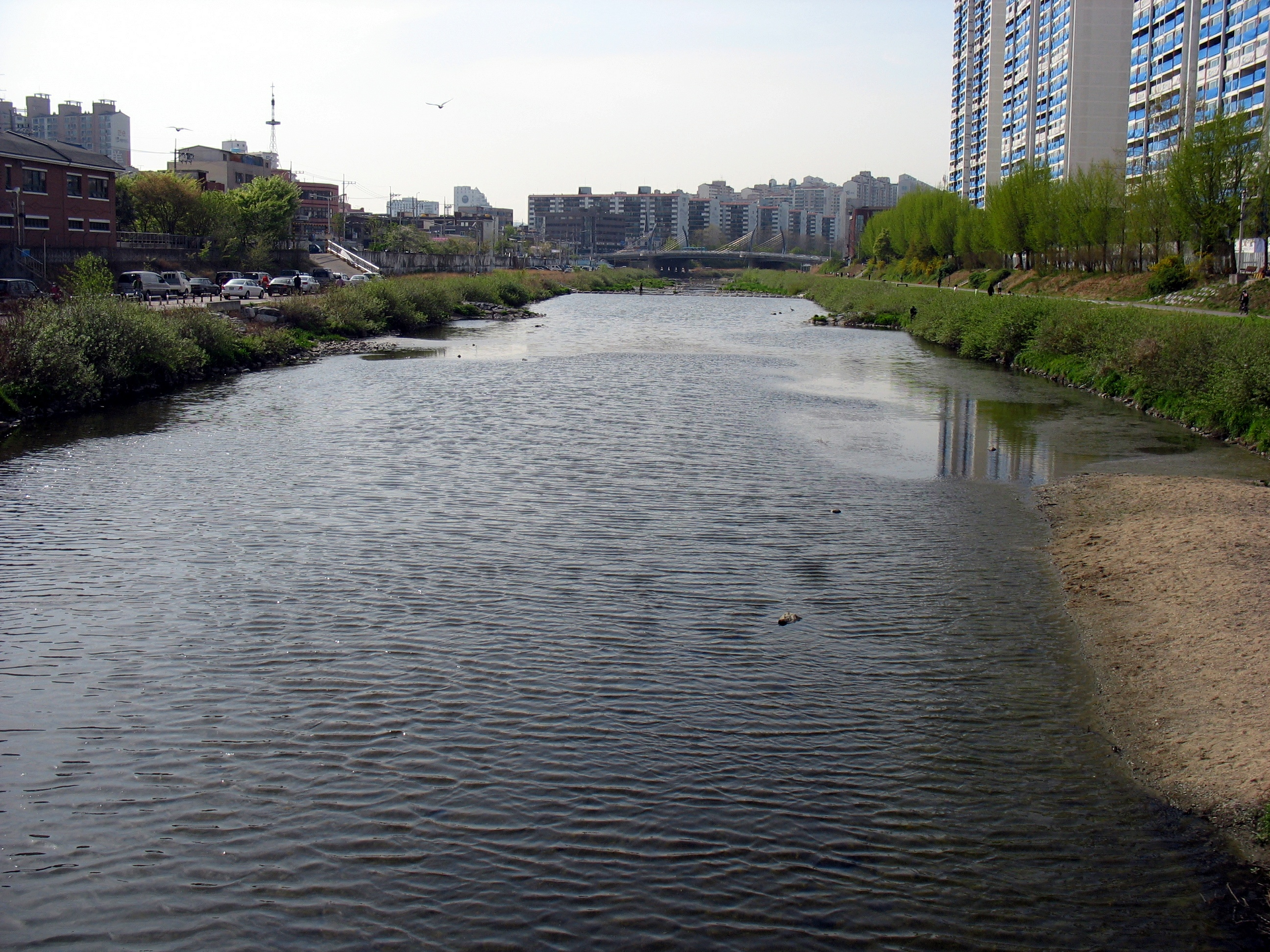
Downstream from the confluence with the Hakuicheon

== See also ==
- Rivers of Korea
- Geography of South Korea
