= List of mountains in South Korea =

The following is a list of mountains in South Korea:

== List of mountains in South Korea ==
=== Seoul ===
- Achasan (아차산;峨嵯山) – 287 meters (942 ft)
- Ansan (Seoul) (안산; 鞍山) - 295.5 metres (969 ft)
- Bukhansan (북한산; 北漢山) – 836.5 metres (2,744 ft)
- Buramsan (불암산; 佛岩山) – 507 metres (1,663 ft)
- Cheonggyesan (청계산; 淸溪山) – 620 metres (2,030 ft)
- Dobongsan (도봉산; 道峰山) – 739.5 metres (2,426 ft)
- Eungbongsan (응봉산; 應峰山) – 81 metres (266 ft)
- Gwanaksan (관악산; 冠岳山) – 632 metres (2,073 ft)
- Inwangsan (인왕산; 仁王山) – 338 metres (1,109 ft)
- Namsan (남산; 南山) – 262 metres (860 ft)
- Samseongsan (삼성산; 三聖山) – 481 metres (1,578 ft)
- Suraksan (수락산; 水落山) – 637.7 metres (2,092 ft)
- Yongmabong (용마봉; 龍馬峰)

=== Busan ===
- Geumjeongsan (금정산; 金井山) – 801.5 metres (2,630 ft)
- Jangsan (장산; 壯山) – 634 metres (2,080 ft)
- Seunghaksan (승학산; 乘鶴山) – 496 meters (1627 ft)

=== Daegu ===
- Choejeongsan (최정산; 最頂山) – 905 metres (2,969 ft)
- Gasan (가산; 假山) – 901.6 metres (2,958 ft)
- Palgongsan (팔공산;八公山) 1,193 metres (3,914 ft), not to be confused with mountain of Jeollabukdo with same name.

=== Incheon ===
- Goryeosan (고려산; 高麗山) – 436 metres (1,430 ft)
- Gyeyangsan (계양산;桂陽山) – 395 metres (1,296 ft)
- Haemyeongsan (해명산; 海明山) – 309 metres (1,014 ft)
- Horyonggoksan (호룡곡산; 虎龍谷山) – 246 metres (807 ft)
- Manisan (마니산; 摩尼山) – 469.4 metres (1,540 ft)
- Nakgasan (낙가산; 落袈山) – 235 metres (771 ft)
- Sangbongsan (상봉산; 上峰山) – 316 metres (1,037 ft)

=== Gwangju ===
- Mudeungsan (무등산; 無等山) – 1,187 metres (3,894 ft)

=== Daejeon ===
- Gyejoksan (계족산; 鷄足山) – 429 metres (1,407 ft)
- Gyeryongsan (계룡산; 鷄龍山) – 845 metres (2,772 ft)
- Jangtaesan (장태산; 長泰山) – 471 metres (1,545 ft)
- Sikjangsan (식장산; 食藏山) – 596 metres (1,955 ft)

=== Ulsan ===
- Baekunsan (백운산; 白雲山) – 885 metres (2,904 ft)
- Cheonhwangsan (천황산; 天皇山) – 1,189 metres (3,901 ft)
- Daeunsan (대운산; 大雲山) – 742 metres (2,434 ft).
- Dongdaesan (동대산) – 447 metres (1,467 ft)
- Gajisan (가지산; 迦智山) – 1,240 metres (4,070 ft)
- Ganwolsan (간월산; 肝月山) – 1,083.1 metres (3,553 ft)
- Goheonsan (고헌산; 高獻山) – 1,032 metres (3,386 ft)
- Hamwolsan (함월산) – 200 metres (660 ft)
- Hwajangsan(화장산; 南巖山) – 285 metres (935 ft)
- Jaeyaksan (재약산; 載藥山) – 1,108 metres (3,635 ft)
- Munsusan (문수산; 文水山) – 543 metres (1,781 ft)
- Muryongsan (무룡산; 舞龍山) – 452 metres (1,483 ft)
- Namamsan (남암산; 南巖山) – 600 metres (2,000 ft)
- Sinbulsan (신불산; 神佛山) – 1,209 metres (3,967 ft)
- Yeomposan (염포산) – 203 metres (666 ft)
- Yeongchuksan (영축산; 靈鷲山) – 1,081 metres (3,547 ft)
- Yeonhwasan (연화산; 蓮花山) – 532 metres (1,745 ft)

=== Gyeonggi Province ===
- Baegunbong (백운봉; 白雲峰) – 940 metres (3,080 ft)
- Baegunsan (백운산; 白雲山) – 904.4 metres (2,967 ft)
- Baegunsan (백운산; 白雲山) – 567 metres (1,860 ft)
- Baekdunbong (백둔봉; 柏屯峰) – 974 metres (3,196 ft)
- Bakdalbong (박달봉; 朴達峰) – 810 metres (2,660 ft)
- Bukhansan (북한산; 北漢山) – 836.5 metres (2,744 ft)
- Bulgisan (불기산; 佛岐山) – 610 metres (2,000 ft)
- Bulgoksan (불곡산; 佛谷山) – 468.7 metres (1,538 ft)
- Bulgoksan (불곡산; 佛谷山) – 345 metres (1,132 ft) (Note: Altitude of this mountain is not accurate. Every reporters report different altitude. Now there are reported different altitude for this mountain. 313m, 325m, 335m, 344m, 345m. At here, we adopted the highest altitude)
- Buramsan (불암산; 佛岩山) – 468.7 metres (1,538 ft)
- Cheonbosan (천보산; 天寶山) – 336.8 metres (1,105 ft)
- Cheonggyesan (청계산; 淸溪山) – 620 metres (2,030 ft)
- Cheonggyesan (청계산; 淸溪山) – 658.4 metres (2,160 ft)
- Cheonggyesan (청계산; 淸溪山) – 849 metres (2,785 ft)
- Cheongwusan (청우산; 靑雨山) – 619 metres (2,031 ft)
- Cheonmasan (천마산; 天摩山) – 810.2 metres (2,658 ft)
- Chilbosan (칠보산; 七寶山) – 238 metres (781 ft)
- Chokdaebong (촉대봉; 燭臺峯) – 1,125 metres (3,691 ft)
- Chungnyungsan (축령산; 祝靈山) – 879 metres (2,884 ft)
- Daegeumsan (대금산; 大金山) – 704 metres (2,310 ft)
- Danwolbong (단월봉; 丹月峰) – 778 metres (2,552 ft)
- Dobongsan (도봉산; 道峰山) – 739.5 metres (2,426 ft)
- Dodeuramsan (도드람산; 도드람山) – 394 metres (1,293 ft)
- Doilbong (도일봉; 道一峰) – 864 metres (2,835 ft)
- Eobisan (어비산; 魚飛山) – 828 metres (2,717 ft)
- Gadeoksan (가덕산; 加德山) – 858 metres (2,815 ft)
- Gakkeulsan (각흘산; 角屹山) – 838 metres (2,749 ft)
- Galgisan (갈기산; 葛基山) – 685 metres (2,247 ft)
- Gamaksan (감악산; 紺岳山) – 675 metres (2,215 ft)
- Gangssibong (강씨봉; 姜氏峰) – 830 metres (2,720 ft)
- Garisan (가리산; 加里山) – 774.3 metres (2,540 ft)
- Geomdansan (검단산; 黔丹山) – 657 metres (2,156 ft)
- Geomdansan (검단산; 黔丹山) – 534.7 metres (1,754 ft)
- Geumjusan (금주산; 金珠山) – 569.2 metres (1,867 ft)
- Geummulsan (금물산; 今勿山) – 791 metres (2,595 ft)
- Godaesan (고대산; 高大山) – 832 metres (2,730 ft)
- Godongsan (고동산; 古桐山) – 600 metres (2,000 ft)
- Gokdalsan (곡달산; 鵠達山) – 628 metres (2,060 ft)
- Goraesan (고래산; 고래山) – 542.5 metres (1,780 ft)
- Gunamusan (구나무산; 구나무山) – 859 metres (2,818 ft)
- Gungmangbong (국망봉; 國望峰) – 1,168 metres (3,832 ft)
- Gwanaksan (관악산; 冠岳山) – 632 metres (2,073 ft)
- Gwaneumsan (관음산; 觀音山) – 733 metres (2,405 ft)
- Gwangdeoksan (광덕산; 廣德山) – 1,046 metres (3,432 ft)
- Gwanggyosan (광교산; 光橋山) – 582 metres (1,909 ft)
- Gwimokbong (귀목봉; 鬼木峰) – 1,036 metres (3,399 ft)
- Gyegwansan (계관산; 鷄冠山) – 665.4 metres (2,183 ft)
- Hamwangbong (함왕봉; 咸王峰) – 947 metres (3,107 ft)
- Homyeongsan (호명산; 虎鳴山) – 632 metres (2,073 ft)
- Hwaaksan (화악산; 華岳山) – 1,468.3 metres (4,817 ft)
- Hwayasan (화야산; 禾也山) – 755 metres (2,477 ft)
- Jijangbong (지장봉; 地藏峰) – 877.2 metres (2,878 ft)
- Jongjasan (종자산; 種子山) – 643 metres (2,110 ft)
- Jugeumsan (주금산; 鑄錦山) – 814 metres (2,671 ft)
- Jungwonsan (중원산; 中元山) – 800 metres (2,600 ft)
- Mindungsan (민둥산; 민둥山) – 1,023 metres (3,356 ft)
- Myeongjisan (명지산; 明智山) – 1,267 metres (4,157 ft)
- Myeongseongsan (명성산; 鳴聲山) – 922.6 metres (3,027 ft)
- Namhansan (남한산; 南漢山) – 460 metres (1,510 ft)
- Samseongsan (삼성산; 三聖山) – 481 metres (1,578 ft)
- Sanghaebong (상해봉; 上海峰) – 1,010 metres (3,310 ft)
- Sangsan (상산; 霜山) – 825 metres (2,707 ft)
- Seongjisan (성지산; 聖芝山) – 791 metres (2,595 ft)
- Seongnyongsan (석룡산; 石龍山) – 1,150 metres (3,770 ft)
- Seounsan (서운산; 瑞雲山) – 547.7 metres (1,797 ft)
- Sorisan (소리산; 小理山) – 479.2 metres (1,572 ft)
- Soyosan (소요산; 逍遙山) – 587 metres (1,926 ft)
- Sudeoksan (수덕산; 修德山) – 794 metres (2,605 ft)
- Suraksan (수락산; 水落山) – 637.7 metres (2,092 ft)
- Taehwasan (태화산; 太華山) – 641 metres (2,103 ft)
- Udusan (우두산; 牛頭山) – 473 metres (1,552 ft)
- Unaksan (운악산; 雲岳山) – 935.5 metres (3,069 ft)
- Ungilsan (운길산; 雲吉山) – 610.2 metres (2,002 ft)
- Wangbangsan (왕방산; 旺方山) – 737 metres (2,418 ft)
- Yebongsan (예봉산; 禮蜂山) – 683.2 metres (2,241 ft)
- Yeoninsan (연인산; 戀人山) – 1,068 metres (3,504 ft)
- Yongmunsan (용문산; 龍門山) – 1,157.2 metres (3,797 ft)
- Yumyeongsan (유명산; 有明山) – 862 metres (2,828 ft)

=== Gangwon Province ===
- Amisan (아미산; 娥眉山) – 960.8 metres (3,152 ft)
- Ansan (Gangwon) (안산; 鞍山) – 1,430 metres (4,690 ft)
- Baegamsan (백암산; 百岩山) – 1,099 metres (3,606 ft)
- Baegusan (백우산; 白羽山) – 894.7 metres (2,935 ft)
- Baegunsan (백운산; 白雲山) – 882.6 metres (2,896 ft)
- Baegunsan (백운산; 白雲山) – 904.4 metres (2,967 ft)
- Baegunsan (백운산; 白雲山) – 1,085.7 metres (3,562 ft)
- Baekbyeongsan (백병산; 白屛山) – 1,259.3 metres (4,132 ft)
- Baekdeoksan (백덕산; 白德山) – 1,350 metres (4,430 ft)
- Baekseoksan (백석산; 白石山) – 1,364.6 metres (4,477 ft)
- Bakjisan (박지산; 博芝山) – 1,394 metres (4,573 ft)
- Balgyosan (발교산; 髮校山) – 998 metres (3,274 ft)
- Balwangsan (발왕산; 發旺山) – 1,458.1 metres (4,784 ft)
- Banamsan (반암산; 盤岩山) – 832 metres (2,730 ft)
- Bangtaesan (방태산; 芳台山) – 1,444 metres (4,738 ft)
- Bawisan (바위산; None) – 858 metres (2,815 ft)
- Bokgyesan (복계산; 福桂山) – 1,054 metres (3,458 ft)
- Bokjusan (복주산; 伏主山) – 1,152 metres (3,780 ft)
- Bongboksan (봉복산; 鳳腹山) – 1,019 metres (3,343 ft)
- Bonghwasan (봉화산; 峰火山) – 487 metres (1,598 ft)
- Boraebong (보래봉; 寶來峰) – 1,324.3 metres (4,345 ft)
- Buyongsan (부용산; 芙蓉山) – 882 metres (2,894 ft)
- Cheongoksan (청옥산; 靑玉山) – 1,255.7 metres (4,120 ft)
- Cheongoksan (청옥산; 靑玉山) – 1,403.7 metres (4,605 ft)
- Cheonjibong (천지봉; 天地峰) – 1,087 metres (3,566 ft)
- Chiaksan (치악산; 雉岳山) – 1,288 metres (4,226 ft)
- Chokdaebong (촉대봉; 燭臺峯) – 1,125 metres (3,691 ft)
- Daeamsan (대암산; 大岩山) – 1,304 metres (4,278 ft)
- Daebawisan (대바위산; 大바위山) – 1,091.4 metres (3,581 ft)
- Daedeoksan (대덕산; 大德山) – 1,307 metres (4,288 ft)
- Daemisan (대미산; 大美山) – 1,243.4 metres (4,079 ft)
- Daeseongsan (대성산; 大成山) – 1,175 metres (3,855 ft)
- Dalgibong (닭이봉; 鷄峰) – 1,028 metres (3,373 ft)
- Daraksan (다락산; 多樂山) – 1,018 metres (3,340 ft)
- Deokgasan (덕가산; 德加山) – 832 metres (2,730 ft)
- Deokgosan (덕고산; 德高山) – 1,125 metres (3,691 ft)
- Deokhangsan (덕항산; 德項山) – 1,070.7 metres (3,513 ft)
- Deoksusan (덕수산; 德修山) – 1,000.2 metres (3,281 ft)
- Dongdaesan (동대산; 東臺山) – 1,433.5 metres (4,703 ft)
- Durobong (두로봉; 頭老峰) – 1,421.9 metres (4,665 ft)
- Duryusan (두류산; 頭流山) – 993 metres (3,258 ft)
- Dutasan (두타산; 頭陀山) – 1,352.7 metres (4,438 ft)
- Duwibong (두위봉; 斗圍峰) – 1,465.9 metres (4,809 ft)
- Eodapsan (어답산; 御踏山) – 789 metres (2,589 ft)
- Eungbongsan (응봉산; 應峰山) – 1,359.6 metres (4,461 ft)
- Eungbongsan (응봉산; 應峰山) – 1,013 metres (3,323 ft)
- Eungbongsan (응봉산; 應峰山) – 1,094.9 metres (3,592 ft)
- Eungbongsan (응봉산; 應峰山) – 1,103.3 metres (3,620 ft)
- Eungbongsan (응봉산; 應峰山) – 999 metres (3,278 ft)
- Gachilbong (가칠봉; 加七峰) – 1,240.4 metres (4,070 ft)
- Gachilbong (가칠봉; 加漆峰) – 1,164 metres (3,819 ft)
- Gadeoksan (가덕산; 加德山) – 858 metres (2,815 ft)
- Gadeukbong (가득봉; 可得峰) – 1,059.7 metres (3,477 ft)
- Gaeinsan (개인산; 開仁山) – 1,341 metres (4,400 ft)
- Gakkeulsan (각흘산; 角屹山) – 838 metres (2,749 ft)
- Gamabong (가마봉; 加馬峰) – 1,191.5 metres (3,909 ft)
- Gamaksan (감악산; 紺岳山) – 886 metres (2,907 ft)
- Garibong (가리봉; 加里峰) – 1,518.5 metres (4,982 ft)
- Garisan (가리산; 加里山) – 1,050.7 metres (3,447 ft)
- Gariwangsan (가리왕산; 加里王山) – 1,560.6 metres (5,120 ft)
- Geombongsan (검봉산; 劍峰山) – 530.2 metres (1,740 ft)
- Geomunsan (거문산; 巨文山) – 1,175 metres (3,855 ft)
- Geumdaebong (금대봉; 金臺峰) – 1,408.1 metres (4,620 ft)
- Geumdangsan (금당산; 金堂山) – 1,173 metres (3,848 ft)
- Geumhaksan (금학산; 金鶴山) – 947 metres (3,107 ft)
- Geummulsan (금물산; 今勿山) – 791 metres (2,595 ft)
- Geunsan (근산; 近山) – 504.8 metres (1,656 ft)
- Godaesan (고대산; 高大山) – 832 metres (2,730 ft)
- Gogosan (고고산; 高古山) – 853.6 metres (2,801 ft)
- Gojeoksan (고적산; 高積山) – 1,353.9 metres (4,442 ft)
- Gombong (곰봉; 熊峰) – 930.3 metres (3,052 ft)
- Gongjaksan (공작산; 孔雀山) – 887 metres (2,910 ft)
- Gorupogisan (고루포기산; None) – 1,238.3 metres (4,063 ft)
- Gubongdaesan (구봉대산; 九峰臺山) – 900.7 metres (2,955 ft)
- Guhaksan (구학산; 九鶴山) – 971 metres (3,186 ft)
- Gwaebangsan (괘방산; 掛榜山) – 339 metres (1,112 ft)
- Gwangdeoksan (광덕산; 廣德山) – 1,046 metres (3,432 ft)
- Gwittaegibong (귀때기청봉; None) – 1,577.6 metres (5,176 ft)
- Gyebangsan (계방산; 桂芳山) – 1,577 metres (5,174 ft)
- Gyegwansan (계관산; 鷄冠山) – 665.4 metres (2,183 ft)
- Gyejoksan (계족산; 鷄足山) – 889.6 metres (2,919 ft)
- Hambaeksan (함백산; 咸白山) – 1,573 metres (5,161 ft)
- Heungjeongsan (흥정산; 興亭山) – 1,276.5 metres (4,188 ft)
- Horyeongbong (호령봉; 虎嶺峰) – 1,561 metres (5,121 ft)
- Hwaaksan (화악산; 華岳山) – 1,468.3 metres (4,817 ft)
- Hwangbyeongsan (황병산; 黃柄山) – 1,407.1 metres (4,616 ft)
- Hwangcheolbong (황철봉; 黃鐵山) – 1,381 metres (4,531 ft)
- Hoemokbong (회목봉; 檜木峰) – 1,027 metres (3,369 ft)
- Hoeryeongbong (회령봉; 會靈峰) – 1,331 metres (4,367 ft)
- Jamdusan (잠두산; 蠶頭山) – 1,243 metres (4,078 ft)
- Janggunbawisan (장군바위산; None) – 1,140.4 metres (3,741 ft)
- Jangmisan (장미산; 長美山) – 978.8 metres (3,211 ft)
- Jangsan (장산; 壯山) – 1,408 metres (4,619 ft)
- Jatbong (잣봉; None) – 537 metres (1,762 ft)
- Jeombongsan (점봉산; 點鳳山) – 1,424.2 metres (4,673 ft)
- Jewangsan (제왕산; 帝王山) – 840.6 metres (2,758 ft)
- Jungwangsan (중왕산; 中旺山) – 1,376.1 metres (4,515 ft)
- Madaesan (마대산; 馬垈山) – 1,052.2 metres (3,452 ft)
- Maebongsan (매봉산; 梅峰山) – 1,267.6 metres (4,159 ft)
- Maebongsan (매봉산; 梅峰山) – 1,279.6 metres (4,198 ft)
- Maebongsan (매봉산; 梅峰山) – 1,095 metres (3,593 ft)
- Maebongsan (매봉산; 梅峰山) – 1,271.1 metres (4,170 ft)
- Maehwasan (매화산; 梅花山) – 1,085 metres (3,560 ft)
- Maenghyeonbong (맹현봉; 孟峴峰) – 1,214 metres (3,983 ft)
- Majeoksan (마적산; 馬蹟山) – 605.2 metres (1,986 ft)
- Mangyeongdaesan (망경대산; 望景臺山) – 1,087.9 metres (3,569 ft)
- Masan (마산; 馬山) – 1,051.9 metres (3,451 ft)
- Mindungsan (민둥산; None) – 1,118.8 metres (3,671 ft)
- Mireuksan (미륵산; 彌勒山) – 696 metres (2,283 ft)
- Mogusan (목우산; 牧牛山) – 1,066 metres (3,497 ft)
- Munsubong (문수봉; 文殊峰) – 1,517 metres (4,977 ft)
- Myeongbongsan (명봉산; 鳴鳳山) – 599 metres (1,965 ft)
- Myeonsan (면산; 綿山) – 1,245.2 metres (4,085 ft)
- Nambyeongsan (남병산; 南屛山) – 1,149.7 metres (3,772 ft)
- Namdaebong (남대봉; 南台峰) – 1,187 metres (3,894 ft)
- Neunggyeongbong (능경봉; 陵京峰) – 1,123.2 metres (3,685 ft)
- Nochusan (노추산; 魯鄒山) – 1,342 metres (4,403 ft)
- Noinbong (노인봉; 老人峰) – 1,338.1 metres (4,390 ft)
- Obongsan (오봉산; 五峰山) – 779 metres (2,556 ft)
- Obongsan (오봉산; 五峰山) – 1,136 metres (3,727 ft)
- Odaesan (오대산; 五臺山) – 1,563.4 metres (5,129 ft)
- Oeumsan (오음산; 五音山) – 930 metres (3,050 ft)
- Palbongsan (팔봉산; 八峯山) – 302 metres (991 ft)
- Sajasan (사자산; 獅子山) – 1,120 metres (3,670 ft)
- Samaksan (삼악산; 三岳山) – 654 metres (2,146 ft)
- Sambangsan (삼방산; 三芳山) – 980 metres (3,220 ft)
- Samyeongsan (사명산; 四明山) – 1,197.6 metres (3,929 ft)
- Sangjeongbawisan (상정바위산; None) – 1,006 metres (3,301 ft)
- Sangwonsan (상원산; 上元山) – 862 metres (2,828 ft)
- Seogiamsan (석이암산; 石耳岩山) – 970.4 metres (3,184 ft)
- Seokbyeongsan (석병산; 石屛山) – 1,055.3 metres (3,462 ft)
- Seonbawisan (선바위산; None) – 1,042 metres (3,419 ft)
- Seondalsan (선달산; 先達山) – 1,236 metres (4,055 ft)
- Seongjisan (성지산; 聖芝山) – 791 metres (2,595 ft)
- Seongnyongsan (석룡산; 石龍山) – 1,150 metres (3,770 ft)
- Seonjaryeong (선자령; 仙子嶺) – 1,157 metres (3,796 ft)
- Seoraksan (설악산; 雪岳山) – 1,707.9 metres (5,603 ft), third tallest mountain in South Korea, second tallest mountain in mainland South Korea.
- Seungdusan (승두산; 僧頭山) – 1,013 metres (3,323 ft)
- Sinseonbong (신선봉; 神仙峰) – 1,204 metres (3,950 ft)
- Sipjabong (십자봉; 十字峰) – 985 metres (3,232 ft)
- Sogyebangsan (소계방산; 小桂坊山) – 1,490.3 metres (4,889 ft)
- Soppulsan (소뿔산; None) – 1,118 metres (3,668 ft)
- Taebaeksan (태백산; 太白山) – 1,566.7 metres (5,140 ft)
- Taegisan (태기산; 泰岐山) – 1,258.8 metres (4,130 ft)
- Taehwasan (태화산; 太華山) – 1,027.4 metres (3,371 ft)
- Ungyosan (운교산; 雲橋山) – 925 metres (3,035 ft)
- Unmusan (운무산; 雲霧山) – 980.3 metres (3,216 ft)
- Wantaeksan (완택산; 完澤山) – 916.1 metres (3,006 ft)
- Yaksusan (약수산; 藥水山) – 1,306.2 metres (4,285 ft)
- Yeonyeopsan (연엽산; 蓮葉山) – 850 metres (2,790 ft)
- Yonghwasan (용화산; 龍華山) – 878.4 metres (2,882 ft)
- Yukbaeksan (육백산; 六百山) – 1,244.6 metres (4,083 ft)

=== North Chungcheong Province ===
- Akhwibong (악휘봉; 樂輝峰) – 940 metres (3,080 ft)
- Baegaksan (백악산; 百岳山) – 858 metres (2,815 ft)
- Baegunsan (백운산; 白雲山) – 1,085.7 metres (3,562 ft)
- Baekhwasan (백화산; 白華山) – 933 metres (3,061 ft)
- Baekhwasan (백화산; 白華山) – 1,064 metres (3,491 ft)
- Bakdalsan (박달산; 朴達山) – 825 metres (2,707 ft)
- Bakjwibong (박쥐봉; None) – 782 metres (2,566 ft)
- Boryeonsan (보련산; 寶蓮山) – 765 metres (2,510 ft)
- Bubong (부봉; 釜峰) – 917 metres (3,009 ft)
- Bukbawisan (북바위산; 北바위山) – 722 metres (2,369 ft)
- Cheondeungsan (천등산; 天燈山) – 807 metres (2,648 ft)
- Cheonghwasan (청화산; 靑華山) – 984 metres (3,228 ft)
- Cheontaesan (천태산; 天台山) – 714.7 metres (2,345 ft)
- Chilbosan (칠보산; 七寶山) – 778 metres (2,552 ft)
- Daemisan (대미산; 大美山) – 1,115 metres (3,658 ft)
- Daeseongsan (대성산; 大成山) – 705 metres (2,313 ft)
- Daeyasan (대야산; 大耶山) – 931 metres (3,054 ft)
- Deokgasan (덕가산; 德加山) – 858 metres (2,815 ft)
- Domyeongsan (도명산; 道明山) – 642 metres (2,106 ft)
- Dongsan (동산; 東山) – 896 metres (2,940 ft)
- Doraksan (도락산; 道樂山) – 964.4 metres (3,164 ft)
- Dosolbong (도솔봉; 兜率峰) – 1,314.2 metres (4,312 ft)
- Eoraesan (어래산; 御來山) – 1,063.6 metres (3,490 ft)
- Gaeunsan (가은산; 加隱山) – 575 metres (1,886 ft)
- Gaseopsan (가섭산; 迦葉山) – 710 metres (2,330 ft)
- Gakhosan (각호산; 角虎山) – 1,178.8 metres (3,867 ft)
- Galgisan (갈기산; 葛基山) – 595 metres (1,952 ft)
- Gamaksan (감악산; 紺岳山) – 886 metres (2,907 ft)
- Geumsusan (금수산; 錦繡山) – 1,015.8 metres (3,333 ft)
- Gubyeongsan (구병산; 九屛山) – 876 metres (2,874 ft)
- Gudambong (구담봉; 龜潭峯) – 330 metres (1,080 ft)
- Guhaksan (구학산; 九鶴山) – 971 metres (3,186 ft)
- Gungmangbong (국망봉; 國望峰) – 1,420 metres (4,660 ft)
- Gunjasan (군자산; 君子山) – 948 metres (3,110 ft)
- Guwangbong (구왕봉; 九王峰) – 1,244.6 metres (4,083 ft)
- Gyemyeongsan (계명산; 鷄明山) – 774 metres (2,539 ft)
- Haseolsan (하설산; 夏雪山) – 1,027.7 metres (3,372 ft)
- Heiyangsan (희양산; 曦陽山) – 998 metres (3,274 ft)
- Hwangaksan (황악산; 黃嶽山) – 1,111 metres (3,645 ft)
- Hwangjeongsan (황정산; 黃庭山) – 959 metres (3,146 ft)
- Hyeongjebong (형제봉; 兄弟峰) – 1,177.5 metres (3,863 ft)
- Imanbong (이만봉; 二萬峰) – 989 metres (3,245 ft)
- Indeungsan (인등산; 人登山) – 666 metres (2,185 ft)
- Jakseongsan (작성산; 鵲城山) – 845.5 metres (2,774 ft)
- Jangseongbong (장성봉; 長城峰) – 916.3 metres (3,006 ft)
- Jebibong (제비봉; 帝妃峰) – 710 metres (2,330 ft)
- Johangsan (조항산; 鳥項山) – 953.6 metres (3,129 ft)
- Joryeongsan (조령산; 鳥嶺山) – 1,025 metres (3,363 ft)
- Jukyeopsan (죽엽산; 竹葉山) – 859.2 metres (2,819 ft)
- Jungdaebong (중대봉; 中臺峰) – 830 metres (2,720 ft)
- Makjangbong (막장봉; 幕場峰) – 868 metres (2,848 ft)
- Mangdeokbong (망덕봉; 望德峰) – 928 metres (3,045 ft)
- Manisan (마니산; 摩尼山) – 640 metres (2,100 ft)
- Mansubong (만수봉; 萬壽峰) – 983.2 metres (3,226 ft)
- Minjujisan (민주지산; 岷周之山) – 1,242 metres (4,075 ft)
- Munsubong (문수봉; 文繡峰) – 1,161.5 metres (3,811 ft)
- Nagyeongsan (낙영산; 落影山) – 740 metres (2,430 ft)
- Namgunjasan (남군자산; 南君子山) – 836 metres (2,743 ft)
- Oksunbong (옥순봉; 玉荀峯) – 286 metres (938 ft)
- Poamsan (포암산; 布岩山) – 961.7 metres (3,155 ft)
- Poseongbong (포성봉; 捕城峰) – 933 metres (3,061 ft)
- Sambongsan (삼봉산; 三峰山) – 910 metres (2,990 ft)
- Samdobong (삼도봉; 三道峰) – 1,176 metres (3,858 ft)
- Seounsan (서운산; 瑞雲山) – 547.7 metres (1,797 ft)
- Sinseonbong (신선봉; 神仙峰) – 967 metres (3,173 ft)
- Sinseonbong (신선봉; 神仙峰) – 845 metres (2,772 ft)
- Sipjabong (십자봉; 十字峰) – 985 metres (3,232 ft)
- Sobaeksan (소백산; 小白山) – 1,440 metres (4,720 ft)
- Songnisan (속리산; 俗離山) – 1,058.4 metres (3,472 ft)
- Suribong (수리봉; 守理峰) – 761 metres (2,497 ft)
- Suribong (수리봉; 守理峰) – 1,019 metres (3,343 ft)
- Taehwasan (태화산; 太華山) – 1,027.4 metres (3,371 ft)
- Uamsan (우암산; 牛岩山) – 353.2 metres (1,159 ft)
- Woraksan (월악산; 月岳山) – 1,094 metres (3,589 ft)

=== South Chungcheong Province ===
- Amisan (아미산; 峨嵋山) – 630 metres (2,070 ft)
- Barangsan (바랑산; None) – 555 metres (1,821 ft)
- Baekhwasan (백화산; 白華山) – 233 metres (764 ft)
- Cheontaesan (천태산; 天台山) – 714.7 metres (2,345 ft)
- Chilbongsan (칠봉산; 七峰山) – 362 metres (1,188 ft)
- Chilgapsan (칠갑산; 七甲山) – 560.6 metres (1,839 ft)
- Daedunsan (대둔산; 大屯山) – 877.7 metres (2,880 ft)
- Deoksungsan (덕숭산; 德崇山) – 495 metres (1,624 ft)
- Gayasan (가야산; 伽倻山) – 677.6 metres (2,223 ft)
- Gobulsan (고불산; 古佛山) – 310 metres (1,020 ft)
- Gwangdeoksan (광덕산; 廣德山) – 699 metres (2,293 ft)
- Gyeryongsan (계룡산; 鷄龍山) – 845 metres (2,772 ft)
- Heukseongsan (흑성산; 黑城山) – 519 metres (1,703 ft)
- Illaksan (일락산; 日落山) – 521.4 metres (1,711 ft)
- Jinaksan (진악산; 進樂山) – 732.3 metres (2,403 ft)
- Mansusan (만수산; 萬壽山) – 574.4 metres (1,885 ft)
- Museongsan (무성산; 武城山) – 614 metres (2,014 ft)
- Obongsan (오봉산; 五峰山) – 262 metres (860 ft)
- Oseosan (오서산; 烏棲山) – 790.7 metres (2,594 ft)
- Palbongsan (팔봉산; 八峯山) – 362 metres (1,188 ft)
- Seodaesan (서대산; 西臺山) – 903.7 metres (2,965 ft)
- Taehwasan (태화산; 太華山) – 416 metres (1,365 ft)
- Wolseongbong (월성봉; 月城峰) – 903.7 metres (2,965 ft)
- Yongbongsan (용봉산; 龍鳳山) – 381 metres (1,250 ft)

=== North Jeolla Province ===
- Baegambong (백암봉; 百岩峰) – 1,503 metres (4,931 ft)
- Baegunsan (백운산; 白雲山) – 1,278.6 metres (4,195 ft)
- Bangjangsan (방장산; 方丈山) – 742.8 metres (2,437 ft)
- Bangmunsan (방문산; 方文山) – 606 metres (1,988 ft)
- Banyabong (반야봉; 般若峰) – 1,733.5 metres (5,687 ft)
- Baraebong (바래봉; None) – 1,165 metres (3,822 ft)
- Bonghwasan (봉화산; 烽火山) – 920 metres (3,020 ft)
- Bugwisan (부귀산; 富貴山) – 806.4 metres (2,646 ft)
- Byeonsan (변산; 邊山) – 509 metres (1,670 ft)
- Cheondeungsan (천등산; 天燈山) – 707 metres (2,320 ft)
- Chilbosan (칠보산; 七寶山) – 469 metres (1,539 ft)
- Chuwolsan (추월산; 秋月山) – 731.2 metres (2,399 ft)
- Daedeoksan (대덕산; 大德山) – 1,290 metres (4,230 ft)
- Deogyusan (덕유산; 德裕山) – 1,614 metres (5,295 ft)
- Deoktaesan (덕태산; 德泰山) – 1,113.2 metres (3,652 ft)
- Gangcheonsan (강천산; 剛泉山) – 583.7 metres (1,915 ft)
- Gubongsan (구봉산; 九峰山) – 919 metres (3,015 ft)
- Hambaeksan (함백산; 咸白山) – 1,572.9 metres (5,160 ft)
- Hoemunsan (회문산; 回文山) – 837 metres (2,746 ft)
- Jangansan (장안산; 長安山) – 1,236.9 metres (4,058 ft)
- Jeoksangsan (적상산; 赤裳山) – 1,034 metres (3,392 ft)
- Maisan (마이산; 馬耳山) – 686 metres (2,251 ft)
- Manbokdae (만복대; 萬福臺) – 1,433.4 metres (4,703 ft)
- Manhaengsan (만행산; 萬行山) – 909.6 metres (2,984 ft)
- Minjujisan (민주지산; 岷周之山) – 1,242 metres (4,075 ft)
- Mireuksan (미륵산; 彌勒山) – 430 metres (1,410 ft)
- Moaksan (모악산; 母岳山) – 793 metres (2,602 ft)
- Mundeokbong (문덕봉; 門德峰) – 598 metres (1,962 ft)
- Muryongsan (무룡산; 舞龍山) – 1,492 metres (4,895 ft)
- Naebyeonsan (내변산; 內邊山) – 459 metres (1,506 ft)
- Naejangsan (내장산; 內藏山) – 763 metres (2,503 ft)
- Namdeogyusan (남덕유산; 南德裕山) – 1,507.4 metres (4,946 ft)
- Obongsan (오봉산; 五峰山) – 513 metres (1,683 ft)
- Palgongsan (팔공산; 八公山) – 1,151 metres (3,776 ft) Not to be confused with mountain in Daegu of the same name.
- Samdobong (삼도봉; 三道峰) – 1,176 metres (3,858 ft)
- Seongaksan (선각산; 仙閣山) – 1,142 metres (3,747 ft)
- Seongsusan (성수산; 聖壽山) – 1,059.2 metres (3,475 ft)
- Seonunsan (선운산; 禪雲山) – 336 metres (1,102 ft)
- Unjangsan (운장산; 雲長山) – 1,125.9 metres (3,694 ft)
- Yeonseoksan (연석산; 硯石山) – 925 metres (3,035 ft)

=== South Jeolla Province ===
- Baegambong (백암봉; 百岩峰) – 1,503 metres (4,931 ft)
- Baegunsan (백운산; 白雲山) – 1,217.8 metres (3,995 ft)
- Baekamsan (백암산; 百岩山) – 741.2 metres (2,432 ft)
- Bangjangsan (방장산; 方丈山) – 742.8 metres (2,437 ft)
- Bangmunsan (방문산; 方文山) – 606 metres (1,988 ft)
- Banyabong (반야봉; 般若峰) – 1,733.5 metres (5,687 ft)
- Bulgapsan (불갑산; 佛甲山) – 515.9 metres (1,693 ft)
- Byeongpungsan (병풍산; 屛風山) – 822 metres (2,697 ft)
- Cheondeungsan (천등산; 天燈山) – 550 metres (1,800 ft)
- Cheongwansan (천관산; 天冠山) – 723.1 metres (2,372 ft)
- Chuwolsan (추월산; 秋月山) – 731.2 metres (2,399 ft)
- Dalmasan (달마산; 達摩山) – 489 metres (1,604 ft)
- Deokyusan (덕유산; 德裕山) – 1,614 metres (5,295 ft)
- Dongaksan (동악산; 動樂山) – 745 metres (2,444 ft)
- Dosolbong (도솔봉; 兜率峯) – 1,123.4 metres (3,686 ft)
- Duryunsan (두륜산; 頭輪山) – 700 metres (2,300 ft)
- Heukseoksan (흑석산; 黑石山) – 650 metres (2,130 ft)
- Gajisan (가지산; 迦智山) – 509.9 metres (1,673 ft)
- Gangcheonsan (강천산; 剛泉山) – 583.7 metres (1,915 ft)
- Geumjeonsan (금전산; 金錢山) – 667.9 metres (2,191 ft)
- Geumosan (금오산; 金鰲山) – 323 metres (1,060 ft)
- Gitdaebong (깃대봉; 旗大峰) – 367.8 metres (1,207 ft)
- Goribong (고리봉; 高利峰) – 1,248 metres (4,094 ft)
- Illimsan (일림산; 日林山) – 667.5 metres (2,190 ft)
- Imamsan (임암산; 笠岩山) – 654.8 metres (2,148 ft)
- Jeamsan (제암산; 帝岩山) – 807 metres (2,648 ft)
- Jeokjasan (적자산; 赤紫山) – 435 metres (1,427 ft)
- Jirisan (지리산; 智異山) – 1,915 metres (6,283 ft), the second-tallest mountain in South Korea and the tallest mountain in mainland South Korea.
- Jogyesan (조계산; 曹溪山) – 887.1 metres (2,910 ft)
- Jujaksan (주작산; 朱雀山) – 475 metres (1,558 ft)
- Manbokdae (만복대; 萬福臺) – 1,433.4 metres (4,703 ft)
- Mandeoksan (만덕산; 萬德山) – 409 metres (1,342 ft)
- Mohusan (모후산; 母後山) – 918.9 metres (3,015 ft)
- Mudeungsan (무등산; 無等山) – 1,187 metres (3,894 ft)
- Muryongsan (무룡산; 舞龍山) – 1,492 metres (4,895 ft)
- Nogodan (노고단; 老姑壇) – 1,507 metres (4,944 ft)
- Obongsan (오봉산; 五峰山) – 644 metres (2,113 ft)
- Obongsan (오봉산; 五峰山) – 392 metres (1,286 ft)
- Palyeongsan (팔영산; 八影山) – 608.6 metres (1,997 ft)
- Sajasan (사자산; 獅子山) – 666 metres (2,185 ft)
- Sambongsan (삼봉산; 三峰山) – 1,186.7 metres (3,893 ft)
- Samjeongsan (삼정산; 三丁山) – 1,225 metres (4,019 ft)
- Sanghwangbong (상황봉; 像皇峰) – 644 metres (2,113 ft)
- Sanseongsan (산성산; 山城山) – 603 metres (1,978 ft)
- Suinsan (수인산; 修仁山) – 561.2 metres (1,841 ft)
- Suwolsan (수월산; 水越山) – 128 metres (420 ft)
- Wangsirubong (왕시루봉; 往時鹿峰) – 1,243 metres (4,078 ft)
- Wolchulsan (월출산; 月出山) – 808.7 metres (2,653 ft)
- Yeongchwisan (영취산; 靈鷲山) – 510 metres (1,670 ft)

=== North Gyeongsang Province ===
- Baegaksan (백악산; 百岳山) – 858 metres (2,815 ft)
- Baegamsan (백암산; 百岩山) – 1,004 metres (3,294 ft)
- Baekhwasan (백화산; 白華山) – 1,064 metres (3,491 ft)
- Baekhwasan (백화산; 白華山) – 933 metres (3,061 ft)
- Biseulsan (비슬산; 琵瑟山) – 1,083.6 metres (3,555 ft)
- Bohyeonsan (보현산; 普賢山) – 1,121 metres (3,678 ft)
- Bonghwangsan (봉황산; 鳳凰山) – 819 metres (2,687 ft)
- Bubong (부봉; 釜峰) – 917 metres (3,009 ft)
- Cheondeungsan (천등산; 天燈山) – 574 metres (1,883 ft)
- Cheongnyangsan (청량산; 淸凉山) – 870.4 metres (2,856 ft)
- Cheongoksan (청옥산; 靑玉山) – 1,276.5 metres (4,188 ft)
- Cheonjusan (천주산; 天柱山) – 824 metres (2,703 ft)
- Chilbongsan (칠봉산; 七峰山) – 600 metres (2,000 ft)
- Chilbosan (칠보산; 七寶山) – 469 metres (1,539 ft)
- Chunghwasan (청화산; 靑華山) – 984.2 metres (3,229 ft)
- Daedeoksan (대덕산; 大德山) – 1,290 metres (4,230 ft)
- Daemisan (대미산; 大美山) – 1,115 metres (3,658 ft)
- Daeyasan (대야산; 大耶山) – 931 metres (3,054 ft)
- Danseoksan (단석산; 斷石山) – 827.2 metres (2,714 ft)
- Dojangsan (도장산; 道藏山) – 827.9 metres (2,716 ft)
- Dongyongsan (독용산; 禿用山) – 955.5 metres (3,135 ft)
- Dosolbong (도솔봉; 兜率峰) – 1,314.2 metres (4,312 ft)
- Dundeoksan (둔덕산; 屯德山) – 969.4 metres (3,180 ft)
- Eungbongsan (응봉산; 應峰山) – 999 metres (3,278 ft)
- Gajisan (가지산; 加智山) – 1,240 metres (4,070 ft)
- Gakhwasan (각화산; 覺華山) – 1,177 metres (3,862 ft)
- Gapjangsan (갑장산; 甲長山) – 805.7 metres (2,643 ft)
- Gasan (가산; 假山) – 901.6 metres (2,958 ft)
- Gayasan (가야산; 伽倻山) – 1,430 metres (4,690 ft)
- Geommasan (검마산; 劍馬山) – 1,017.2 metres (3,337 ft)
- Geumosan (금오산; 金烏山) – 976.6 metres (3,204 ft)
- Goheonsan (고헌산; 高獻山) – 1,032 metres (3,386 ft)
- Gonddeoksan (공덕산; 公德山) – 912.9 metres (2,995 ft)
- Guksabong (국사봉; 國師峰) – 728 metres (2,388 ft)
- Guryongsan (구룡산; 九龍山) – 1,345.7 metres (4,415 ft)
- Guwangbong (구왕봉; 九王峰) – 877 metres (2,877 ft)
- Gyeonggaksan (경각산; 鯨角山) – 659.3 metres (2,163 ft)
- Heiyangsan (희양산; 曦陽山) – 998 metres (3,274 ft)
- Hwangaksan (황악산; 黃嶽山) – 1,111 metres (3,645 ft)
- Hwanghaksan (황학산; 黃鶴山) – 912 metres (2,992 ft)
- Hwangjangsan (황장산; 黃腸山) – 1,077.4 metres (3,535 ft)
- Hyeongjebong (형제봉; 兄弟峰) – 1,177.5 metres (3,863 ft)
- Imanbong (이만봉; 二萬峰) – 989 metres (3,245 ft)
- Ilwolsan (일월산; 日月山) – 1,219 metres (3,999 ft)
- Jangseongbong (장성봉; 長城峰) – 916.3 metres (3,006 ft)
- Jeoksangsan (적상산; 赤裳山) – 1,024 metres (3,360 ft)
- Joryeongsan (조령산; 鳥嶺山) – 1,025 metres (3,363 ft)
- Juheulsan (주흘산; 主屹山) – 1,106 metres (3,629 ft)
- Juwangsan (주왕산; 周王山) – 720.6 metres (2,364 ft)
- Mireuksan (미륵산; 彌勒山) – 901 metres (2,956 ft)
- Munboksan (문복산; 文福山) – 1,015 metres (3,330 ft)
- Munsubong (문수봉; 文繡峰) – 1,161.5 metres (3,811 ft)
- Munsubong (문수봉; 文殊峰) – 1,517 metres (4,977 ft)
- Munsusan (문수산; 文殊山) – 1,205 metres (3,953 ft)
- Myeonsan (면산; 綿山) – 1,245.2 metres (4,085 ft)
- Naeyeonsan (내연산; 內延山) – 710 metres (2,330 ft)
- Namsan (남산; 南山) – 466 metres (1,529 ft)
- Namsan (남산; 南山) – 821 metres (2,694 ft)
- Noeumsan (노음산; 露陰山) – 728.5 metres (2,390 ft)
- Noejeongsan (뇌정산; 雷霆山) – 991.4 metres (3,253 ft)
- Obongsan (오봉산; 五峰山) – 235 metres (771 ft)
- Obongsan (오봉산; 五峰山) – 688 metres (2,257 ft)
- Palgaksan (팔각산; 八角山) – 632.7 metres (2,076 ft)
- Palgongsan (팔공산; 八公山) – 1,199 metres (3,934 ft)
- Poamsan (포암산; 布岩山) – 961.7 metres (3,155 ft)
- Poseongbong (포성봉; 捕城峰) – 933 metres (3,061 ft)
- Samdobong (삼도봉; 三道峰) – 1,176 metres (3,858 ft)
- Seondalsan (선달산; 先達山) – 1,236 metres (4,055 ft)
- Seonginbong (성인봉; 聖人峰) – 983.6 metres (3,227 ft)
- Sobaeksan (소백산; 小白山) – 1,440 metres (4,720 ft)
- Songnisan (속리산; 俗離山) – 1,058.4 metres (3,472 ft)
- Sudosan (수도산; 修道山) – 1,316.8 metres (4,320 ft)
- Taebaeksan (태백산; 太白山) – 1,566.7 metres (5,140 ft)
- Tohamsan (토함산; 吐含山) – 745 metres (2,444 ft)
- Tongosan (통고산; 通高山) – 1,066.5 metres (3,499 ft)
- Undalsan (운달산; 雲達山) – 1,097.2 metres (3,600 ft)
- Unmunsan (운문산; 雲門山) – 1,195 metres (3,921 ft)
- Wangdusan (왕두산; 王頭山) – 1,044.2 metres (3,426 ft)
- Yeonyeopsan (연엽산; 蓮葉山) – 775 metres (2,543 ft)

=== South Gyeongsang Province ===
- Baegunsan (백운산; 白雲山) – 1,278.6 metres (4,195 ft)
- Bigyesan (비계산; 飛鷄山) – 1,125.7 metres (3,693 ft)
- Bongdaesan (봉대산; 烽臺山) – 409 metres (1,342 ft)
- Bulmosan (불모산; 佛母山) – 399 metres (1,309 ft)
- Byeokbangsan (벽방산; 碧芳山) – 650 metres (2,130 ft)
- Byeolyusan (별유산; 別有山) – 1,046.2 metres (3,432 ft)
- Cheonhwangsan (천황산; 天皇山) – 1,189 metres (3,901 ft)
- Cheonseongsan (천성산; 千聖山) – 811.5 metres (2,662 ft)
- Cheontaesan (천태산; 天台山) – 631 metres (2,070 ft)
- Chilhyeonsan (칠현산; 七賢山) – 349 metres (1,145 ft)
- Daeseongsan (대성산; 大成山) – 593 metres (1,946 ft)
- Danjibong (단지봉; 丹芝峯) – 1,326.7 metres (4,353 ft)
- Eungbongsan (응봉산; 鷹峰山) – 473 metres (1,552 ft)
- Gajisan (가지산; 迦智山) – 1,240 metres (4,070 ft)
- Garasan (가라산; 加羅山) – 580 metres (1,900 ft)
- Gayasan (가야산; 伽倻山) – 1,430 metres (4,690 ft)
- Geomangsan (거망산; 擧網山) – 1,184 metres (3,885 ft)
- Geumjeongsan (금정산; 金井山) – 801.5 metres (2,630 ft)
- Geumsan (금산; 錦山) – 701 metres (2,300 ft)
- Geumosan (금오산; 金烏山) – 776 metres (2,546 ft)
- Geumwonsan (금원산; 金猿山) – 1,352.5 metres (4,437 ft)
- Gibaeksan (기백산; 箕白山) – 1,331 metres (4,367 ft)
- Gwaegwansan (괘관산; 掛冠山) – 1,251.6 metres (4,106 ft)
- Gwaebangsan (괘방산; 掛榜山) – 450 metres (1,480 ft)
- Gwannyongsan (관룡산; 觀龍山) – 739 metres (2,425 ft)
- Gyebangsan (계방산; 桂芳山) –
- Gyeryongsan (계룡산; 鷄龍山) – 566 metres (1,857 ft)
- Hogusan (호구산; 虎丘山) – 618 metres (2,028 ft)
- Hwamaesan (황매산; 黃梅山) – 1,108 metres (3,635 ft)
- Hwangmaesan (황매산; 黃梅山) – 1,108 metres (3,635 ft)
- Hwangseoksan (황석산; 黃石山) – 1,235 metres (4,052 ft)
- Hwawangsan (화왕산; 火旺山) – 756.6 metres (2,482 ft)
- Hyangnosan (향로산; 香爐山) – 979 metres (3,212 ft)
- Jaeyaksan (재약산; 載藥山) – 1,108 metres (3,635 ft)
- Jagulsan (자굴산; 自堀山) – 897 metres (2,943 ft)
- Jarimangsan (자리망산; 智異望山) – 398 metres (1,306 ft)
- Jirisan (지리산; 智異山) – 1,915 metres (6,283 ft)
- Jirisan (지리산; 智異山) – 397.6 metres (1,304 ft)
- Mangsan (망산; 望山) – 406 metres (1,332 ft)
- Minyeobong (미녀봉; 美女山) – 930 metres (3,050 ft)
- Mireuksan (미륵산; 彌勒山) – 461 metres (1,512 ft)
- Muhaksan (무학산; 舞鶴山) – 761.2 metres (2,497 ft)
- Namdeogyusan (남덕유산; 南德裕山) – 1,507.4 metres (4,946 ft)
- Nojasan (노자산; 老子山) – 565 metres (1,854 ft)
- Obongsan (오봉산; 五峰山) – 967 metres (3,173 ft)
- Obongsan (오봉산; 五峰山) – 525 metres (1,722 ft)
- Sambongsan (삼봉산; 三峰山) – 1,254 metres (4,114 ft)
- Sambongsan (삼봉산; 三峰山) – 1,186.7 metres (3,893 ft)
- Samjeongsan (삼정산; 三丁山) – 1,225 metres (4,019 ft)
- Samsinbong (삼신봉; 三神峰) – 1,284 metres (4,213 ft)
- Seobuksan (서북산; 西北山) – 738.5 metres (2,423 ft)
- Seolheulsan (설흘산; 雪屹山) – 488 metres (1,601 ft)
- Seongjesan (성제봉; 聖帝峰) – 1,115 metres (3,658 ft)
- Sinbulsan (신불산; 神佛山) – 1,209 metres (3,967 ft)
- Ungseokbong (웅석봉; 熊石峰) – 1,099 metres (3,606 ft)
- Unmunsan (운문산; 雲門山) – 1,195 metres (3,921 ft)
- Waryongsan (와룡산; 臥龍山) – 798.6 metres (2,620 ft)
- Wolbongsan (월봉산; 月峰山) – 1,279.2 metres (4,197 ft)
- Wonhyosan (원효산; 元曉山) – 922.2 metres (3,026 ft)
- Worasan (월아산; 月牙山) – 482 metres (1,581 ft)
- Wudusan (우두산; 牛頭山) – 1,046 metres (3,432 ft)
- Yanggaksan (양각산; 兩角山) – 1,130 metres (3,710 ft)
- Yeohangsan (여항산; 艅航山) – 770 metres (2,530 ft)
- Yeongchuksan (영축산; 靈鷲山) – 1,081 metres (3,547 ft)
- Yeongsinbong (영신봉; 靈神峰) – 1,652.9 metres (5,423 ft)
- Yeonhwasan (연화산; 蓮華山) – 528 metres (1,732 ft)

=== Jeju Province ===
- Hallasan (한라산; 漢拏山) – 1,947.06 metres (6,388.0 ft), the tallest mountain in South Korea.

== List of mountains in South Korea by height ==
Mountain	Height	Region	Image	Notes
Mount Halla	1,950 m (6,400 ft)	Jeju		The highest mountain in South Korea.
Mount Jiri	1,915 m (6,283 ft)	Gyeongnam (Jeonnam/Jeonbuk)		The highest mountain in South Korean mainland.
Banya Peak	1,732 m (5,682 ft)	Jeonnam/Jeonbuk (Gyeongnam)		Belongs to the Mount Jiri National Park. The highest mountain in Jeonnam and Jeonbuk.
Mount Seorak	1,708 m (5,604 ft)	Gangwon		The highest mountain in Gangwon.
Mount Deogyu	1,614 m (5,295 ft)	Jeonbuk (Gyeongnam)		
Mount Gyebang	1,577 m (5,174 ft)	Gangwon		
Mount Hambaek	1,573 m (5,161 ft)	Gangwon		Belongs to the Mount Taebaek National Park.
Mount Taebaek	1,567 m (5,141 ft)	Gangwon (Gyeongbuk)		
Mount Odae	1,563 m (5,128 ft)	Gangwon		
Mount Gariwang	1,561 m (5,121 ft)	Gangwon		
Gari Peak	1,519 m (4,984 ft)	Gangwon		Belongs to the Mount Seorak National Park.
Mount Namdeogyu	1,507 m (4,944 ft)	Gyeongnam (Jeonbuk)		Belongs to the Mount Deogyu National Park.
Duwi Peak	1,470 m (4,820 ft)	Gangwon		
Mount Hwaak	1,468 m (4,816 ft)	Gyeonggi (Gangwon)		The highest mountain in Gyeonggi.
Mount Barwang	1,459 m (4,787 ft)	Gangwon		
Mount Bangtae	1,444 m (4,738 ft)	Gangwon		
Mount Sobaek	1,440 m (4,720 ft)	Gyeongbuk/Chungbuk		The highest mountain in Chungbuk.
Mount Gaya	1,433 m (4,701 ft)	Gyeongnam/Gyeongbuk		
Manbokdae	1,433 m (4,701 ft)	Jeonnam/Jeonbuk		Belongs to the Mount Jiri National Park.
Mount Baegun	1,426 m (4,678 ft)	Gangwon		
Mount Jeombong	1,424 m (4,672 ft)	Gangwon		Belongs to the Mount Seorak National Park.
Mount Sangwon	1,421 m (4,662 ft)	Gangwon		
Jangsan	1,409 m (4,623 ft)	Gangwon		
Mount Hwangbyeong	1,407 m (4,616 ft)	Gangwon		Belongs to the Mount Odae National Park.
Mount Cheongok	1,404 m (4,606 ft)	Gangwon		
Mount Duta	1,391 m (4,564 ft)	Gangwon		Also called Mount Bakji.
Mount Baekseok	1,365 m (4,478 ft)	Gangwon		
Mount Eungbok	1,360 m (4,460 ft)	Gangwon		
Mount Geumwon	1,353 m (4,439 ft)	Gyeongnam		
Mount Baekdeok	1,349 m (4,426 ft)	Gangwon		
Mount Gaein	1,342 m (4,403 ft)	Gangwon		
Hoeryeong Peak	1,331 m (4,367 ft)	Gangwon		
Danji Peak	1,324 m (4,344 ft)	Gyeongnam/Gyeongbuk		
Mount Nochu	1,322 m (4,337 ft)	Gangwon		
Mount Sudo	1,317 m (4,321 ft)	Gyeongnam/Gyeongbuk		
Dosol Peak	1,314 m (4,311 ft)	Gyeongbuk/Chungbuk		Belongs to the Mount Sobaek National Park.

== See also ==
- List of mountains in Korea
