= Mount Sudo =

Mountain in South Korea

Coordinates: 35°05′N 126°08′E

Highest point
- Elevation: 1,317 m (4,321 ft)

Geography
- Location: North Gyeongsang Province, South Korea

Mount Sudo (수도산, Sudo-san) is a mountain of North Gyeongsang Province, eastern South Korea. It has an elevation of 1,317 metres.

== See also ==
- List of mountains of Korea
- List of mountains in South Korea
