= Geomangsan =

Mountain in South Korea

Highest point
- Elevation: 1,184 m (3,885 ft)

Geography
- Location: South Gyeongsang Province, South Korea

Korean name
- Hangul: 거망산
- Hanja: 擧網山
- RR: Geomangsan
- MR: Kŏmangsan

Geomangsan (Korean: 거망산) is a mountain of South Gyeongsang Province, southeastern South Korea. It has an elevation of 1,184 metres.

== See also ==
- List of mountains of Korea
