= Obongsan (North Jeolla) =

Mountain of Jeollabuk-do, South Korea

Highest point
- Elevation: 513 m (1,683 ft)

Geography
- Location: North Jeolla Province, South Korea

Obongsan is a mountain of North Jeolla Province, western South Korea. It has an elevation of 513 metres.

== See also ==
- List of mountains of Korea
