= Gapjangsan =

Mountain in South Korea

Highest point
- Elevation: 806 m (2,644 ft)
- Coordinates: 36°20′51″N 128°11′20″E

Geography
- Location: North Gyeongsang Province, South Korea

Korean name
- Hangul: 갑장산
- Hanja: 甲長山
- RR: Gapjangsan
- MR: Kapchangsan

Gapjangsan (Korean: 갑장산) is a mountain of North Gyeongsang Province, eastern South Korea. It has an elevation of 806 metres.

== See also ==
- List of mountains of Korea
