= Bubong (mountain) =

Mountain in South Korea

Highest point
- Elevation: 917 m (3,009 ft)

Geography
- Location: South Korea

Korean name
- Hangul: 부봉
- Hanja: 釜峰
- RR: Bubong
- MR: Pubong

Bubong (Korean: 부봉) is a mountain of South Korea. It has an elevation of 917 metres

== See also ==
- List of mountains of Korea
