= Mangyeongdaesan =

Mountain in South Korea

Highest point
- Elevation: 1,087 m (3,566 ft)

Geography
- Location: South Korea

Mangyeongdaesan is a mountain of South Korea. It has an elevation of 1,087 metres.

== See also ==
- List of mountains of Korea
