= Mohusan =

Mountain of Jeollanam-do, South Korea

Highest point
- Elevation: 919 m (3,015 ft)
- Coordinates: 35.035°N 127.183°E

Geography
- Location: South Jeolla Province, South Korea

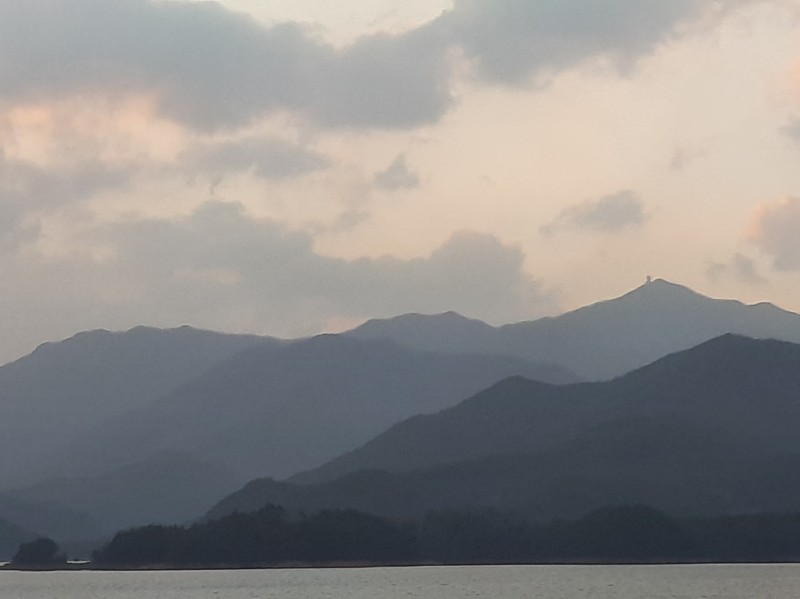
Mohusan mountain

Mohusan is a mountain of South Jeolla Province, southwestern South Korea. It has an elevation of 919 metres (3,015 ft).

== See also ==
- List of mountains in Korea
