= Sinseonbong (Goseong and Inje) =

Mountain in South Korea

Highest point
- Elevation: 1,204 m (3,950 ft)

Geography
- Location: South Korea

Sinseonbong is a mountain of South Korea. It has an elevation of 1,204 metres.

== See also ==
- List of mountains of Korea
