= Seokbyeongsan =

Mountain in South Korea

Highest point
- Elevation: 1,055.3 m (3,462 ft)

Geography
- Location: South Korea

Korean name
- Hangul: 석병산
- Hanja: 石屛山
- RR: Seokbyeongsan
- MR: Sŏkpyŏngsan

Seokbyeongsan (Korean: 석병산) is a mountain in Jeongseon County and Gangneung, Gangwon Province, South Korea. It has an elevation of 1,055.3 m (3,462 ft).

== See also ==
- List of mountains in Korea
