= Bangmunsan =

Mountain in South Korea

Highest point
- Elevation: 606 m (1,988 ft)
- Coordinates: 35.45°N 126.74°E

Geography
- Location: North Jeolla Province, South Korea

Korean name
- Hangul: 방문산
- Hanja: 方文山
- RR: Bangmunsan
- MR: Pangmunsan

Bangmunsan (Korean: 방문산) is a mountain of North Jeolla Province, western South Korea. It has an elevation of 606 metres.

== See also ==
- List of mountains of Korea
