= Dodeuramsan =

Mountain in Gyeonggi, South Korea

Highest point
- Elevation: 394 m (1,293 ft)
- Coordinates: 37°16′01″N 127°23′32″E

Geography
- Location: South Korea

Korean name
- Hangul: 도드람산
- Hanja: 도드람山
- RR: Dodeuramsan
- MR: Todŭramsan

Dodeuramsan (Korean: 도드람산) is a mountain in Gyeonggi Province, South Korea. It is within the boundaries of the city Icheon. Dodeuramsan has an elevation of 394 m (1,293 ft).

== See also ==
- List of mountains in Korea
