= Noeumsan =

Mountain in South Korea

Highest point
- Elevation: 729 m (2,392 ft)

Geography
- Location: North Gyeongsang Province, South Korea

Noeumsan is a mountain of North Gyeongsang Province, eastern South Korea. It has an elevation of 729 metres.

== See also ==
- List of mountains of Korea
