= Horyeongbong =

Mountain in Gangwon Province, South Korea

Highest point
- Elevation: 1,561 m (5,121 ft)

Geography
- Location: South Korea

Korean name
- Hangul: 호령봉
- Hanja: 虎嶺峰
- RR: Horyeongbong
- MR: Horyŏngbong

Horyeongbong (Korean: 호령봉) is a mountain between the counties of Pyeongchang and Hongcheon, Gangwon Province, South Korea. It has an elevation of 1,561 m (5,121 ft).

== See also ==
- List of mountains in Korea
