= Jongjasan (Gyeonggi) =

Mountain in Pocheon, South Korea

Highest point
- Elevation: 877.2 m (2,878 ft)
- Coordinates: 38°05′N 127°11′E

Geography
- Location: South Korea

Korean name
- Hangul: 종자산
- Hanja: 種子山
- RR: Jongjasan
- MR: Chongjasan

Jongjasan (Korean: 종자산) is a mountain near Pocheon, Gyeonggi Province in South Korea. It has an elevation of 877.2 m (2,878 ft).

== See also ==
- List of mountains in Korea
