= Nochusan =

Mountain in Gangneung, Gangwon, South Korea

Highest point
- Elevation: 1,342 m (4,403 ft)

Geography
- Location: South Korea

Korean name
- Hangul: 노추산
- Hanja: 魯鄒山
- RR: Nochusan
- MR: Noch'usan

Nochusan (Korean: 노추산) is a mountain in Gangneung and Jeongseon County, Gangwon Province, South Korea. It has an elevation of 1,342 m (4,403 ft).

== See also ==
- List of mountains in Korea
