= Mansubong =

Mountain in South Korea

Highest point
- Elevation: 983 m (3,225 ft)

Geography
- Location: South Korea

Mansubong is a mountain of South Korea. It has an elevation of 983 metres.

== See also ==
- List of mountains of Korea
