= Wolbongsan =

Mountain in South Korea

Highest point
- Elevation: 1,279 m (4,196 ft)
- Coordinates: 35°36′52″N 128°23′46″E

Geography
- Location: South Gyeongsang Province, South Korea

Wolbongsan is a mountain of South Gyeongsang Province, southeastern South Korea. It has an elevation of 1,279 metres.

== See also ==
- List of mountains of Korea
