= Bakjisan =

Mountain in South Korea

Highest point
- Elevation: 1,394 m (4,573 ft)

Geography
- Location: South Korea

Korean name
- Hangul: 박지산
- Hanja: 博芝山
- RR: Bakjisan
- MR: Pakchisan

Bakjisan (Korean: 박지산) is a mountain in Pyeongchang County, Gangwon Province, South Korea. It has an elevation of 1,394 m (4,573 ft).

== See also ==
- List of mountains in Korea
