= Imanbong =

Mountain in South Korea

Highest point
- Elevation: 989 m (3,245 ft)

Geography
- Location: South Korea

Imanbong is a mountain of South Korea. It has an elevation of 989 metres.

== See also ==
- List of mountains of Korea
