= Gakhosan =

Mountain in South Korea

Coordinates: 36°04′N 127°51′E

Highest point
- Elevation: 1,179 m (3,868 ft)

Geography
- Location: North Chungcheong Province, South Korea

Gakhosan (Korean: 각호산) is a mountain of North Chungcheong Province, South Korea. It has an elevation of 1,179 metres (3,868 ft).

== See also ==
- List of mountains of Korea
