= Bugwisan =

Mountain in South Korea

Coordinates: 35°49′N 127°24′E

Highest point
- Elevation: 806 m (2,644 ft)

Geography
- Location: North Jeolla Province, South Korea

Korean name
- Hangul: 부귀산
- Hanja: 富貴山
- RR: Bugwisan
- MR: Pugwisan

Bugwisan (Korean: 부귀산) is a mountain in North Jeolla Province, western South Korea. It has an elevation of 806 m (2,644 ft).

== See also ==
- List of mountains of Korea
