= Gamabong =

Mountain in Gangwon, South Korea

Coordinates: 37°53′10″N 128°10′36″E

Highest point
- Elevation: 1,191 m (3,907 ft)

Geography
- Location: South Korea

Korean name
- Hangul: 가마봉
- Hanja: 可馬峰
- RR: Gamabong
- MR: Kamabong

Gamabong (Korean: 가마봉) is a mountain of South Korea. It has an elevation of 1,191 metres.

== See also ==
- List of mountains of Korea
