= Byeokbangsan =

Mountain in South Korea

Highest point
- Elevation: 650 m (2,130 ft)

Geography
- Location: South Gyeongsang Province, South Korea

Korean name
- Hangul: 벽방산
- Hanja: 碧芳山
- RR: Byeokbangsan
- MR: Pyŏkpangsan

Byeokbangsan (Korean: 벽방산) is a mountain of South Gyeongsang Province, southeastern South Korea. It has an elevation of 650 metres.

== See also ==
- List of mountains of Korea
