= Gakhwasan =

Mountain in South Korea

Coordinates: 37°00′N 128°54′E

Highest point
- Elevation: 1,117 m (3,665 ft)

Geography
- Location: North Gyeongsang Province, South Korea

Korean name
- Hangul: 각화산
- Hanja: 覺華山
- RR: Gakhwasan
- MR: Kakhwasan

Gakhwasan (Korean: 각화산) is a mountain of North Gyeongsang Province, eastern South Korea. It has an elevation of 1,177 metres.

== See also ==
- List of mountains of Korea
