= Heungjeongsan =

Mountain in South Korea

Highest point
- Elevation: 1,276.5 m (4,188 ft)

Geography
- Location: South Korea

Korean name
- Hangul: 흥정산
- Hanja: 興亭山
- RR: Heungjeongsan
- MR: Hŭngjŏngsan

Heungjeongsan (Korean: 흥정산) is a mountain in Pyeongchang County, Gangwon Province, South Korea. It has an elevation of 1,276.5 m (4,188 ft).

== See also ==
- List of mountains in Korea
