= Daegeumsan (Gyeonggi) =

Mountain in Gyeonggi Province, South Korea

Highest point
- Elevation: 704 m (2,310 ft)
- Coordinates: 37°49′N 127°25′E

Geography
- Location: South Korea

Korean name
- Hangul: 대금산
- Hanja: 大金山
- RR: Daegeumsan
- MR: Taegŭmsan

Daegeumsan (Korean: 대금산) is a mountain in Gyeonggi Province, South Korea. It sits in Gapyeong County. Daegeumsan has an elevation of 704 m (2,310 ft).

== See also ==
- List of mountains in Korea
