= Geomunsan =

Mountain in Pyeongchang, South Korea

Highest point
- Elevation: 1,175 m (3,855 ft)
- Coordinates: 35°18′N 129°09′E

Geography
- Location: South Korea

Korean name
- Hangul: 거문산
- Hanja: 巨文山
- RR: Geomunsan
- MR: Kŏmunsan

Geomunsan (Korean: 거문산) is a mountain in Pyeongchang County, Gangwon Province, South Korea. It has an elevation of 1,175 m (3,855 ft).

== See also ==
- List of mountains in Korea
