= Hwangjeongsan =

Mountain in South Korea

Highest point
- Elevation: 959 m (3,146 ft)

Geography
- Location: South Korea

Hwangjeongsan is a mountain of South Korea. It has an elevation of 959 metres.

== See also ==
- List of mountains of Korea
