= Danwolsan =

Mountain in South Korea

Danwolbong

Highest point
- Elevation: 778 m (2,552 ft)

Geography
- Location: South Korea

Korean name
- Hangul: 단월산
- Hanja: 丹月山
- RR: Danwolsan
- MR: Tanwŏlsan

Danwolsan (Korean: 단월산) is a mountain of South Korea. It has an elevation of 778 metres

== See also ==
- List of mountains of Korea
