= Illaksan =

Mountain in South Korea

Coordinates: 36°27′N 127°06′E

Highest point
- Elevation: 521 m (1,709 ft)

Geography
- Location: South Chungcheong Province, South Korea

Illaksan is a mountain of South Chungcheong Province, western South Korea. It has an elevation of 521 metres.

== See also ==
- List of mountains of Korea
