= Nojasan =

Mountain in South Korea

Highest point
- Elevation: 565 m (1,854 ft)

Geography
- Location: South Gyeongsang Province, South Korea

Nojasan is a mountain of South Gyeongsang Province, southeastern South Korea. It has an elevation of 565 metres.

== See also ==
- List of mountains of Korea
