= Cheonjibong (Gangwon) =

Mountain in South Korea

Cheonjibong (Gangwon-do)

Geography
- Location: South Korea

Korean name
- Hangul: 천지봉
- Hanja: 天地峰
- RR: Cheonjibong
- MR: Ch'ŏnjibong

Cheonjibong (Korean: 천지봉) is a mountain of South Korea. It has an altitude of 1087 metres.

== See also ==
- List of mountains of Korea
