= Eodapsan =

Mountain in Hoengseong, South Korea

Highest point
- Elevation: 789 m (2,589 ft)

Geography
- Location: South Korea

Korean name
- Hangul: 어답산
- Hanja: 御踏山
- RR: Eodapsan
- MR: Ŏdapsan

Eodapsan (Korean: 어답산) is a mountain in Hoengseong County, Gangwon Province, South Korea. It has an elevation of 789 m (2,589 ft).

== See also ==
- List of mountains in Korea
