= Sogyebangsan =

Mountain in South Korea

Highest point
- Elevation: 1,490 m (4,890 ft)

Geography
- Location: South Korea

Sogyebangsan is a mountain of South Korea. It has an elevation of 1,490 metres.

== See also ==
- List of mountains of Korea
