= Boraebong =

Mountain in Pyeongchang, South Korea

Highest point
- Elevation: 1,324.3 m (4,345 ft)

Geography
- Location: South Korea

Korean name
- Hangul: 보래봉
- Hanja: 寶來峰
- RR: Boraebong
- MR: Poraebong

Boraebong (Korean: 보래봉) is a mountain in Pyeongchang County, Gangwon Province, South Korea. It has an elevation of 1,324.3 m (4,345 ft).

== See also ==
- List of mountains in Korea
