= Dosolbong (Jeonnam-Gwangju) =

Mountain in South Korea

Highest point
- Elevation: 1,123 m (3,684 ft)

Geography
- Location: South Jeolla Province, South Korea

Dosolbong (Korean: 도솔봉) is a mountain of South Jeolla Province, western South Korea. It has an elevation of 1,123 metres.

== See also ==
- List of mountains of Korea
