= Danjibong =

Mountain in South Korea

Highest point
- Elevation: 1,327 m (4,354 ft)

Geography
- Location: South Gyeongsang Province, South Korea

Korean name
- Hangul: 단지봉
- Hanja: 丹芝峯
- RR: Danjibong
- MR: Tanjibong

Danjibong (Korean: 단지봉) is a mountain of South Gyeongsang Province, southeastern South Korea. It has an elevation of 1,327 metres (4,354 feet).

== See also ==
- List of mountains of Korea
