= Deoksusan =

Mountain in Pyeongchang, South Korea

Highest point
- Elevation: 1,000.2 m (3,281 ft)

Geography
- Location: South Korea

Korean name
- Hangul: 덕수산
- Hanja: 德修山
- RR: Deoksusan
- MR: Tŏksusan

Deoksusan (Korean: 덕수산) is a mountain in Pyeongchang County, Gangwon Province, South Korea. It has an elevation of 1,000.2 m (3,281 ft).

== See also ==
- List of mountains in Korea
