= Gangcheonsan =

Mountain in South Korea

Coordinates: 35°24′15″N 127°02′56″E

Highest point
- Elevation: 584 m (1,916 ft)

Geography
- Location: North Jeolla Province, South Korea

Gangcheonsan (Korean: 강천산) is a mountain of North Jeolla Province, western South Korea. It has an elevation of 584 metres.

== See also ==
- List of mountains of Korea
