= Yongbongsan =

Mountain in South Korea

Highest point
- Elevation: 381 m (1,250 ft)

Geography
- Location: South Chungcheong Province, South Korea

Yongbongsan is a mountain of South Chungcheong Province, western South Korea. It has an elevation of 381 metres.

== See also ==
- List of mountains of Korea
