= Soppulsan =

Mountain in South Korea

Coordinates: 37°54′N 128°08′E

Highest point
- Elevation: 1,113 m (3,652 ft)

Geography
- Location: South Korea

Soppulsan is a mountain of South Korea. It has an elevation of 1,118 metres.

== See also ==
- List of mountains of Korea
