= Geommasan =

Mountain in South Korea

Highest point
- Elevation: 1,017 m (3,337 ft)

Geography
- Location: North Gyeongsang Province, South Korea

Korean name
- Hangul: 검마산
- Hanja: 劍馬山
- RR: Geommasan
- MR: Kŏmmasan

Geommasan (Korean: 검마산) is a mountain of North Gyeongsang Province, eastern South Korea. It has an elevation of 1,017 metres (3,337 ft).

== See also ==
- List of mountains of Korea
