= Bokjusan =

Mountain in Cheorwon, South Korea

Highest point
- Elevation: 1,152 m (3,780 ft)
- Coordinates: 38°08′N 127°30′E

Geography
- Location: South Korea

Korean name
- Hangul: 복주산
- Hanja: 伏主山
- RR: Bokjusan
- MR: Pokchusan

Bokjusan (Korean: 복주산) is a mountain in Cheorwon County, Gangwon Province, South Korea. It has an elevation of 1,152 m (3,780 ft). It is part of the Bokjusan Mountain National Recreation Forest, which was officially designated as a national recreational forest in 1998.

== See also ==
- List of mountains in Korea
