= Yeonyeopsan (Gangwon) =

Mountain in South Korea

Seungdusan

Highest point
- Elevation: 850 m (2,790 ft)

Geography
- Location: South Korea

Korean name
- Hangul: 연엽산
- Hanja: 蓮葉山
- RR: Yeonyeopsan
- MR: Yŏnyŏpsan

Yeonyeopsan (Korean: 연엽산) is a mountain in Chuncheon and Hongcheon County, Gangwon Province, South Korea. It has an elevation of 850 m (2,789 ft).

== See also ==
- List of mountains in Korea
