= Juheulsan =

Mountain in South Korea

Coordinates: 36°47′19″N 128°06′02″E

Highest point
- Elevation: 1,106 m (3,629 ft)

Geography
- Location: North Gyeongsang Province, South Korea

Juheulsan is a mountain of North Gyeongsang Province, eastern South Korea. It has an elevation of 1,106 metres.

== See also ==
- List of mountains of Korea
