= Galgisan (North Chungcheong) =

Mountain of Chungcheongbuk-do, South Korea

Highest point
- Elevation: 595 m (1,952 ft)

Geography
- Location: North Chungcheong Province, South Korea

Galgisan (Korean: 갈기산) is a mountain of North Chungcheong Province, South Korea. It has an elevation of 595 metres.

== See also ==
- List of mountains of Korea
