= Durobong =

Mountain in Gangwon Province, South Korea

Highest point
- Elevation: 1,421.9 m (4,665 ft)

Geography
- Location: South Korea

Korean name
- Hangul: 두로봉
- Hanja: 頭老峰
- RR: Durobong
- MR: Turobong

Durobong (Korean: 두로봉) is a mountain in Gangwon Province, South Korea. Its area extends across Pyeongchang County, Hongcheon County and Gangneung. It has an elevation of 1,421.9 m (4,665 ft).

== See also ==
- List of mountains in Korea
