= Namgunjasan =

Mountain in South Korea

Coordinates: 36°43′N 127°53′E

Highest point
- Elevation: 836 m (2,743 ft)

Geography
- Location: South Korea

Namgunjasan is a mountain of South Korea. It has an elevation of 836 metres.

== See also ==
- List of mountains of Korea
