= Yeonyeopsan (North Gyeongsang) =

Mountain in South Korea

Yeonyeopsan (Gyeongsangbuk-do)

Highest point
- Elevation: 775 m (2,543 ft)

Geography
- Location: North Gyeongsang Province, South Korea

Yeonyeopsan is a mountain of North Gyeongsang Province, eastern South Korea. It has an elevation of 775 metres.

== See also ==
- List of mountains of Korea
