= Jungdaebong =

Mountain in South Korea

Highest point
- Elevation: 830 m (2,720 ft)

Geography
- Location: South Korea

Jungdaebong is a mountain of South Korea. It has an elevation of 830 metres.

== See also ==
- List of mountains of Korea
