= Baekdunbong =

Mountain in Gyeonggi Province, South Korea

Highest point
- Elevation: 974 m (3,196 ft)
- Coordinates: 37°55′26″N 127°27′04″E

Geography
- Location: South Korea

Korean name
- Hangul: 백둔봉
- Hanja: 柏屯峰
- RR: Baekdunbong
- MR: Paektunbong

Baekdunbong (Korean: 백둔봉) is a mountain in Gyeonggi Province, South Korea. It sits within Gapyeong County. Baekdunbong has an elevation of 974 m (3,196 ft).

== See also ==
- List of mountains in Korea
