= Mindungsan (Gyeonggi) =

Mountain in South Korea

Mindungsan (Gyeonggi-do)

Highest point
- Elevation: 1,023 m (3,356 ft)

Geography
- Location: South Korea

Korean name
- Hangul: 민둥산
- Hanja: 민둥山
- RR: Mindungsan
- MR: Mindungsan

Mindungsan (Korean: 민둥산) is a mountain of South Korea. It has an elevation of 1,023 metres.

== See also ==
- List of mountains of Korea
