= Byeolyusan =

Mountain in South Korea

Highest point
- Elevation: 1,046 m (3,432 ft)

Geography
- Location: South Gyeongsang Province, South Korea

Korean name
- Hangul: 별유산
- Hanja: 別有山
- RR: Byeoryusan
- MR: Pyŏryusan

Byeolyusan (Korean: 별유산) is a mountain of South Gyeongsang Province, southeastern South Korea. It has an elevation of 1,046 metres.

== See also ==
- List of mountains of Korea
