= Nogodan =

Mountain in South Korea

Coordinates: 35°18′N 127°32′E

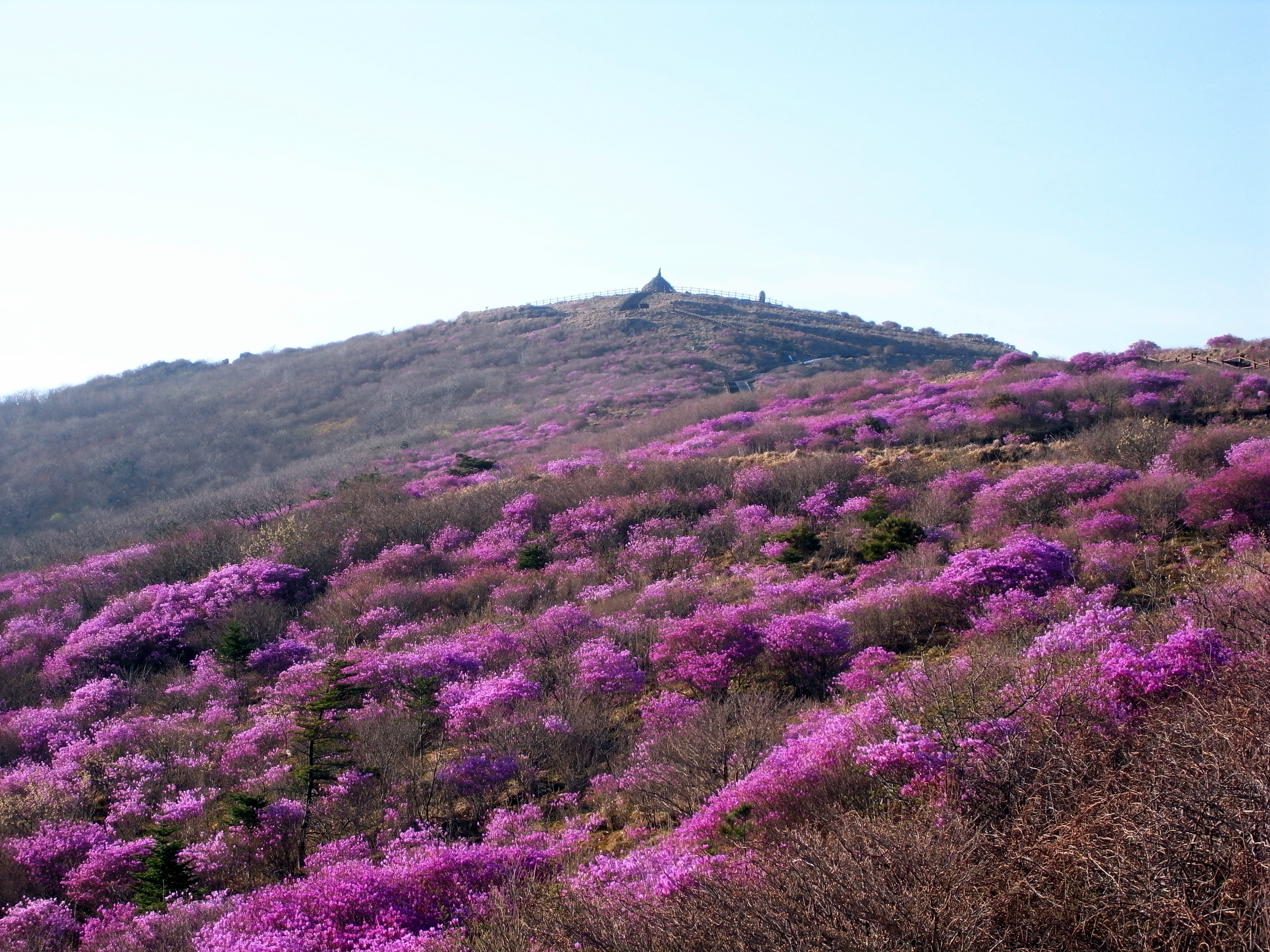
- Nogodan at Jirisan, Korea

Highest point
- Elevation: 1,507 m (4,944 ft)

Geography
- Location: South Jeolla Province, South Korea

Nogodan is a mountain of South Jeolla Province, southwestern South Korea. It has an elevation of 1,507 metres.

== See also ==
- List of mountains of Korea
