= Baekdeoksan =

Mountain in Gangwon Province, South Korea

Highest point
- Elevation: 1,350 m (4,430 ft)
- Listing: Mountains of Korea
- Coordinates: 37°23′48″N 128°17′36″E

Geography
- Country: South Korea
- Province: Gangwon
- Counties: Yeongwol and Pyeongchang

Korean name
- Hangul: 백덕산
- Hanja: 白德山
- RR: Baekdeoksan
- MR: Paektŏksan

Baekdeoksan (Korean: 백덕산) is a mountain that sits between the counties of Yeongwol and Pyeongchang, Gangwon Province, South Korea. It has an elevation of 1,350 m (4,429 ft).
