= Dogyongsan =

Mountain in South Korea

Highest point
- Elevation: 955.5 m (3,135 ft)
- Coordinates: 37.700°N 127.016°E

Geography
- Location: North Gyeongsang Province, South Korea

Korean name
- Hangul: 독용산
- Hanja: 禿用山
- RR: Dogyongsan
- MR: Togyongsan

Dogyongsan (Korean: 독용산) is a mountain of North Gyeongsang Province, eastern South Korea. It has an elevation of 955.5 m (3,135 ft).

== See also ==
- List of mountains in Korea
