= Gyebangsan (South Gyeongsang) =

Mountain of South Gyeongsang Province

Geography
- Location: South Gyeongsang Province, South Korea

Korean name
- Hangul: 계방산
- Hanja: 桂芳山
- RR: Gyebangsan
- MR: Kyebangsan

Gyebangsan (Korean: 계방산) is a mountain of South Gyeongsang Province, located in southeastern South Korea.

== See also ==
- List of mountains of Korea
