= Seongjesan =

Mountain in South Korea

Coordinates: 38°18′N 127°26′E

Highest point
- Elevation: 1,115 m (3,658 ft)

Geography
- Location: South Gyeongsang Province, South Korea

Seongjesan is a mountain of South Gyeongsang Province, southeastern South Korea. It has an elevation of 1,115 metres.

== See also ==
- List of mountains of Korea
