= Muryongsan =

Mountain of North Jeolla Province, western South Korea

- Location within South Korea

Highest point
- Elevation: 1,492 m (4,895 ft)
- Coordinates: 35°48′00″N 127°43′12″E

Geography
- Location: North Jeolla Province, South Korea

Korean name
- Hangul: 무룡산
- Hanja: 舞龍山
- RR: Muryongsan
- MR: Muryongsan

Muryongsan (Korean: 무룡산) is a mountain of North Jeolla Province, western South Korea. It has an elevation of 1,492 metres (4,895 ft).

== See also ==
- List of mountains of Korea
