= Baekseoksan =

Mountain in Gangwon Province, South Korea

Coordinates: 38°16′N 127°56′E

Highest point
- Elevation: 1,364.6 m (4,477 ft)

Geography
- Location: South Korea

Korean name
- Hangul: 백석산
- Hanja: 白石山
- RR: Baekseoksan
- MR: Paeksŏksan

Baekseoksan (Korean: 백석산) is a mountain in Pyeongchang County, Gangwon Province, South Korea. It has an elevation of 1,364.6 m (4,477 ft).

== See also ==
- List of mountains in Korea
