= Maenghyeonbong =

Mountain in South Korea

Highest point
- Elevation: 1,214 m (3,983 ft)
- Coordinates: 37.830°N 128.319°E

Geography
- Location: South Korea

Maenghyeonbong is a mountain of South Korea. It has an elevation of 1,214 metres (3,983 ft)

== See also ==
- List of mountains in Korea
