= Manbokdae =

Mountain in South Korea

Highest point
- Elevation: 1,433 m (4,701 ft)
- Coordinates: 35°20′52″N 127°30′58″E

Geography
- Location: North Jeolla Province, South Korea

Korean name
- Hangul: 만복대
- Hanja: 萬福臺
- RR: Manbokdae
- MR: Manboktae

Manbokdae (Korean: 만복대) is a mountain of North Jeolla Province, in western South Korea. It has an elevation of 1,433 metres.

== See also ==
- List of mountains of Korea
