= Suribong (Jecheon and Chungju) =

Mountain in South Korea

Highest point
- Elevation: 761 m (2,497 ft)

Geography
- Location: South Korea

Suribong is a mountain of South Korea. It has an elevation of 761 metres.

== See also ==
- List of mountains of Korea
