= Gobulsan =

Mountain in South Korea

Highest point
- Elevation: 310 m (1,020 ft)

Geography
- Location: South Chungcheong Province, South Korea

Korean name
- Hangul: 고불산
- Hanja: 古佛山
- RR: Gobulsan
- MR: Kobulsan

Gobulsan (Korean: 고불산) is a mountain of South Chungcheong Province, western South Korea. It has an elevation of 310 meters.

== See also ==
- List of mountains of Korea
