= Sudeoksan =

Mountain in South Korea

Coordinates: 37°55′N 127°31′E

Highest point
- Elevation: 794 m (2,605 ft)

Geography
- Location: South Korea

Sudeoksan is a mountain of South Korea. It has an elevation of 794 metres

== See also ==
- List of mountains of Korea
