= Gorupogisan =

Mountain in Gangwon Province, South Korea

Highest point
- Elevation: 1,238.3 m (4,063 ft)
- Coordinates: 37°39′N 128°44′E

Geography
- Location: South Korea

Korean name
- Hangul: 고루포기산
- Hanja: 고루포기山
- RR: Gorupogisan
- MR: Korup'ogisan

Gorupogisan (Korean: 고루포기산) is a mountain between Pyeongchang County and Gangneung, Gangwon Province, South Korea. It has an elevation of 1,238.3 m (4,063 ft).

== See also ==
- List of mountains in Korea
