= Sanghaebong =

Mountain in South Korea

Highest point
- Elevation: 1,010 m (3,310 ft)

Geography
- Location: South Korea

Sanghaebong is a mountain of South Korea. It has an elevation of 1,010 metres (3,310 ft).

== See also ==
- List of mountains of Korea
