= Mangdeokbong =

Mountain in South Korea

Coordinates: 36°20′N 127°03′E

Highest point
- Elevation: 928 m (3,045 ft)

Geography
- Location: South Korea

Mangdeokbong is a mountain of South Korea. It has an elevation of 928 metres.

== See also ==
- List of mountains of Korea
