= Dongsan =

Mountain in South Korea

Highest point
- Elevation: 896 m (2,940 ft)

Geography
- Location: North Chungcheong Province, South Korea

Dongsan (Korean: 동산) is a mountain of North Chungcheong Province, South Korea. It has an altitude of 896 metres.

== See also ==
- List of mountains of Korea
