= Oseosan =

Mountain in South Korea

Coordinates: 36°27′N 126°40′E

Highest point
- Elevation: 791 m (2,595 ft)

Geography
- Location: South Chungcheong Province, South Korea

Oseosan is a mountain of South Chungcheong Province, western South Korea. It has an elevation of 791 metres.

== See also ==
- List of mountains of Korea
