= Sanseongsan =

Mountain in South Korea

Highest point
- Elevation: 603 m (1,978 ft)
- Coordinates: 35°23′18″N 127°02′04″E

Geography
- Location: Damyang County, South Jeolla Province, South Korea

Sanseongsan is a mountain of South Jeolla Province, southwestern South Korea. It has an elevation of 603 metres.

== See also ==
- List of mountains of Korea
