= Gokdalsan =

Mountain in Gapyeong, South Korea

Highest point
- Elevation: 628 m (2,060 ft)
- Coordinates: 37°39′N 127°28′E

Geography
- Location: South Korea

Korean name
- Hangul: 곡달산
- Hanja: 鵠達山
- RR: Gokdalsan
- MR: Koktalsan

Gokdalsan (Korean: 곡달산) is a mountain in Gapyeong County, Gyeonggi Province, South Korea. Gokdalsan has an elevation of 628 m (2,060 ft).

== See also ==
- List of mountains in Korea
