= Banyabong =

Mountain in South Korea

Highest point
- Coordinates: 35.3189°N 127.5677°E

Geography
- Location: North Jeolla Province, South Korea

Korean name
- Hangul: 반야봉
- Hanja: 般若峰
- RR: Banyabong
- MR: Panyabong

Banyabong is a mountain of North Jeolla Province, western South Korea. It has an altitude of 1732 metres.

== See also ==
- List of mountains of Korea
