= Imamsan =

Mountain in South Korea

Highest point
- Elevation: 655 m (2,149 ft)

Geography
- Location: South Jeolla Province, South Korea

Imamsan is a mountain of South Jeolla Province, southwestern South Korea. It has an elevation of 655 metres.

== See also ==
- List of mountains of Korea
