= Obongsan (Gyeongju) =

Mountain in South Korea

Highest point
- Elevation: 688 m (2,257 ft)

Geography
- Location: North Gyeongsang Province, South Korea

Obongsan is a mountain of North Gyeongsang Province, eastern South Korea. It has an elevation of 688 metres.

== See also ==
- List of mountains of Korea
