= Seongaksan =

Mountain in South Korea

Coordinates: 35°40′N 127°27′E

Highest point
- Elevation: 1,141 m (3,743 ft)

Geography
- Location: North Jeolla Province, South Korea

Seongaksan is a mountain of North Jeolla Province, western South Korea. It has an elevation of 1,141 metres.

== See also ==
- List of mountains of Korea
