= Jakseongsan =

Mountain in South Korea

Coordinates: 37°02′N 128°13′E

Highest point
- Elevation: 846 m (2,776 ft)

Geography
- Location: South Korea

Jakseongsan is a mountain of South Korea. It has an elevation of 846 metres.

== See also ==
- List of mountains of Korea
