= Undalsan =

South Korean mountain

Coordinates: 36°45′N 128°12′E

Highest point
- Elevation: 1,097 m (3,599 ft)

Geography
- Location: North Gyeongsang Province, South Korea

Undalsan is a mountain of North Gyeongsang Province, eastern South Korea. It has an elevation of 1,097 metres.

== See also ==
- List of mountains of Korea
