= Uamsan =

Mountain of South Korea

Coordinates: 36°38′53″N 127°30′22″E

Uamsan (우암산; 牛岩山) is a 353.2-meter (1,159 ft) peak in Cheongju, South Korea. It belongs to the Hannamgeumbukjeongmaek (한남금북정맥) mountain range.
