= Palgaksan =

Mountain in South Korea

Coordinates: 36°21′N 129°16′E

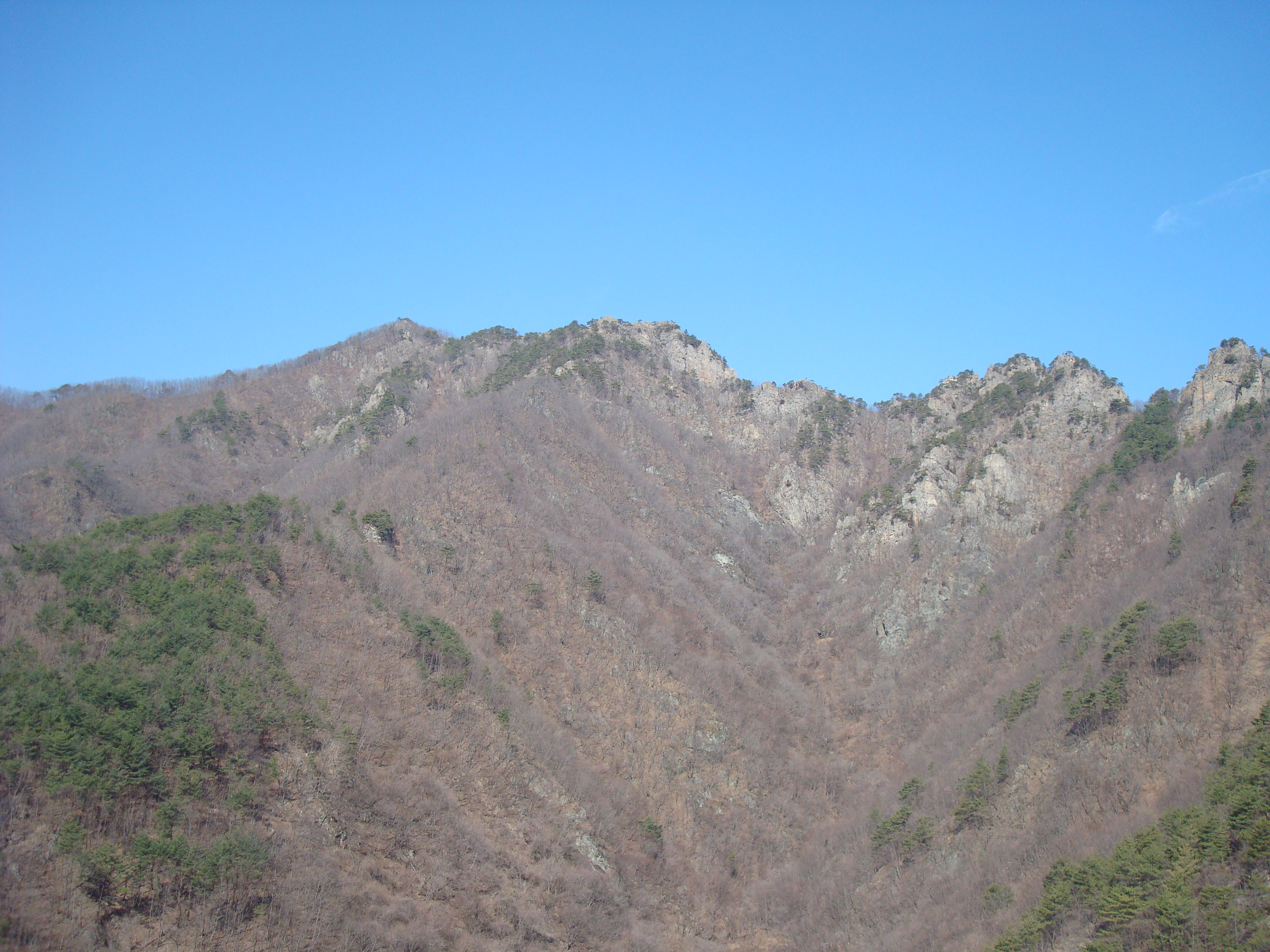

Highest point
- Elevation: 633 m (2,077 ft)

Geography
- Location: North Gyeongsang Province, South Korea

Palgaksan is a mountain of North Gyeongsang Province, eastern South Korea. It has an elevation of 633 metres.

== See also ==
- List of mountains of Korea
