= Jamdusan =

Mountain in Gangwon-do, South Korea

Highest point
- Elevation: 1,243 m (4,078 ft)

Geography
- Location: South Korea

Korean name
- Hangul: 잠두산
- Hanja: 蠶頭山
- RR: Jamdusan
- MR: Chamdusan

Jamdusan (Korean: 잠두산) is a mountain in Pyeongchang County, Gangwon Province, South Korea. The mountain has an elevation of 1,243 m (4,078 ft).

== See also ==
- List of mountains in Korea
