= Namdeogyusan =

Mountain in South Korea

Highest point
- Elevation: 1,507 m (4,944 ft)

Geography
- Location: North Jeolla Province, South Korea

Namdeogyusan is a mountain of North Jeolla Province, western South Korea. It has an elevation of 1,507 metres.

== See also ==
- List of mountains of Korea
