= Seogiamsan =

Mountain in South Korea

Highest point
- Elevation: 970 m (3,180 ft)

Geography
- Location: South Korea

Seogiamsan is a mountain of South Korea. It has an elevation of 970 metres.

== See also ==
- List of mountains of Korea
