= Geumwonsan =

Mountain in South Korea

Highest point
- Elevation: 1,353 m (4,439 ft)

Geography
- Location: South Gyeongsang Province, South Korea

Korean name
- Hangul: 금원산
- Hanja: 金猿山
- RR: Geumwonsan
- MR: Kŭmwŏnsan

Geumwonsan (Korean: 금원산) is a mountain of South Gyeongsang Province, southeastern South Korea. It has an elevation of 1,353 metres.

== See also ==
- List of mountains of Korea
