= Seolheulsan =

Mountain in South Korea

Coordinates: 34°44′N 127°54′E

Geography
- Location: South Gyeongsang Province, South Korea

Seolheulsan is a mountain of South Gyeongsang Province, southeastern South Korea. It has an altitude of 488 metres.

== See also ==
- List of mountains of Korea
