= Heukseoksan =

Mountain in South Korea

Coordinates: 34°40′33.42″N 126°37′59.16″E

Highest point
- Elevation: 650 m (2,130 ft)

Geography
- Location: South Jeolla Province, South Korea

Heukseoksan (Korean: 흑석산) is a mountain of South Jeolla Province, southwestern South Korea. It has an elevation of 650 metres.

== See also ==
- List of mountains of Korea
