= Bongdaesan =

Mountain in South Korea

Coordinates: 35°3′12.4″N 128°10′45.7″E

Highest point
- Elevation: 409 m (1,342 ft)

Geography
- Location: South Gyeongsang Province, South Korea

Korean name
- Hangul: 봉대산
- Hanja: 烽臺山
- RR: Bongdaesan
- MR: Pongdaesan

Bongdaesan (Korean: 봉대산) is a mountain of South Gyeongsang Province, southeastern South Korea. It has an elevation of 409 metres.

== See also ==
- List of mountains of Korea
