= Paryeongsan =

Mountain in South Korea

Highest point
- Elevation: 609 m (1,998 ft)

Geography
- Location: South Jeolla Province, South Korea

Paryeongsan is a mountain of South Jeolla Province, southwestern South Korea. It has an elevation of 609 metres (1,998 ft).

== See also ==
- List of mountains of Korea
