= Palbongsan (South Chungcheong) =

Mountain in South Korea

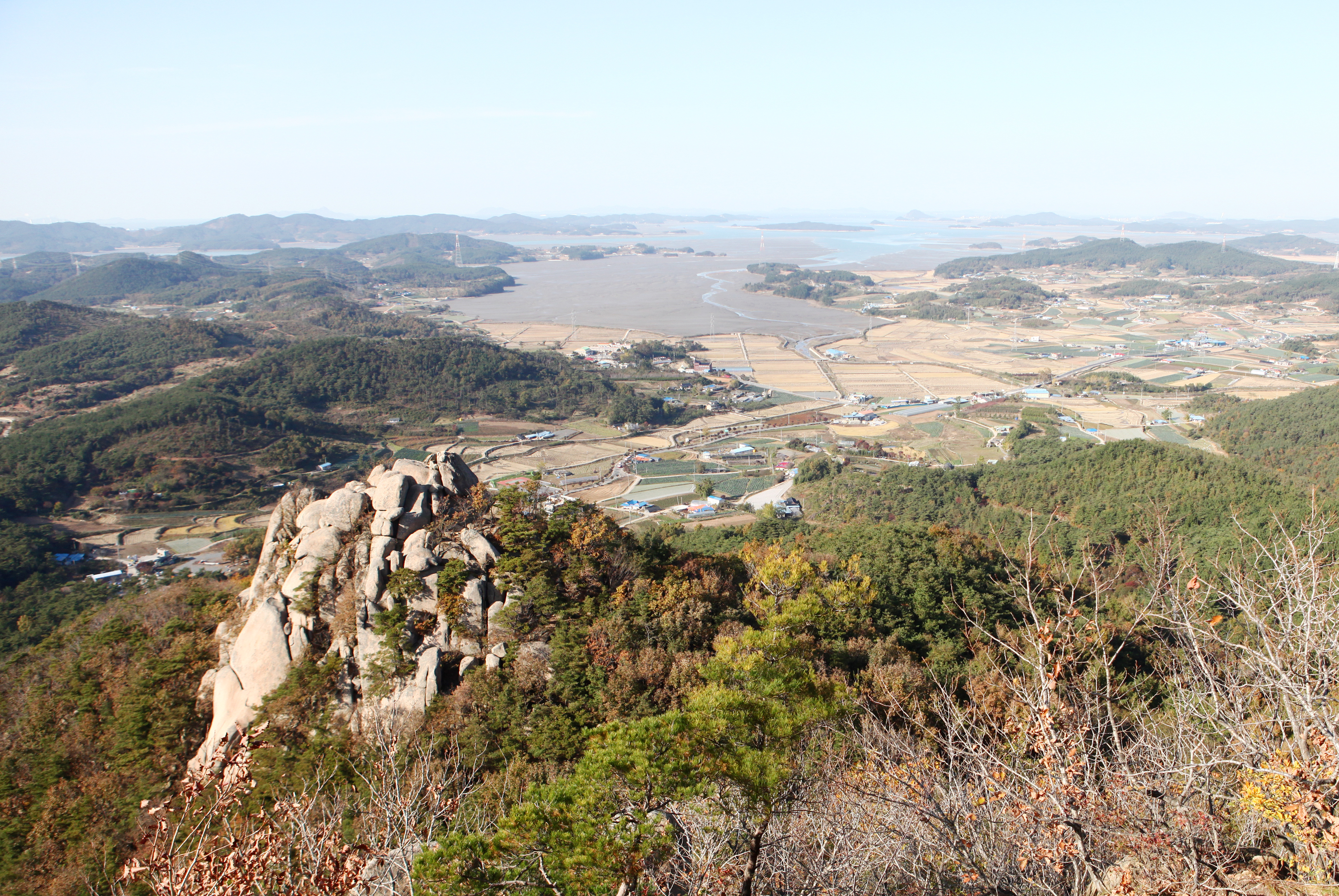
- Palbong Mountain

Highest point
- Elevation: 392 m (1,286 ft)

Geography
- Location: South Chungcheong Province, South Korea

Palbongsan is a mountain in South Chungcheong Province, western South Korea. It has an elevation of 382 metres (1,253 ft).

== See also ==
- List of mountains of Korea
