= Barangsan =

Mountain in South Korea

Highest point
- Elevation: 555 m (1,821 ft)
- Coordinates: 36.13°N 127.27°E

Geography
- Location: South Chungcheong Province, South Korea

Korean name
- Hangul: 바랑산
- Hanja: 바랑山
- RR: Barangsan
- MR: Parangsan

Barangsan is a mountain of South Chungcheong Province, western South Korea. It has an elevation of 555 metres.

== See also ==
- List of mountains of Korea
