= Baraebong =

Mountain in South Korea

Highest point
- Elevation: 1,165 m (3,822 ft)
- Coordinates: 35.43°N 127.56°E

Geography
- Location: North Jeolla Province, South Korea

Korean name
- Hangul: 바래봉
- Hanja: 바래峰
- RR: Baraebong
- MR: Paraebong

Baraebong is a mountain of North Jeolla Province, western South Korea. It has an elevation of 1,165 metres.

== See also ==
- List of mountains of Korea
