= Bawisan =

Mountain in Gangwon Province, South Korea

Coordinates: 37°57′N 127°58′E

Highest point
- Elevation: 858 m (2,815 ft)

Geography
- Location: South Korea

Korean name
- Hangul: 바위산
- Hanja: 바위山
- RR: Bawisan
- MR: Pawisan

Bawisan (Korean: 바위산) is a mountain in Chuncheon, Gangwon Province, South Korea. It has an elevation of 858 m (2,815 ft).

== See also ==
- List of mountains in Korea
