= Chilhyeonsan (South Gyeongsang) =

Mountain in South Korea

Coordinates: 37°01′N 127°24′E

Chilhyeonsan (Gyeongsangnam-do)

Highest point
- Elevation: 349 m (1,145 ft)

Geography
- Location: South Gyeongsang Province, South Korea

Korean name
- Hangul: 칠현산
- Hanja: 七絃山
- RR: Chilhyeonsan
- MR: Ch'irhyŏnsan

Chilhyeonsan (Korean: 칠현산) is a mountain of South Gyeongsang Province, southeastern South Korea. It has an elevation of 349 metres.

== See also ==
- List of mountains of Korea
