= Janggunbawisan =

Mountain in South Korea

Highest point
- Elevation: 1,140 m (3,740 ft)

Geography
- Location: South Korea

Janggunbawisan (Korean: 장군바위산) is a mountain of South Korea. It has an elevation of 1,140 metres

== See also ==
- List of mountains of Korea
