= Dojangsan (North Gyeongsang) =

Mountain of North Gyeongsang Province, South Korea

Coordinates: 38°02′N 128°39′E

Highest point
- Elevation: 828 m (2,717 ft)

Geography
- Location: North Gyeongsang Province, South Korea

Dojangsan (Korean: 도장산) is a mountain of North Gyeongsang Province, eastern South Korea. It has an elevation of 828 metres.

== See also ==
- List of mountains of Korea
