= Wonhyosan =

Mountain in South Korea

Coordinates: 35°24′N 129°06′E

Highest point
- Elevation: 922 m (3,025 ft)

Geography
- Location: South Gyeongsang Province, South Korea

Wonhyosan is a mountain of South Gyeongsang Province, southeastern South Korea. It has an elevation of 922 metres.

== See also ==
- List of mountains of Korea
