= Mangsan =

Mountain in South Korea

Highest point
- Elevation: 406 m (1,332 ft)
- Coordinates: 35°47′39″N 129°11′13″E

Geography
- Location: South Gyeongsang Province, South Korea

Mangsan is a mountain of South Gyeongsang Province, southeastern South Korea. It has an elevation of 406 metres.

== See also ==
- List of mountains of Korea
