= Jatbong =

Mountain in Yeongwol, South Korea

Highest point
- Elevation: 537 m (1,762 ft)

Geography
- Location: South Korea

Korean name
- Hangul: 잣봉
- Hanja: 잣峰
- RR: Jatbong
- MR: Chatpong

Jatbong (Korean: 잣봉) is a mountain in Yeongwol County, Gangwon Province, South Korea. It has an elevation of 537 m (1,762 ft).

== See also ==
- List of mountains in Korea
