= Deoktaesan =

Mountain in South Korea

Coordinates: 35°41′N 127°27′E

Highest point
- Elevation: 1,113 m (3,652 ft)

Geography
- Location: North Jeolla Province, South Korea

Korean name
- Hangul: 덕태산
- Hanja: 德泰山
- RR: Deoktaesan
- MR: Tŏkt'aesan

Deoktaesan (Korean: 덕태산) is a mountain of North Jeolla Province, western South Korea. It has an elevation of 1,113 metres.

== See also ==
- List of mountains of Korea
