= Nambyeongsan =

Mountain in the county of Pyeongchang, Gangwon-do, South Korea

Highest point
- Elevation: 1,149.7 m (3,772 ft)

Geography
- Location: South Korea

Korean name
- Hangul: 남병산
- Hanja: 南屛山
- RR: Nambyeongsan
- MR: Nambyŏngsan

Nambyeongsan (Korean: 남병산) is a mountain in Pyeongchang County, Gangwon Province, South Korea. It has an elevation of 1,149.7 m (3,772 ft).

== See also ==
- List of mountains in Korea
