= Obongsan (Wondo) =

Mountain of Jeollanam-do, South Korea

Highest point
- Elevation: 644 m (2,113 ft)

Geography
- Location: South Jeolla Province, South Korea

Obongsan is a mountain of South Jeolla Province, southwestern South Korea. It has an elevation of 644 metres.

== See also ==
- List of mountains of Korea
