= Bulgapsan =

Mountain in South Korea

Highest point
- Elevation: 516 m (1,693 ft)

Geography
- Location: South Jeolla Province, South Korea

Korean name
- Hangul: 불갑산
- Hanja: 佛甲山
- RR: Bulgapsan
- MR: Pulgapsan

Bulgapsan (Korean: 불갑산) is a mountain of South Jeolla Province, western South Korea. It has an elevation of 516 metres.

== See also ==
- List of mountains of Korea
