= Bulmosan =

Mountain in South Korea

Coordinates: 35°10′N 128°44′E

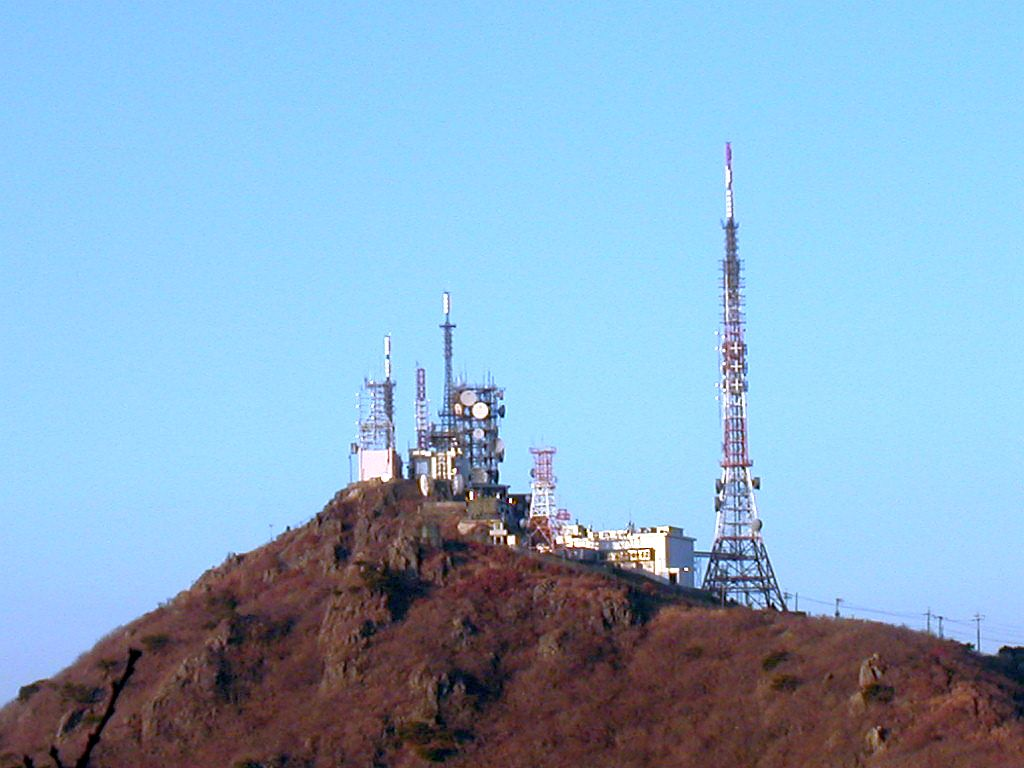

Highest point
- Elevation: 801.7 m (2,630 ft)

Geography
- Location: South Gyeongsang Province, South Korea

Korean name
- Hangul: 불모산
- Hanja: 佛母山
- RR: Bulmosan
- MR: Pulmosan

Bulmosan (Korean: 불모산) is a mountain of South Gyeongsang Province, southeastern South Korea. It has an elevation of 801.7 metres.

There is a KT relay station on top of Bulmosan, visible from the ground.

== See also ==
- List of mountains of Korea
