= Daeyasan =

Mountain in South Korea

Coordinates: 36°40′14″N 127°55′57″E

Highest point
- Elevation: 931 m (3,054 ft)

Geography
- Location: South Korea

Daeyasan (Korean: 대야산) is a mountain of South Korea. It has an elevation of 931 metres.

== See also ==
- List of mountains of Korea
