= Gibaeksan =

Mountain in South Korea

Highest point
- Elevation: 1,331 m (4,367 ft)

Geography
- Location: South Gyeongsang Province, South Korea

Gibaeksan (Korean: 기백산) is a mountain of South Gyeongsang Province, southeastern South Korea. It has an elevation of 1,331 metres.

== See also ==
- List of mountains of Korea
