= Jungwonsan =

Mountain in South Korea

Highest point
- Elevation: 800 m (2,600 ft)
- Coordinates: 37°34′N 127°36′E

Geography
- Location: South Korea

Korean name
- Hangul: 중원산
- Hanja: 中元山
- RR: Jungwonsan
- MR: Chungwŏnsan

Jungwonsan (Korean: 중원산) is a mountain in Yangpyeong County, Gyeonggi Province, in South Korea. It has an elevation of 800 m (2,625 ft).

== See also ==
- List of mountains in Korea
