= Haseolsan =

Mountain in South Korea

Highest point
- Elevation: 1,027 m (3,369 ft)

Geography
- Location: South Korea

Haseolsan is a mountain of South Korea. It has an elevation of 1,027 metres.

== See also ==
- List of mountains of Korea
