= Mireuksan (North Gyeongsang) =

Mountain in South Korea

Highest point
- Elevation: 901 m (2,956 ft)

Geography
- Location: North Gyeongsang Province, South Korea

Mireuksan is a mountain of North Gyeongsang Province, eastern South Korea. It has an elevation of 901 metres.

== See also ==
- List of mountains of Korea
