= Sangjeongbawisan =

Mountain in South Korea

Highest point
- Elevation: 1,006 m (3,301 ft)

Geography
- Location: South Korea

Sangjeongbawisan is a mountain of South Korea. It has an elevation of 1,006 metres.

== See also ==
- List of mountains of Korea
