= Jewangsan =

Mountain in Gangwon Province, South Korea

Highest point
- Elevation: 840.6 m (2,758 ft)
- Coordinates: 34°44′N 127°22′E

Geography
- Location: South Korea

Korean name
- Hangul: 제왕산
- Hanja: 帝王山
- RR: Jewangsan
- MR: Chewangsan

Jewangsan (Korean: 제왕산) is a mountain between Pyeongchang County and Gangneung, Gangwon Province, South Korea. It has an elevation of 840.6 m (2,758 ft).

== See also ==
- List of mountains in Korea
