= Yeohangsan =

Mountain in South Korea

Highest point
- Elevation: 770 m (2,530 ft)
- Coordinates: 35°11′46″N 128°24′23″E

Geography
- Location: South Gyeongsang Province, South Korea

Yeohangsan is a mountain of South Gyeongsang Province, southeastern South Korea. It has an elevation of 770 metres (2,526 ft).

== See also ==
- List of mountains of Korea
