= Guwangbong =

Mountain in South Korea

Highest point
- Elevation: 1,245 m (4,085 ft)
- Coordinates: 36.717225°N 127.990495°E

Geography
- Location: South Korea

Korean name
- Hangul: 구왕봉
- Hanja: 九王峰
- RR: Guwangbong
- MR: Kuwangbong

Guwangbong (Korean: 구왕봉) is a mountain of South Korea. It has an elevation of 1,245 metres (4,085 ft).

== See also ==
- List of mountains of Korea
