= Myeongbongsan =

Mountain in South Korea

Highest point
- Elevation: 599 m (1,965 ft)
- Coordinates: 37.736°N 126.856°E

Geography
- Location: South Korea

Korean name
- Hangul: 명봉산
- Hanja: 鳴鳳山
- RR: Myeongbongsan
- MR: Myŏngbongsan

Myeongbongsan (Korean: 명봉산) is a mountain in Wonju, Gangwon Province, South Korea. It has an elevation of 599 m (1,965 ft).

== See also ==
- List of mountains in Korea

== Notes ==
- Yu, Jeong-yeol (2007). 한국의 산 여행 [Travel Guide to Korean Mountains] (in Korean). Seoul: 관동 상억연구회 (Kwandong). ISBN 978-89-958055-1-0.
