= Sangsan =

Mountain in South Korea

Coordinates: 37°58′N 127°09′E

Highest point
- Elevation: 825 m (2,707 ft)

Geography
- Location: South Korea

Sangsan is a mountain of South Korea. It has an elevation of 825 metres.

== See also ==
- List of mountains of Korea
