= Chilgapsan =

Mountain in South Korea

Highest point
- Elevation: 561 m (1,841 ft)
- Listing: Mountains of Korea
- Coordinates: 36°24′48″N 126°53′03″E

Geography
- Country: South Korea
- Province: South Chungcheong

Chilgapsan is a mountain of South Chungcheong Province, western South Korea. It has an elevation of 561 metres.
