= Cheongwansan =

Mountain in South Korea

Highest point
- Elevation: 723 m (2,372 ft)
- Listing: Mountains of Korea
- Coordinates: 34°31′56″N 126°54′57″E

Geography
- Country: South Korea
- Province: South Jeolla

Korean name
- Hangul: 천관산
- Hanja: 天冠山
- RR: Cheongwansan
- MR: Ch'ŏn'gwansan

Cheongwansan (Korean: 천관산) is a mountain located in South Jeolla Province, South Korea. It has an elevation of 723 metres (2,372 ft).
