= Poseongbong =

Mountain in South Korea

Highest point
- Elevation: 933 m (3,061 ft)
- Coordinates: 36°18′08″N 127°54′19″E

Geography
- Location: South Korea

Poseongbong is a mountain of South Korea. It has an elevation of 933 metres.

== See also ==
- List of mountains of Korea
