= Geumjeonsan =

Mountain in South Korea

Coordinates: 34°55′N 127°21′E

Highest point
- Elevation: 668 m (2,192 ft)

Geography
- Location: South Jeolla Province, South Korea

Korean name
- Hangul: 금전산
- Hanja: 金錢山
- RR: Geumjeonsan
- MR: Kŭmjŏnsan

Geumjeonsan (Korean: 금전산) is a mountain of South Jeolla Province, southwestern South Korea. It has an elevation of 668 metres.

== See also ==
- List of mountains of Korea
