= Bakjwibong =

Mountain in South Korea

Highest point
- Elevation: 782 m (2,566 ft)

Geography
- Location: South Korea

Korean name
- Hangul: 박쥐봉
- Hanja: 박쥐峰
- RR: Bakjwibong
- MR: Pakchwibong

Bakjwibong (Korean: 박쥐봉) is a mountain in Chungju, North Chungcheong Province in South Korea. It has an elevation of 782 m (2,566 ft).

== See also ==
- List of mountains in Korea
