= Neunggyeongbong =

Mountain in South Korea

Highest point
- Elevation: 1,123.2 m (3,685 ft)
- Coordinates: 37.673°N 128.765°E

Geography
- Location: South Korea

Korean name
- Hangul: 능경봉
- Hanja: 陵京峰
- RR: Neunggyeongbong
- MR: Nŭnggyŏngbong

Neunggyeongbong (Korean: 능경봉) is a mountain in Gangneung, Pyeongchang County, Gangwon Province, South Korea. It has an elevation of 1,123.2 m (3,685 ft).

== See also ==
- List of mountains in Korea
