= Suinsan =

Mountain in South Korea

Coordinates: 34°43′N 126°51′E

Highest point
- Elevation: 561 m (1,841 ft)

Geography
- Location: South Jeolla Province, South Korea

Suinsan is a mountain in the South Jeolla Province of southwestern South Korea. It has an elevation of 561 metres.

== See also ==
- List of mountains of Korea
