= Jagulsan =

Mountain in South Korea

Highest point
- Elevation: 897 m (2,943 ft)

Geography
- Location: South Gyeongsang Province, South Korea

Jagulsan is a mountain of South Gyeongsang Province, southeastern South Korea. It has an elevation of 897 metres.

== See also ==
- List of mountains of Korea
