= Suwolsan =

Mountain in South Korea

Highest point
- Elevation: 128 m (420 ft)

Geography
- Location: South Jeolla Province, South Korea

Suwolsan is a mountain of South Jeolla Province, southwestern South Korea. It has an elevation of 128 metres.

== See also ==
- List of mountains of Korea
