= Hwangcheolbong =

Mountain in South Korea

Highest point
- Elevation: 1,381 m (4,531 ft)

Geography
- Location: South Korea

Hwangcheolbong is a mountain of South Korea. It has an elevation of 1,381 metres

== See also ==
- List of mountains of Korea
