= Gwittaegibong =

Mountain

Highest point
- Elevation: 1,577 m (5,174 ft)

Geography
- Location: South Korea

Gwittaegibong (Korean: 귀때기청봉; Hanja: 귀때기靑峰) is a mountain of South Korea. It has an elevation of 1,577 metres

== See also ==
- List of mountains of Korea
