= Samdobong =

Mountain in South Korea

Highest point
- Elevation: 1,176 m (3,858 ft)

Geography
- Location: South Korea

Samdobong is a mountain of South Korea. It has an elevation of 1,176 metres.

== See also ==
- List of mountains of Korea
