= Jeokjasan =

Mountain in South Korea

Highest point
- Elevation: 435 m (1,427 ft)

Geography
- Location: South Jeolla Province, South Korea

Jeokjasan is a mountain of South Jeolla Province, southwestern South Korea. It has an elevation of 435 metres.

== See also ==
- List of mountains of Korea
