= Seungdusan =

Mountain in South Korea

Highest point
- Elevation: 1,013 m (3,323 ft)

Geography
- Location: South Korea

Korean name
- Hangul: 승두산
- Hanja: 僧頭山
- RR: Seungdusan
- MR: Sŭngdusan

Seungdusan (Korean: 승두산) is a mountain in Pyeongchang County, Gangwon Province, South Korea. It has an elevation of 1,013 m (3,323 ft).

== See also ==
- List of mountains in Korea
