= Indeungsan =

Mountain in South Korea

Coordinates: 37°03′N 128°00′E

Highest point
- Elevation: 666 m (2,185 ft)

Geography
- Location: South Korea

Indeungsan is a mountain of South Korea. It has an elevation of 666 metres.

== See also ==
- List of mountains of Korea
