= Seongsusan =

Mountain in South Korea

Highest point
- Elevation: 1,059 m (3,474 ft)

Geography
- Location: North Jeolla Province, South Korea

Seongsusan is a mountain of North Jeolla Province, western South Korea. It has an elevation of 1,059 metres.

== See also ==
- List of mountains of Korea
