= Wangsirubong =

Mountain in South Korea

Highest point
- Elevation: 1,243 m (4,078 ft)

Geography
- Location: South Jeolla Province, South Korea

Wangsirubong is a mountain of South Jeolla Province, southwestern South Korea. It has an elevation of 1,243 metres.

== See also ==
- List of mountains of Korea
