= Unjangsan =

Mountain in South Korea

Coordinates: 35°54′39″N 127°21′26″E

Highest point
- Elevation: 1,126 m (3,694 ft)

Geography
- Location: North Jeolla Province, South Korea

Unjangsan is a mountain of North Jeolla Province, western South Korea. It has an elevation of 1,126 metres.

== See also ==
- List of mountains of Korea
