= Domyeongsan =

Mountain in South Korea

Coordinates: 36°39′N 127°49′E

Highest point
- Elevation: 642 m (2,106 ft)

Geography
- Location: North Chungcheong Province, South Korea

Korean name
- Hangul: 도명산
- Hanja: 道明山
- RR: Domyeongsan
- MR: Tomyŏngsan

Domyeongsan (Korean: 도명산) is a mountain of North Chungcheong Province, South Korea. It has an elevation of 642 metres (2,106 ft). Near the summit is a statue of Maitreya Buddha, presumably from the early Goryeo dynasty.

== See also ==
- List of mountains of Korea
