= Geumdangsan =

Mountain in Pyeongchang, South Korea

Highest point
- Elevation: 1,173 m (3,848 ft)
- Coordinates: 35°07′N 126°53′E

Geography
- Location: South Korea

Korean name
- Hangul: 금당산
- Hanja: 金堂山
- RR: Geumdangsan
- MR: Kŭmdangsan

Geumdangsan (Korean: 금당산) is a mountain in Pyeongchang County, Gangwon Province, South Korea. It has an elevation of 1,173 m (3,848 ft).

== See also ==
- List of mountains in Korea
