= Jangseongbong =

Mountain in South Korea

Coordinates: 36.7022°N 127.9551°E

Highest point
- Elevation: 916 m (3,005 ft)

Geography
- Location: South Korea

Jangseongbong is a mountain in South Korea. It has an elevation of 916 meters.

== See also ==
- List of mountains of Korea
