= Seonbawisan =

Mountain in South Korea

Coordinates: 36°23′N 127°02′E

Highest point
- Elevation: 1,042 m (3,419 ft)

Geography
- Location: South Korea

Seonbawisan is a mountain of South Korea. It has an elevation of 1,042 metres.

== See also ==
- List of mountains of Korea
