= Gyeonggaksan =

Mountain in South Korea

Coordinates: 35°44′N 127°10′E

Geography
- Location: North Jeolla Province, South Korea

Korean name
- Hangul: 경각산
- Hanja: 鯨角山
- RR: Gyeonggaksan
- MR: Kyŏnggaksan

Gyeonggaksan (Korean: 경각산) is a mountain of North Jeolla Province, South Korea. It has an altitude of 659 metres.

== See also ==
- List of mountains of Korea
