= Nagyeongsan =

Mountain in South Korea

Coordinates: 36°38′N 127°49′E

Highest point
- Elevation: 740 m (2,430 ft)

Geography
- Location: South Korea

Nagyeongsan is a mountain of South Korea. It has an elevation of 740 metres.

== See also ==
- List of mountains of Korea
