= Tongosan =

Mountain in South Korea

Highest point
- Elevation: 1,067 m (3,501 ft)

Geography
- Location: North Gyeongsang Province, South Korea

Tongosan is a mountain of North Gyeongsang Province, eastern South Korea. It has an elevation of 1,067 metres.

== See also ==
- List of mountains of Korea
