= Haemyeongsan =

Mountain in Incheon, South Korea

Highest point
- Elevation: 309 m (1,014 ft)
- Coordinates: 37°41′N 126°21′E

Geography
- Location: South Korea

Korean name
- Hangul: 해명산
- Hanja: 海明山
- RR: Haemyeongsan
- MR: Haemyŏngsan

Haemyeongsan (Korean: 해명산) is a mountain in Incheon, South Korea. It is on the island of Seongmodo in Ganghwa County. The mountain has an elevation of 309 m (1,014 ft).

== See also ==
- List of mountains in Korea
