= Samjeongsan =

Mountain of Jeollanam-do, South Korea

Coordinates: 35°44′N 128°39′E

Highest point
- Elevation: 1,225 m (4,019 ft)

Geography
- Location: South Jeolla Province, South Korea

Samjeongsan is a mountain of South Jeolla Province, southwestern South Korea. It has an elevation of 1,225 metres.

== See also ==
- List of mountains of Korea
