= Wolseongbong =

Mountain in South Korea

Highest point
- Elevation: 904 m (2,966 ft)

Geography
- Location: South Chungcheong Province, South Korea

Wolseongbong is a mountain of South Chungcheong Province, western South Korea. It has an elevation of 904 metres.

== See also ==
- List of mountains of Korea
