= Hwangjangsan =

Mountain in South Korea

Coordinates: 36°48′47″N 128°16′34″E

Highest point
- Elevation: 1,077 m (3,533 ft)

Geography
- Location: North Gyeongsang Province, South Korea

Hwangjangsan is a mountain of North Gyeongsang Province, eastern South Korea. It has an elevation of 1,077 metres.

== See also ==
- List of mountains of Korea
