= Obongsan (Haman and Jinju) =

Mountain in South Korea

Highest point
- Elevation: 525 m (1,722 ft)

Geography
- Location: South Gyeongsang Province, South Korea

Obongsan is a mountain of South Gyeongsang Province, southeastern South Korea. It has an elevation of 525 metres.

== See also ==
- List of mountains of Korea
