= Bigyesan =

Mountain in South Korea

Highest point
- Elevation: 1,126 m (3,694 ft)

Geography
- Location: South Gyeongsang Province, South Korea

Bigyesan (Korean: 비계산) is a mountain of South Gyeongsang Province, southeastern South Korea. It has an elevation of 1,126 metres.

== See also ==
- List of mountains of Korea
