= Bonghwangsan (North Gyeongsang) =

Mountain in South Korea

Highest point
- Elevation: 819 m (2,687 ft)

Geography
- Location: North Gyeongsang Province, South Korea

Korean name
- Hangul: 봉황산
- Hanja: 鳳凰山
- RR: Bonghwangsan
- MR: Ponghwangsan

Bonghwangsan (Korean: 봉황산) is a mountain of North Gyeongsang Province, eastern South Korea. It has an elevation of 819 metres.

== See also ==
- List of mountains of Korea
