= Gunjasan =

Mountain in South Korea

Coordinates: 38°05′N 127°03′E

Geography
- Location: South Korea

Gunjasan is a mountain of South Korea. It has an altitude of 948 metres.

== See also ==
- List of mountains of Korea
