= Gubyeongsan =

Mountain in South Korea

Coordinates: 36°28′10″N 127°51′42″E

Highest point
- Elevation: 876 m (2,874 ft)

Geography
- Location: North Chungcheong Province, South Korea

Gubyeongsan is a mountain of North Chungcheong Province, South Korea. It has an elevation of 876 metres.

== See also ==
- List of mountains of Korea
