= Gwaegwansan =

South Korean Mountain

Highest point
- Elevation: 1,252 m (4,108 ft)

Geography
- Location: South Gyeongsang Province, South Korea

Korean name
- Hangul: 괘관산
- Hanja: 掛冠山
- RR: Gwaegwansan
- MR: Kwaegwansan

Gwaegwansan (Korean: 괘관산) is a mountain of South Gyeongsang Province, southeastern South Korea. It has an elevation of 1,252 metres.

== See also ==
- List of mountains of Korea
