= Jukyeopsan =

Mountain in South Korea

Highest point
- Elevation: 859 m (2,818 ft)

Geography
- Location: South Korea

Jukyeopsan is a mountain of South Korea. It has an elevation of 859 metres.

== See also ==
- List of mountains of Korea
