= Cheonjusan =

Mountain in South Korea

Coordinates: 37°55′N 127°15′E

Highest point
- Elevation: 824 m (2,703 ft)

Geography
- Location: North Gyeongsang Province, South Korea

Korean name
- Hangul: 천주산
- Hanja: 天柱山
- RR: Cheonjusan
- MR: Ch'ŏnjusan

Cheonjusan (Korean: 천주산) is a mountain of North Gyeongsang Province, eastern South Korea. It has an elevation of 824 metres.

== See also ==
- List of mountains of Korea
