= Seongjisan =

Mountain in South Korea

Highest point
- Elevation: 791 m (2,595 ft)

Geography
- Location: South Korea

Seongjisan is a mountain of South Korea. It has an elevation of 791 metres.

== See also ==
- List of mountains of Korea
