= Jebibong =

Mountain in South Korea

Highest point
- Elevation: 710 m (2,330 ft)

Geography
- Location: South Korea

Jebibong is a mountain of South Korea. It has an elevation of 710 metres.

== See also ==
- List of mountains of Korea
