= Jeoksangsan =

Mountain in South Korea

Coordinates: 35°56′52″N 127°41′28″E

Highest point
- Elevation: 1,034 m (3,392 ft)

Geography
- Location: North Jeolla Province, South Korea

Jeoksangsan is a mountain of North Jeolla Province, western South Korea. It has an elevation of 1,034 metres.

== See also ==
- List of mountains of Korea
