= Boryeonsan =

Mountain in Chungju, South Korea

Coordinates: 37°04′N 127°47′E

Highest point
- Elevation: 765 m (2,510 ft)

Geography
- Location: South Korea

Korean name
- Hangul: 보련산
- Hanja: 寶蓮山
- RR: Boryeonsan
- MR: Poryŏnsan

Boryeonsan (Korean: 보련산) is a mountain in Chungju, South Korea. It has an elevation of 765 m (2,510 ft).

== See also ==
- List of mountains in Korea
