= Majeoksan =

Mountain in South Korea

Coordinates: 37°57′N 127°48′E

Highest point
- Elevation: 605.2 m (1,986 ft)

Geography
- Location: South Korea

Korean name
- Hangul: 마적산
- Hanja: 馬蹟山
- RR: Majeoksan
- MR: Majŏksan

Majeoksan (Korean: 마적산) is a mountain in Chuncheon, Gangwon Province, South Korea. It has an elevation of 605.2 m (1,986 ft).

== See also ==
- List of mountains in Korea
