= Mansusan =

Mountain in South Korea

Coordinates: 37°36′N 126°41′E

Highest point
- Elevation: 575 m (1,886 ft)

Geography
- Location: South Chungcheong Province, South Korea

Mansusan is a mountain of South Chungcheong Province, western South Korea. It has an elevation of 575 metres.

== See also ==
- List of mountains of Korea
