= Naeyeonsan =

Mountain in South Korea

Coordinates: 36°15′58″N 129°15′39″E

Highest point
- Elevation: 710 m (2,330 ft)

Geography
- Location: North Gyeongsang Province, South Korea

Naeyeonsan is a mountain of North Gyeongsang Province in eastern South Korea. It has an elevation of 710 metres.

== See also ==
- List of mountains of Korea
