= Jarimangsan =

Mountain in South Korea

Highest point
- Elevation: 398 m (1,306 ft)

Geography
- Location: South Gyeongsang Province, South Korea

Jarimangsan is a mountain of South Gyeongsang Province, southeastern South Korea. It has an elevation of 398 metres.

== See also ==
- List of mountains of Korea
