= Daebawisan =

Mountain in South Korea

Daebawisan (Gangwon-do)

Geography
- Location: South Korea

Korean name
- Hangul: 대바위산
- Hanja: 大바위山
- RR: Daebawisan
- MR: Taebawisan

Daebawisan (Korean: 대바위산) is a mountain of South Korea. It has an altitude of 1091 metres

== See also ==
- List of mountains of Korea
