= Doraksan =

Mountain in South Korea

Coordinates: 36°51′22″N 128°18′42″E

Highest point
- Elevation: 964 m (3,163 ft)

Geography
- Location: North Chungcheong Province, South Korea

Doraksan (Korean: 도락산) is a mountain of North Chungcheong Province, South Korea. It has an elevation of 964 metres.

== See also ==
- List of mountains of Korea
