= Wangdusan =

Mountain in South Korea

Coordinates: 36°59′N 128°55′E

Highest point
- Elevation: 1,044 m (3,425 ft)

Geography
- Location: North Gyeongsang Province, South Korea

Wangdusan is a mountain of North Gyeongsang Province, eastern South Korea. It has an elevation of 1,044 metres.

== See also ==
- List of mountains of Korea
