= Dongaksan =

Mountain in South Korea

Coordinates: 35°54′N 129°29′E

Highest point
- Elevation: 745 m (2,444 ft)

Geography
- Location: South Jeolla Province, South Korea

Korean name
- Hangul: 동악산
- Hanja: 動樂山
- RR: Dongaksan
- MR: Tongaksan

Dongaksan (Korean: 동악산) is a mountain of South Jeolla Province, western South Korea. It has an elevation of 745 metres (2,444 ft).

== See also ==
- List of mountains of Korea
