= Johangsan =

Mountain range

Coordinates: 36°38′N 127°56′E

Highest point
- Elevation: 951 m (3,120 ft)

Geography
- Location: South Korea

Johangsan is a mountain in South Korea. It has an elevation of 951 metres.

== See also ==
- List of mountains of Korea
