= Jangmisan =

Mountain in Pyeongchang, South Korea

Highest point
- Elevation: 978.8 m (3,211 ft)
- Coordinates: 37°29′N 128°19′E

Geography
- Location: South Korea

Korean name
- Hangul: 장미산
- Hanja: 長美山
- RR: Jangmisan
- MR: Changmisan

Jangmisan (Korean: 장미산) is a mountain in Pyeongchang County, Gangwon Province, South Korea. It has an elevation of 978.8 m (3,211 ft).

== See also ==
- List of mountains in Korea
