= Eoraesan =

Mountain in North Chungcheong, South Korea

Highest point
- Elevation: 1,063 m (3,488 ft)
- Coordinates: 37°04′N 128°39′E

Geography
- Location: North Chungcheong Province, South Korea

Korean name
- Hangul: 어래산
- Hanja: 御來山
- RR: Eoraesan
- MR: Ŏraesan

Eoraesan (Korean: 어래산) is a mountain of North Chungcheong Province, South Korea. It has an elevation of 1,063 metres

== See also ==
- List of mountains of Korea
