= Gwallyongsan =

Mountain in South Korea

Highest point
- Elevation: 739 m (2,425 ft)

Geography
- Location: South Gyeongsang Province, South Korea

Korean name
- Hangul: 관룡산
- Hanja: 觀龍山
- RR: Gwallyongsan
- MR: Kwallyongsan

Gwallyongsan (Korean: 관룡산) is a mountain of South Gyeongsang Province, southeastern South Korea. It has an elevation of 739 metres.

At the base of the mountain is located the site of the Changnyeong Okcheonsa Temple, which is being excavated.

== See also ==
- List of mountains of Korea
