= Hoeryeongbong =

Mountain in South Korea

Highest point
- Elevation: 1,331 m (4,367 ft)

Geography
- Location: South Korea

Korean name
- Hangul: 회령봉
- Hanja: 會靈峰
- RR: Hoeryeongbong
- MR: Hoeryŏngbong

Hoeryeongbong (Korean: 회령봉) is a mountain in Pyeongchang County, Gangwon Province, South Korea. It has an elevation of 1,331 m (4,367 ft).

== See also ==
- List of mountains in Korea
