= Goribong =

Mountain in South Korea

Highest point
- Elevation: 1,248 m (4,094 ft)

Geography
- Location: South Jeolla Province, South Korea

Korean name
- Hangul: 고리봉
- RR: Goribong
- MR: Koribong

Goribong (Korean: 고리봉) is a mountain of South Jeolla Province, southwestern South Korea. It has an elevation of 1,248 metres.

== See also ==
- List of mountains of Korea
