= Sanghwangbong =

Mountain in South Korea

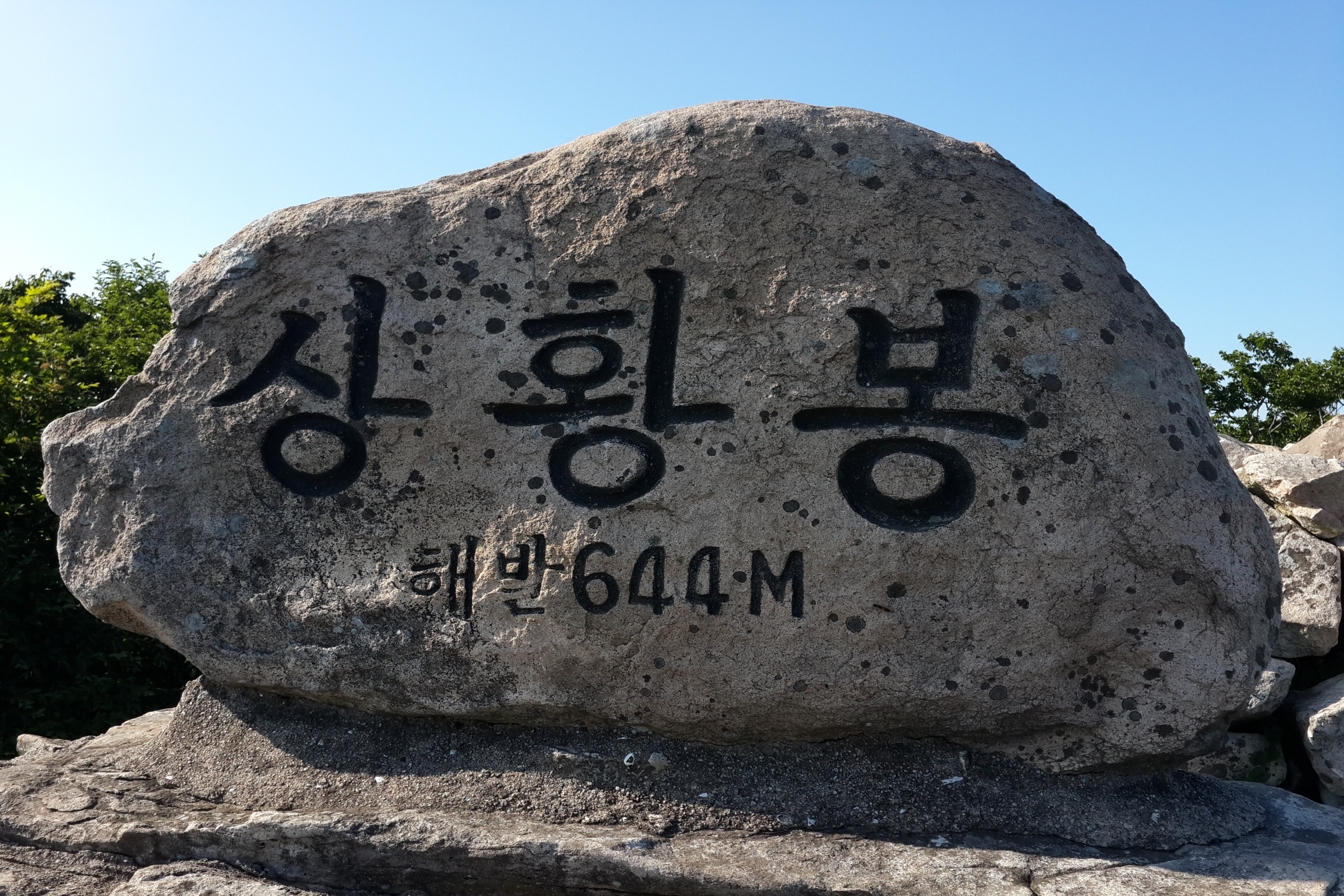

Highest point
- Elevation: 644 m (2,113 ft)

Geography
- Location: South Jeolla Province, South Korea

Sanghwangbong is a mountain of South Jeolla Province, southwestern South Korea. It has an elevation of 644 metres.

== See also ==
- List of mountains of Korea
