= Baegambong =

Mountain in South Korea

Highest point
- Elevation: 1,503 m (4,931 ft)

Geography
- Location: North Jeolla Province, South Korea

Baegambong (Korean: 백암봉) is a mountain of North Jeolla Province, South Korea. It has an elevation of 1,503 metres.

== See also ==
- List of mountains of Korea
