= Hwangbyeongsan =

Mountain in Pyeongchang, South Korea

Highest point
- Elevation: 1,407.1 m (4,616 ft)

Geography
- Location: South Korea

Korean name
- Hangul: 황병산
- Hanja: 黃柄山
- RR: Hwangbyeongsan
- MR: Hwangbyŏngsan

Hwangbyeongsan (Korean: 황병산) is a mountain in Pyeongchang County, Gangwon Province, South Korea. It has an elevation of 1,407.1 m (4,616 ft).

== See also ==
- List of mountains in Korea
