= Manisan (North Chungcheong) =

Mountain of South Korea

Highest point
- Elevation: 640 m (2,100 ft)

Geography
- Location: South Korea

Manisan is a mountain of South Korea. It has an elevation of 640 metres.

== See also ==
- List of mountains of Korea
