= Baegusan =

Mountain in South Korea

Coordinates: 37°51′N 128°05′E

Highest point
- Elevation: 894.7 m (2,935 ft)

Geography
- Location: South Korea

Korean name
- Hangul: 백우산
- Hanja: 白羽山
- RR: Baegusan
- MR: Paegusan

Baegusan (Korean: 백우산) is a mountain in Hongcheon County, Gangwon Province, South Korea. It has an elevation of 894.7 m (2,935 ft).

== See also ==
- List of mountains in Korea
