= Museongsan =

Mountain in South Korea

Coordinates: 37°02′N 126°55′E

Highest point
- Elevation: 614 m (2,014 ft)

Geography
- Location: South Chungcheong Province, South Korea

Museongsan is a mountain of South Chungcheong Province, western South Korea. It has an elevation of 614 metres.

== See also ==
- List of mountains of Korea
