= Naebyeonsan =

Mountain in South Korea

Coordinates: 35°40′N 126°34′E

Highest point
- Elevation: 459 m (1,506 ft)

Geography
- Location: North Jeolla Province, South Korea

Korean name
- Hangul: 내변산
- Hanja: 內邊山
- RR: Naebyeonsan
- MR: Naebyŏnsan

Naebyeonsan (Korean: 내변산) is a mountain of North Jeolla Province, western South Korea. It has an elevation of 459 metres.

== See also ==
- List of mountains of Korea
