= Gongdeoksan =

Mountain in South Korea

Coordinates: 35°18′N 129°08′E

Highest point
- Elevation: 913 m (2,995 ft)

Geography
- Location: North Gyeongsang Province, South Korea

Korean name
- Hangul: 공덕산
- Hanja: 功德山
- RR: Gongdeoksan
- MR: Kongdŏksan

Gongdeoksan is a mountain of North Gyeongsang Province, eastern South Korea. It has an elevation of 913 metres.

== See also ==
- List of mountains of Korea
