= Bakdalsan =

Mountain in South Korea

Coordinates: 37°46′N 126°53′E

Highest point
- Elevation: 825 m (2,707 ft)

Geography
- Location: South Korea

Korean name
- Hangul: 박달산
- Hanja: 朴達山
- RR: Bakdalsan
- MR: Paktalsan

Bakdalsan (Korean: 박달산) is a mountain in Goesan County, North Chungcheong Province, South Korea. It has an elevation of 825 m (2,707 ft).

== See also ==
- List of mountains in Korea
