= Yanggaksan =

Mountain in South Korea

Highest point
- Elevation: 1,130 m (3,710 ft)

Geography
- Location: South Gyeongsang Province, South Korea

Yanggaksan is a mountain of South Gyeongsang Province, southeastern South Korea. It has an elevation of 1,130 metres.

== See also ==
- List of mountains of Korea
