= Hyeongjebong (Sobaeksan) =

Mountain in South Korea

Coordinates: 34°43′N 127°02′E

Highest point
- Elevation: 1,178 m (3,865 ft)

Geography
- Location: South Korea

Hyeongjebong is a mountain of South Korea. It has an elevation of 1,778 metres.

== See also ==
- List of mountains of Korea
