= Makjangbong =

Mountain in South Korea

Highest point
- Elevation: 868 m (2,848 ft)

Geography
- Location: South Korea

Makjangbong is a mountain of South Korea. It has an elevation of 868 metres.

== See also ==
- List of mountains of Korea
