= Duryusan (Gangwon) =

Mountain in Hwacheon, South Korea

Highest point
- Elevation: 993 m (3,258 ft)

Geography
- Location: South Korea

Korean name
- Hangul: 두류산
- Hanja: 頭流山
- RR: Duryusan
- MR: Turyusan

Duryusan (Korean: 두류산) is a mountain in Hwacheon County, Gangwon Province, South Korea. It has an elevation of 993 m (3,258 ft).

== See also ==
- List of mountains in Korea
