= Scenic Sites (South Korea) =

Designated locations of natural beauty

- Hangul: 명승
- Hanja: 名勝
- RR: Myeongseung
- MR: Myŏngsŭng

Scenic Sites (Korean: 명승) is a national-level designation within the heritage preservation system of South Korea for natural places of significant historic, artistic, or scenic value. The system is administered by the Cultural Heritage Administration (CHA), an agency of the South Korean government. The registry was first created in 1979. As of 2020, there are 115 Scenic Sites.

The CHA defines the criteria for inclusion as "Places of natural beauty with great historic, artistic or scenic values, which feature distinctive uniqueness and rarity originated from their formation processes".

== List ==
No. (Note: On November 19, 2021, the Cultural Heritage Administration removed the numbering system for all of its designations, including Scenic Sites. Previously assigned numbers are preserved here for the sake of reference.)	Image	Official name	Location	Dates	Refs
1		Sogeumgang Mountain in Cheonghakdong, Myeongju	Gangneung, Gangwon	1970-11-23	
2		Haegeumgang Islets, Geoje	Geoje, South Gyeongsang	1971-03-23	
3		Gugyedeung Pebble Beach in Jeongdo-ri, Wando	Wando County, South Jeolla	1972-07-26	
4		Buryeongsagyegok Valley, Uljin	Uljin County, North Gyeongsang	1979-12-14	
5		Sangbaekdo and Habaekdo Islets, Yeosu	Yeosu, South Jeolla	1979-12-14	
6		Dumujin Coast on Baengnyeongdo Island, Ongjin	Ongjin County, Incheon	1997-12-30	
7		Jindo Sea Parting	Jindo County, South Jeolla	2000-03-14	
8		Samgaksan Mountain	Goyang, Gyeonggi	2003-10-31	
9		Juwanggyegok Valley in Juwangsan Mountain, Cheongsong	Cheongsong County, North Gyeongsang	2003-10-31	
10		Maisan Mountain, Jinan	Jinan County, North Jeolla	2003-10-31	
11		Chaeseokgang and Jeokbyeokgang Cliffed Coasts, Buan	Buan County, North Jeolla	2004-11-17	
12		Eorayeon Meandering Stream and Surroundings, Yeongwol	Yeongwol County, Gangwon	2004-12-07	
13		Terraced Paddy Fields of Gacheon Village, Namhae	Namhae County, South Gyeongsang	2005-01-03	
14		Hoeryongpo Meandering Stream, Yecheon	Yecheon County, North Gyeongsang	2005-08-23	
15		Taejongdae	Yeongdo District, Busan	2005-11-01	
16		Deungdaeseom Islet of Somaemuldo Island	Tongyeong, South Gyeongsang	2006-08-24	
17		Seonmongdae Pavilion and Surroundings, Yecheon	Yecheon County, North Gyeongsang	2006-11-16	
18		Uirimji Reservoir and Jerim Woods, Jecheon	Jecheon, North Chungcheong	2006-12-04	
19		Gomanaru Ferry Dock, Gongju	Gongju, South Chungcheong	2006-12-04	
20		Beopseongjin Wooded Fort, Yeonggwang	Yeonggwang County, South Jeolla	2007-02-01	
21		Cheongnyangsan Mountain, Bonghwa	Bonghwa County, North Gyeongsang	2007-03-13	
22		Oryukdo Islets, Busan	Nam District, Busan	2007-10-01	
23		Choyeonjeong Garden, Suncheon	Suncheon, South Jeolla	2007-12-07	
24		Baegunjeong Pavilion and Gaehosongsup Pine Grove, Andong	Andong, North Gyeongsang	2007-12-07	
25		Uisangdae Pavilion and Hongnyeonam Hermitage of Naksansa Temple, Yangyang	Yangyang County, Gangwon	2007-12-07	
26		Jukseoru Pavilion and Osipcheon Stream, Samcheok	Samcheok, Gangwon	2007-12-07	
27		Old Path of Guryongnyeong Pass	Yangyang County, Gangwon	2007-12-17	
28		Old Path of Jungnyeong Pass	Yeongju, North Gyeongsang	2007-12-17	
29		Tokkibiri Cliffside Road, Mungyeong	Mungyeong, North Gyeongsang	2007-12-17	
30		Mungyeongsaejae Pass	Mungyeong, North Gyeongsang	2007-12-17	
31		Gwanghalluwon Garden	Namwon, North Jeolla	2008-01-08	
32		Yun Seon-do’s Garden on Bogildo Island	Wando County, South Jeolla	2008-01-08	
33		Baekseokdongcheon Garden in Buam-dong, Seoul	Jongno District, Seoul	2008-01-08	
34		Mureunggyegok Valley, Donghae	Donghae, Gangwon	2008-02-05	
35		Baegyangsa Temple and Baekhakbong Peak, Jangseong	Jangseong County, South Jeolla	2008-02-05	
36		Geumsan Mountain, Namhae	Namhae County, South Gyeongsang	2008-05-02	
37		Soswaewon	Damyang County, South Jeolla	2008-05-02	
38		Suncheonman Bay	Suncheon, South Jeolla	2008-06-16	
39		Tangeumdae Height, Chungju	Chungju, North Chungcheong	2008-07-09	
40		Jeongbangpokpo Falls in Seogwipo, Jeju	Seogwipo, Jeju	2008-08-08	
41		Dodamsambong Peaks, Danyang	Danyang County, North Chungcheong	2008-09-09	
42		Seongmun Natural Arch, Danyang	Danyang County, North Chungcheong	2008-09-09	
43		Gudambong Peak, Danyang	Danyang County, North Chungcheong	2008-09-09	
44		Sainam Rock, Danyang	Danyang County, North Chungcheong	2008-09-09	
45		Oksunbong Peaks, Jecheon	Jecheon, North Chungcheong	2008-09-09	
46		Haneuljae Pass on Gyerimnyeongno Path, Chungju	Chungju, North Chungcheong	2008-12-26	
47		Cheongnyeongpo Meandering Stream, Yeongwol	Yeongwol County, Gangwon	2008-12-26	
48		Choganjeong Garden, Yecheon	Yecheon County, North Gyeongsang	2008-12-26	
49		Chaemijeong Pavilion, Gumi	Gumi, North Gyeongsang	2008-12-26	
50		Suseungdae Rock, Geochang	Geochang County, South Gyeongsang	2008-12-26	
51		Dosolgyegok Valley in Seonunsan Mountain, Gochang	Gochang County, North Jeolla	2009-09-18	
52		Ilsadae Precipice and Surroundings in Gucheondong Valley, Muju	Muju County, North Jeolla	2009-09-18	
53		Pahoe Rapids and Susimdae Precipice in Gucheondong Valley, Muju	Muju County, North Jeolla	2009-09-18	
54		Sigyeongjeong Pavilion and Surroundings, Damyang	Damyang County, South Jeolla	2009-09-18	
55		Myeongokheon Garden, Damyang	Damyang County, South Jeolla	2009-09-18	
56		Mihwangsa Temple and Surroundings in Dalmasan Mountain, Haenam	Haenam County, South Jeolla	2009-09-18	
57		Cheongamjeong Pavilion and Seokcheongyegok Valley, Bonghwa	Bonghwa County, North Gyeongsang	2009-12-09	
58		Beopjusa Temple and Surroundings in Songnisan Mountain	Boeun County, North Chungcheong	2009-12-09	
59		Haeinsa Temple and Surroundings in Gayasan Mountain	Hapcheon County, South Gyeongsang	2009-12-09	
60		Gudeurae Ferry Dock and Surroundings, Buyeo	Buyeo County, South Chungcheong	2009-12-09	
61		Hwaeomsa Temple and Surroundings in Jirisan Mountain	Gurye County, South Jeolla	2009-12-09	
62		Songgwangsa and Seonamsa Temples in Jogyesan Mountain	Suncheon, South Jeolla	2009-12-09	
63		Daeheungsa Temple and Surroundings in Duryunsan Mountain	Haenam County, South Jeolla	2009-12-09	
64		Baegaksan Mountain, Seoul	Jongno District, Seoul	2009-12-09	
65		Hajodae Rock Beach, Yangyang	Yangyang County, Gangwon	2009-12-09	
66		Halmibawi and Harabibawi Rocks at Kkotji Beach, Anmyeondo Island	Taean County, South Chungcheong	2009-12-09	
67		Goryeoseonwon Buddhist Garden of Cheongpyeongsa Temple, Chuncheon	Chuncheon, Gangwon	2010-02-05	
68		Jukbangnyeom Fishing Facility at Jijok Strait, Namhae	Namhae County, South Gyeongsang	2010-08-18	
69		Hansingyegok Valley in Jirisan Mountain	Hamyang County, South Gyeongsang	2010-08-18	
70		Geomnyongso	Taebaek, Gangwon	2010-08-18	
71		Old Path of Daegwallyeong Pass	Gangneung, Gangwon	2010-11-15	
72		Miniature Shape of the Korean Peninsula, Yeongwol	Yeongwol County, Gangwon	2011-06-10	
73		Seondol Rock Pillar, Yeongwol	Yeongwol County, Gangwon	2011-06-10	
74		Sanbangsan Mountain in Seogwipo, Jeju	Seogwipo, Jeju	2011-06-30	
75		Soesokkak River Pool in Seogwipo, Jeju	Seogwipo, Jeju	2011-06-30	
76		Oedolgae Sea Stack in Seogwipo, Jeju	Seogwipo, Jeju	2011-06-30	
77		Ullimsanbang Villa and Garden, Jindo	Jindo County, South Jeolla	2011-08-08	
78		Yonggyejeong Pavilion and Deokdongsup Grove, Pohang	Pohang, North Gyeongsang	2011-08-08	
79		Manhyujeong Garden, Andong	Andong, North Gyeongsang	2011-08-08	
80		Saraoreum Volcanic Cone	Seogwipo, Jeju	2011-10-13	
81		Yeongsilgiam Cliff and Obaengnahan Rock Pillars	Seogwipo, Jeju	2011-10-13	
82		Yongchupokpo Falls in Simjin-dong, Hamyang	Hamyang County, South Gyeongsang	2012-02-08	
83		Geoyeonjeong Pavilion and Surroundings in Hwarimdong, Hamyang	Hamyang County, South Gyeongsang	2012-02-08	
84		Woryeondae Pavilion and Surroundings, Miryang	Miryang, South Gyeongsang	2012-02-08	
85		Yongamjeong Pavilion and Surroundings, Geochang	Geochang County, South Gyeongsang	2012-04-10	
86		Imdaejeong Garden, Hwasun	Hwasun County, South Jeolla	2012-04-10	
87		Baengnokdam Crater Lake on Hallasan Mountain	Seogwipo, Jeju	2012-11-23	
88		Seonjakjiwat Plain on Hallasan Mountain	Seogwipo, Jeju	2012-12-17	
89		Bangseonmun Natural Arch, Jeju	Jeju City, Jeju	2013-01-04	
90		Hwajeogyeon Pool, Pocheon	Pocheon, Gyeonggi	2013-01-04	
91		Meonguri Gorge of Hantangang River, Pocheon	Pocheon, Gyeonggi	2013-02-06	
92		Biryongpokpo Falls and Surroundings in Seoraksan Mountain	Sokcho, Gangwon	2013-03-11	
93		Towangseongpokpo Falls in Seoraksan Mountain	Sokcho, Gangwon	2013-03-11	
94		Daeseungpokpo Falls in Seoraksan Mountain	Inje County, Gangwon	2013-03-11	
95		Sibiseonnyeotang Potholes and Surroundings in Seoraksan Mountain	Inje County, Gangwon	2013-03-11	
96		Suryeomdonggyegok and Gugokdamgyegok Valleys in Seoraksan Mountain	Inje County, Gangwon	2013-03-11	
97		Ulsanbawi Rock in Seoraksan Mountain	Gangwon	2013-03-11	
98		Biseondae Flat Rock and Cheonbuldonggyegok Valley in Seoraksan Mountain	Sokcho, Gangwon	2013-03-11	
99		Yongajangseong Ridge in Seoraksan Mountain	Inje County, Gangwon	2013-03-11	
100		Gongnyong Ridge in Seoraksan Mountain	Gangwon	2013-03-11	
101		Mangyeongdae Cliff in Seoraksan Mountain	Inje County, Gangwon	2013-03-11	
102		Jusanji Reservoir and Surroundings in Cheongsong	Cheongsong County, North Gyeongsang	2013-03-21	
103		Yongyeongyegok Valley, Gangneung	Gangneung, Gangwon	2013-03-21	
104		Hwanbyeokdang Pavilion and Surroundings, Gwangju	Buk District, Gwangju	2013-11-06	
105		Gyeongpodae Pavilion and Gyeongpoho Lagoon, Gangneung	Gangneung, Gangwon	2013-12-30	
106		Sujongsa Temple in Ungilsan Mountain, Namyangju	Namyangju, Gyeonggi	2014-03-12	
107		Hwayanggugok Valley, Goesan	Goesan County, North Chungcheong	2014-08-28	
108		Saseongam Hermitage and Surroundings, Gurye	Gurye County, South Jeolla	2014-08-28	
109		Jeokbyeok Cliff, Hwasun	Hwasun County, South Jeolla	2017-02-09	
110		Mangjubong Peak and Surroundings on Seonyudo Island, Gunsan	Gunsan, North Jeolla	2018-06-04	
111		Columnar Joints on Gyubong Peak and Jigong Stony Slope in Mudeungsan Mountain	Hwasun County, South Jeolla	2018-12-20	
112		Baegundong Garden, Gangjin	Gangjin County, South Jeolla	2019-03-11	
113		Jikso falls and surroundings, Buan	Buan County, North Jeolla	2020-04-20	
114		Seomdeungbando Peninsula in Gageodo Island, Shinan	Sinan County, South Jeolla	2020-09-02	
115		Garden in Seongbuk-dong, Seoul	Seongbuk District, Seoul	2020-09-02	
116		Bangucheon Stream and Surroundings, Ulju	Ulju County, Ulsan	2021-05-06	
117		GeumgangJukbong Columnar joints in Jijukdo Island, Goheung	Goheung County, South Jeolla	2021-06-09	
118		Naeyeon Mountain Falls in Bogyeongsa, Pohang	Pohang, North Gyeongsang	2021-12-03	
119		Byeongbawi Rock and Surroundings, Gochang	Gochang County, North Jeolla	2021-12-06	

== See also ==
- Heritage preservation in South Korea
- Places of Scenic Beauty of Japan
