= Belligobio =

Scientific classification
- Kingdom: Animalia
- Phylum: Chordata
- Class: Actinopterygii
- Order: Cypriniformes
- Family: Gobionidae
- Genus: Belligobio; D. S. Jordan & C. L. Hubbs, 1925

Type species
- Belligobio eristigma Jordan & Hubbs, 1925

Synonyms
- Hemibarboides K.-F.Wang, 1935

Genus of fishes

Belligobio is a small genus of freshwater ray-finned fish belonging to the family Gobionidae, the gudgeons. The fishes in this genus are found in China and Japan. The type species of Belligobio is Belligobio eristigma, a taxon which has been regarded as a synonym of Hemibarbus mylodon, a species not currently classified in Belligobio and some authorities suggest that Belligobio is a sub-genus within Hemibarbus. However, Eschmeyer's Catalog of Fishes, recognises B. eristigma as a separate valid species.

== Species ==
Belligobio contains the following species:

- Belligobio eristigma D. S. Jordan & C. L. Hubbs, 1925
- Belligobio nummifer (Boulenger, 1901)
- Belligobio pengxianensis P.Q. Luo, Le & Yi-Yu Chen, 1977
