= Belligobio eristigma =

Scientific classification
- Kingdom: Animalia
- Phylum: Chordata
- Class: Actinopterygii
- Order: Cypriniformes
- Family: Gobionidae
- Genus: Belligobio
- Species: B. eristigma

Binomial name
- Belligobio eristigma D. S. Jordan & C. L. Hubbs, 1925

Species of fish

Belligobio eristigma is a species of freshwater ray-finned fish belonging to the family Gobionidae, the gudgeons. This species is found in Japan. This species was first formally described in 1925 by the American ichthyologists David Starr Jordan and Carl Leavitt Hubbs with its type locality given as near Okayama in Japan. When Starr and Hubbs described this species they classified it in a new genus Belligobio, so this species is the type species of that genus. However, some authorities consider that this taxon is a synonym of Hemibarbus mylodon and that Belligobio is a subgenus of Hemibarbus, However, Eschmeyer's Catalog of Fishes, recognises B. eristigma as a separate valid species within the genus Belligobio.
