= Miniature Shape of the Korean Peninsula =

Scenic Site of South Korea

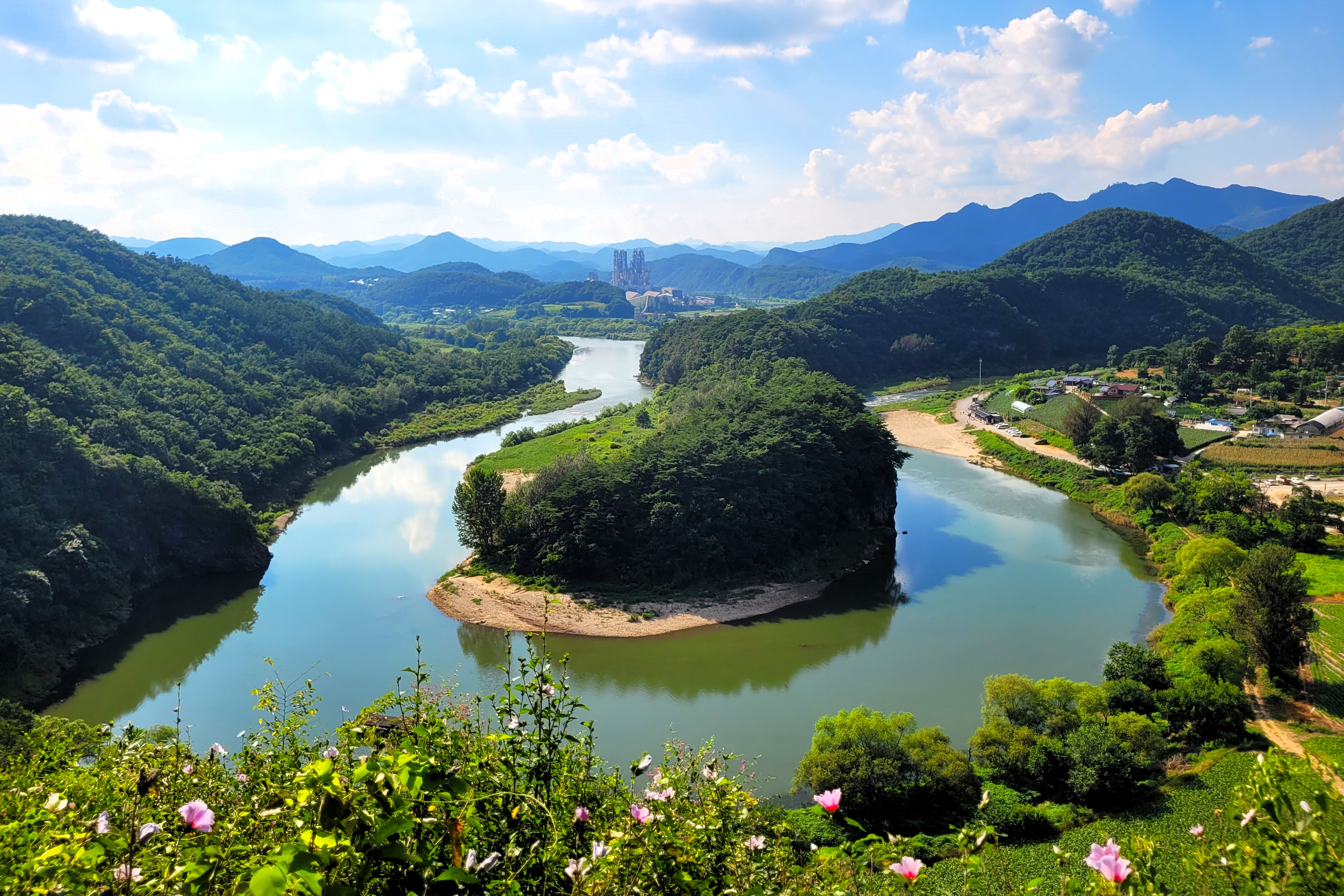
- 2023 appearance
- Interactive map of Miniature Shape of the Korean Peninsula
- 37°13′5″N 128°19′55″E
- Location: Hanbando-myeon, Yeongwol County, Gangwon Province, South Korea

Scenic Sites of South Korea
- Official name: Miniature Shape of the Korean Peninsula, Yeongwol
- Designated: 10 June 2011

The Miniature Shape of the Korean Peninsula (Korean: 영월 한반도 지형) is a landform in Yeongwol County, Gangwon Province, South Korea. It was designated as a Scenic Site in 2011. The surrounding area was registered as a Ramsar wetland in 2015 under the name Hanbando Wetland (한반도 습지).

== Description ==
Before joining the Jucheon River, the Pyeongchang River makes a wide turn, creating an erosion landform that resembles the Korean Peninsula. On the right side of the landform stands a cliff that resembles Korea's eastern coastline and on the left lies a sandy beach similar to the country's western coast. Thus, the landform is called "Korean Peninsula within the Korean Peninsula".

== History ==
The landform became a tourist attraction after it was discovered in 1999 by pastor Choi Byeong-seong and Seonam Village resident Lee Jong-man during a campaign against landfill construction. As it gained nationwide popularity, Yeongwol County changed the name of the administrative district it is in from Seo-myeon to Hanbando-myeon (Korean Peninsula Township) in 2009. Muan County, Naju, and Yecheon County also discovered and promoted similar landforms. It was designated as Scenic Site No. 75 in 2011.

Hanbando Wetland is an alluvial wetland formed at the confluence of Jucheon River and Pyeongchang River. As it has outstanding natural scenery and high biodiversity, it was designated as a wetland protection area in 2012 and a Ramsar wetland in 2015.

== Ecosystem ==
The limestone cliffs are covered with colonies of Mukdenia. The area is home to a variety of aquatic species such as Coreoleuciscus splendidus, Hemibarbus mylodon, and freshwater clams as well as birds such as egrets, common mergansers, and mandarin ducks. Eurasian otters also live in the area.

== Facilities ==
Near the observatory, there are 1,600 Hibiscus syriacus trees planted by Ko Ju-seo and other photographers since 2003.

Visitors can ride a raft at the nearby Seonam Village.

== Gallery ==
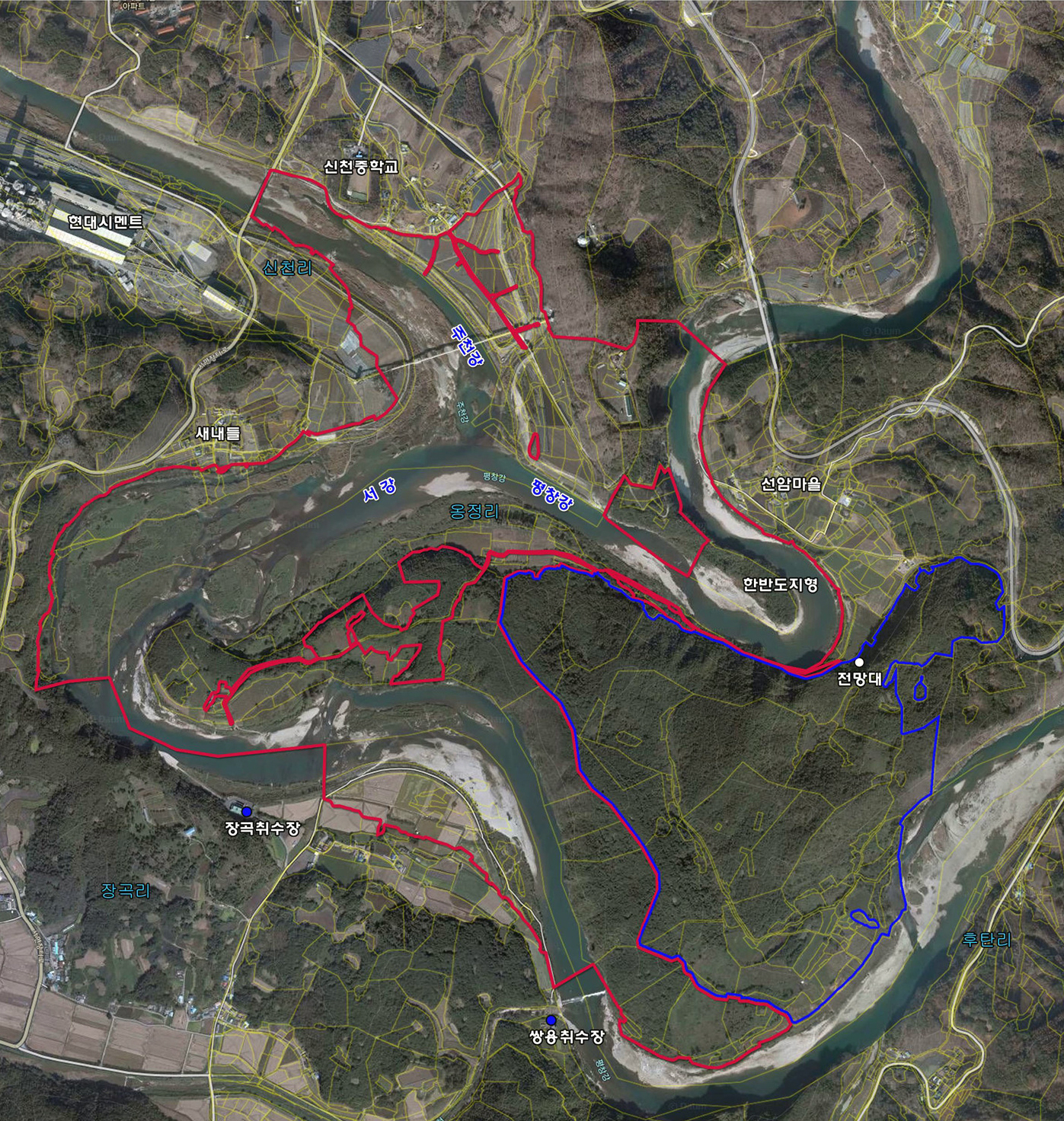
Hanbando Wetland

== External link ==
- Media related to Miniature Shape of the Korean Peninsula at Wikimedia Commons
