= Orphan Charity Foundation =

- Abbreviation: OCF
- Formation: 2007
- Type: Non-Governmental Organization
- Legal status: Registered Foundation
- Purpose: Public Utility
- Headquarters: Najaf Governorate, Iraq
- Location: Najaf Governorate
- Region served: recentlyIraq
- General Supervisor: Mohammed Hussein Al-Hakeem
- president of the Foundation: Mohammed Shafiq Al-Zain
- Head of Media Department: Mariam AL-Bahash
- Affiliations: Non-Governmental Organization
- Volunteers: 4000
- Website: http://alyatem.net/

Location of OCF in Iraq

Orphan Charity Foundation is a humanistic independent Foundation cares for orphans' affairs, in general, and orphans of terrorism, in particular. It was founded in the 4th of March 2007 on the recommendation of Ayatollah Sayyed Muhammad Sai'd Al-Hakim and under the direct supervision and support of his office. Granted with success by Allah and within extraordinary circumstances, the activities of the Foundation could cover fourteen governorates with their districts, villages, and towns. OCF aims at supporting the orphans psychologically, educationally, economically, and socially.

== Beginning of the work ==
The project started out its activities in Baghdad the capital, because it is the most targeted city of Iraqi cities, to contain the orphans of Terrorism's operations . The project fulfilled enormous achievement in extraordinary circumstances. Then, the project expanded to commence its work in Dayala and Saladin Governorate . In 2008 and after the escalated heinous attacks in the other Iraqi Governorates a strange phenomenon had been seen, which is represented by increased rates of the orphans in Dhi Qar Governorate though it is considered as secured Governorate and it is not like Babil or Basrah. After researching about the reason of that OCF found that Orphans’ fathers went to Baghdad to work as labors there and they were targeted by the terrorist attacks there . In 2008 another major department had been established in Najaf governorate to sponsor the orphans of 11 governorates: ( Najaf, Kerbala, Babil, Diwaniyah, Muthanna, Thi Qar, Wasit, Maisan, Basrah, Kirkuk, and Nineveh ). The orphan who has advantage from this project is an orphan according to Islamic Sharia, who did not reach the puberty age, but the OCF included the females till the age of completing 14 years old according to Islamic calendar to be equaled with males.

== Systemization and Management ==
According to the management and registry level, the Foundation worked hardly to be registered in Non-Governmental Organization Directorate of Council of Ministers in 2009, and accounting system was systemized in Financial Affairs Department in the way of unified accounting system, which is submitted to the specialized accountant and ratified by the Public Notary in the relating court. The Foundation has 8 departments and it involves 11 programmes for the interests of orphans. The departments are: (Statistics & registration, Financial Affairs, Administration Affairs, Media, Donation Boxes, Sponsorship, Human Development, and Studies & Planning).
