= Taejongdae =

Natural park in Busan, South Korea

Coordinates: 35°03′00″N 129°04′59″E

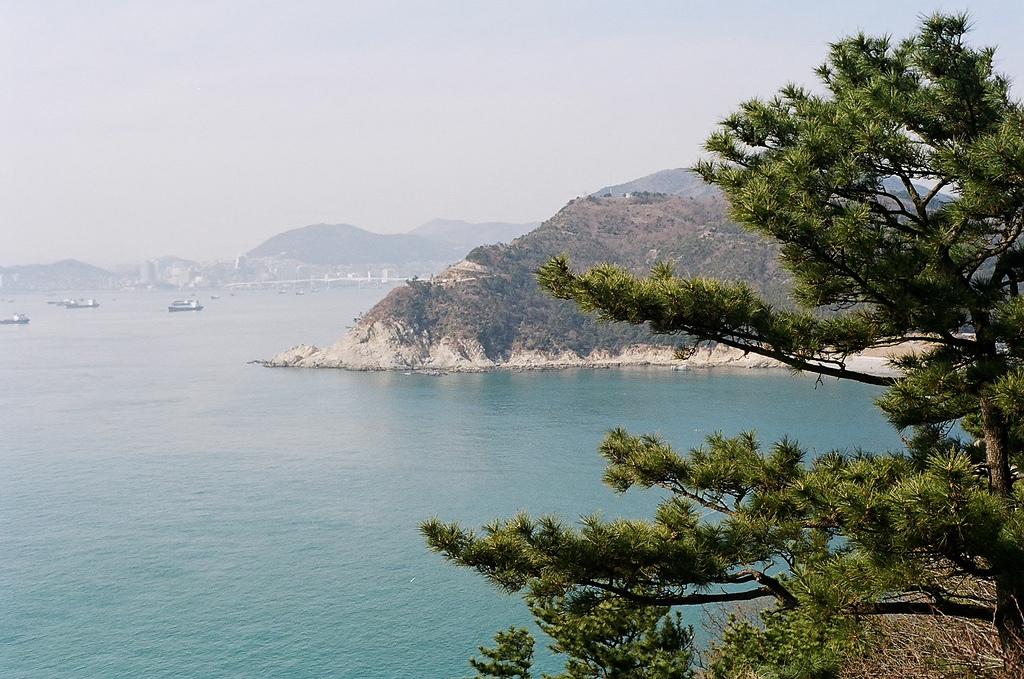
- A cliff in the park (2008)
- Designation

Scenic Sites of South Korea
- Official name: Taejongdae Cliffed Coast in Yeongdo, Busan
- Designated: 2005-11-01

Korean name
- Hangul: 태종대
- Hanja: 太宗臺
- RR: Taejongdae
- MR: T'aejongdae
- IPA: [tʰɛd͡ʑo̞ŋdɛ]

Taejongdae (Korean: 태종대) is a natural park on the southernmost point of Yeongdo District, Busan, South Korea. It is a popular tourist attraction in Busan, with dense evergreen trees and facilities for tourists such as an observatory, an amusement park, a light house, and a cruise ship terminal. It is said that its name to have taken from King Taejong Muyeol (604–661), the 29th king of the Silla Kingdom who liked to practice archery there after the unification of the Three Kingdoms of Korea. Taejongdae is designated as the 28 Busan monument, along with Oryukdo Island.

== Gallery ==
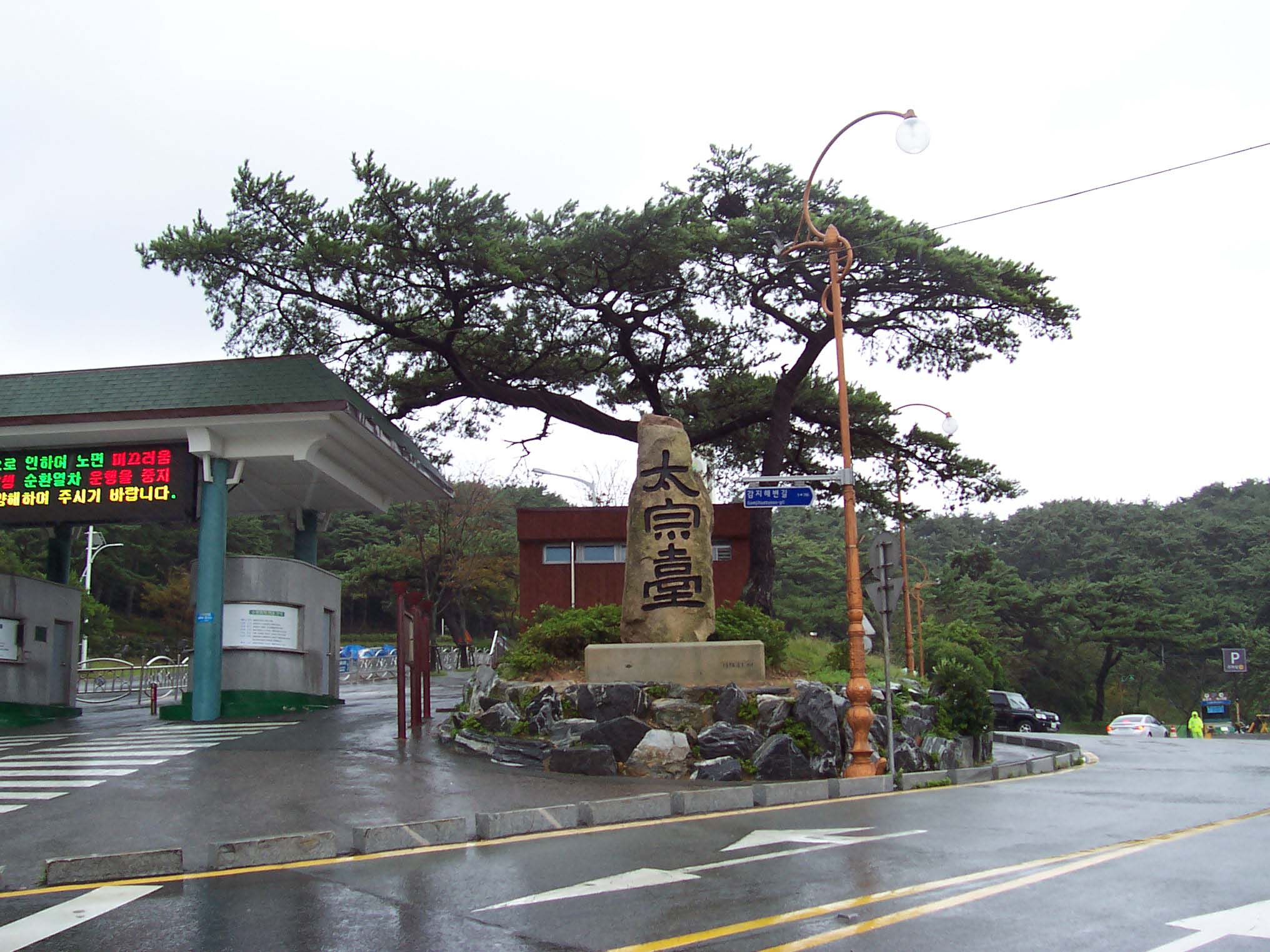
Entrance

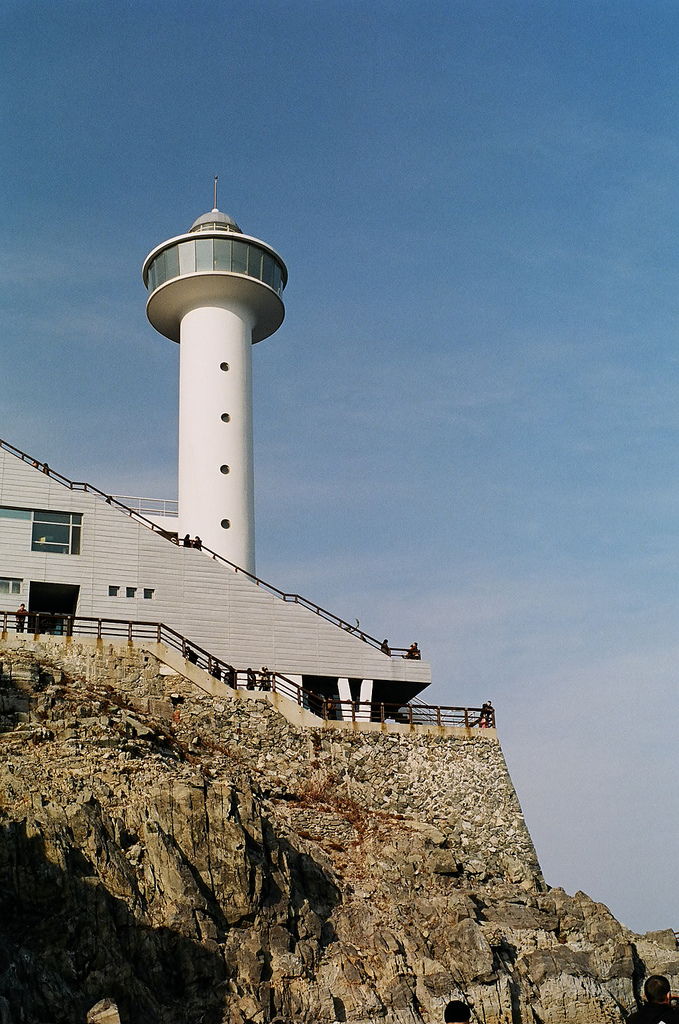
Lighthouse on the cliff

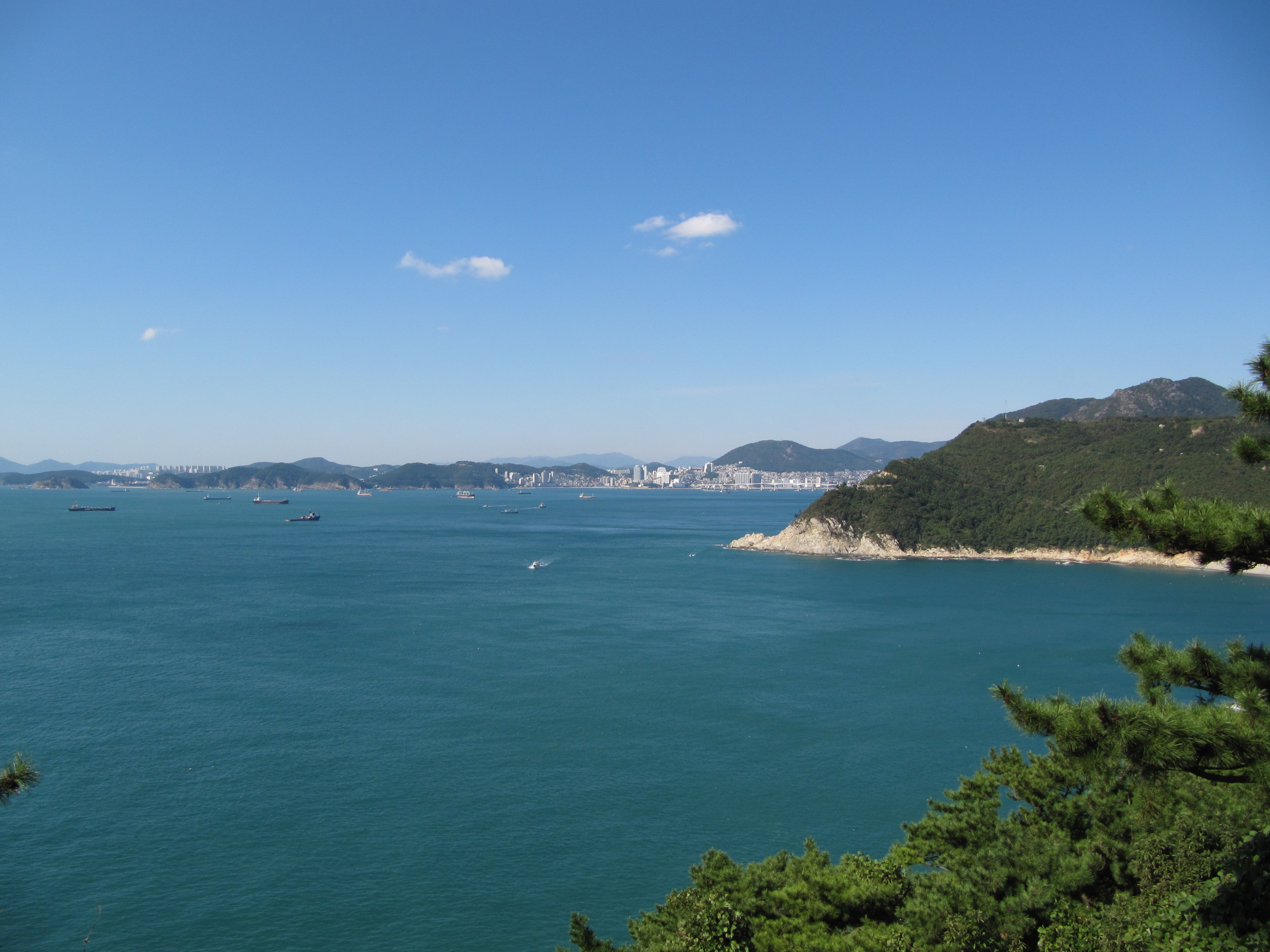

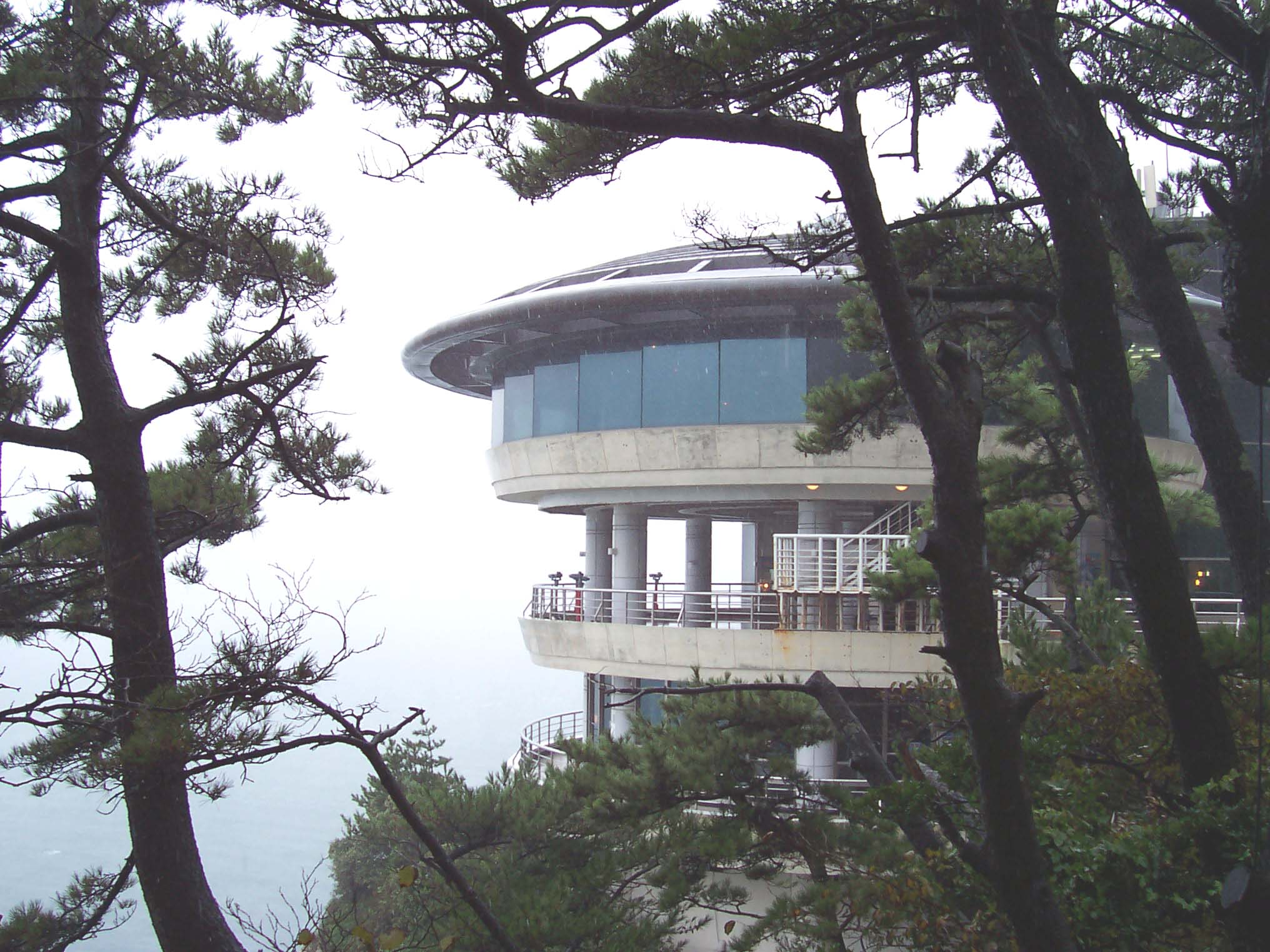

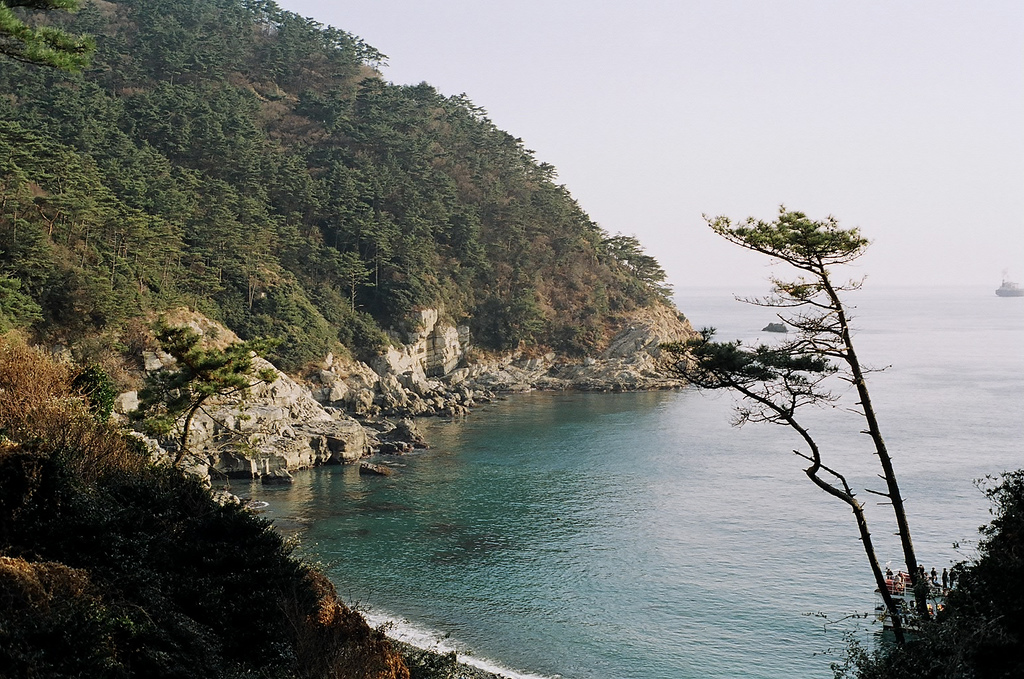

== See also ==
- Haeundae
- Gwangalli Beach
