= Belligobio pengxianensis =

Conservation status
- Least Concern (IUCN 3.1)

Scientific classification
- Kingdom: Animalia
- Phylum: Chordata
- Class: Actinopterygii
- Order: Cypriniformes
- Family: Gobionidae
- Genus: Belligobio
- Species: B. pengxianensis

Binomial name
- Belligobio pengxianensis Y.-L. Lu, P.-Q. Luo and Y.-Y. Che, 1977

Species of fish

Belligobio pengxianensis is a species of freshwater ray-finned fish belonging to the family Gobionidae, the gudgeons, endemic to China. It is found in the Amur River.
