= Sambangsan =

Mountain in Gyeonggi Province, South Korea

Highest point
- Elevation: 980 m (3,220 ft)

Geography
- Location: South Korea

Korean name
- Hangul: 삼방산
- Hanja: 三芳山
- RR: Sambangsan
- MR: Sambangsan

Sambangsan (Korean: 삼방산) is a mountain in the counties of Pyeongchang and Yeongwol, Gangwon Province, South Korea. It has an elevation of 980 m (3,215 ft).

== Geology ==
The Sambangsan Formations has diverse homogeneous, purple, to greenish gray fine sandstone and siltstone. Sandstones are generally massive, greenish gray, and fine grained, showing small-scale bands and are poorly to moderately sorted (Chough 90). They are mainly composed of fine to very fine quartz, feldspar, mica, and opaque minerals, and show foliations. Quartz are mainly made out of 70 – 80% of framework grains and the upper parts of the formation are formed by fauna of the middle Middle Cambrian. The occurrence of fine sandstone layers is suggestive of deposition in relatively shallow to deep-water environments (Chough 93). Sambangsan Formation consists of a lot of light grey, green or brown, massive or thick-bedded sandstone (upper part) and red or green shale and sandy shale. Extreme tribes of Middle Cambrian age occur in light brown, thin-bedded medium to coarse-grained, micaceous sandstone beds in the upper part of the formations (Chough 22).

== See also ==
- List of mountains in Korea
