= Cheongnyangsan =

Mountain in South Korea

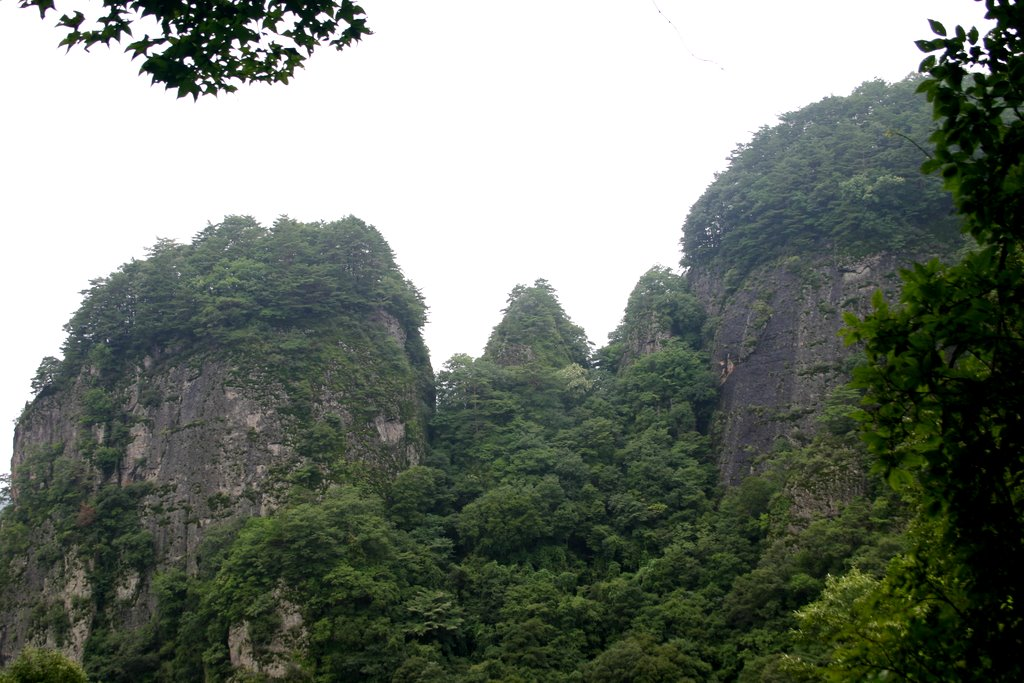

Highest point
- Elevation: 870 m (2,850 ft)
- Listing: Mountains of Korea
- Coordinates: 36°47′29″N 128°55′37″E

Geography
- Country: South Korea
- Province: North Gyeongsang

Scenic Sites of South Korea
- Official name: Cheongnyangsan Mountain, Bonghwa
- Designated: 2007-03-13

Cheongnyangsan (Korean: 청량산) is a mountain of North Gyeongsang Province, eastern South Korea. It has an elevation of 870 metres.
