= Gombong (mountain) =

Mountain in Yeongwol, South Korea

Highest point
- Elevation: 930.3 m (3,052 ft)

Geography
- Location: South Korea

Korean name
- Hangul: 곰봉
- Hanja: 곰峰
- RR: Gombong
- MR: Kombong

Gombong (Korean: 곰봉) is a mountain in Yeongwol County, Gangwon Province, South Korea. It has an elevation of 930.3 m (3,052 ft).

== See also ==
- List of mountains in Korea
