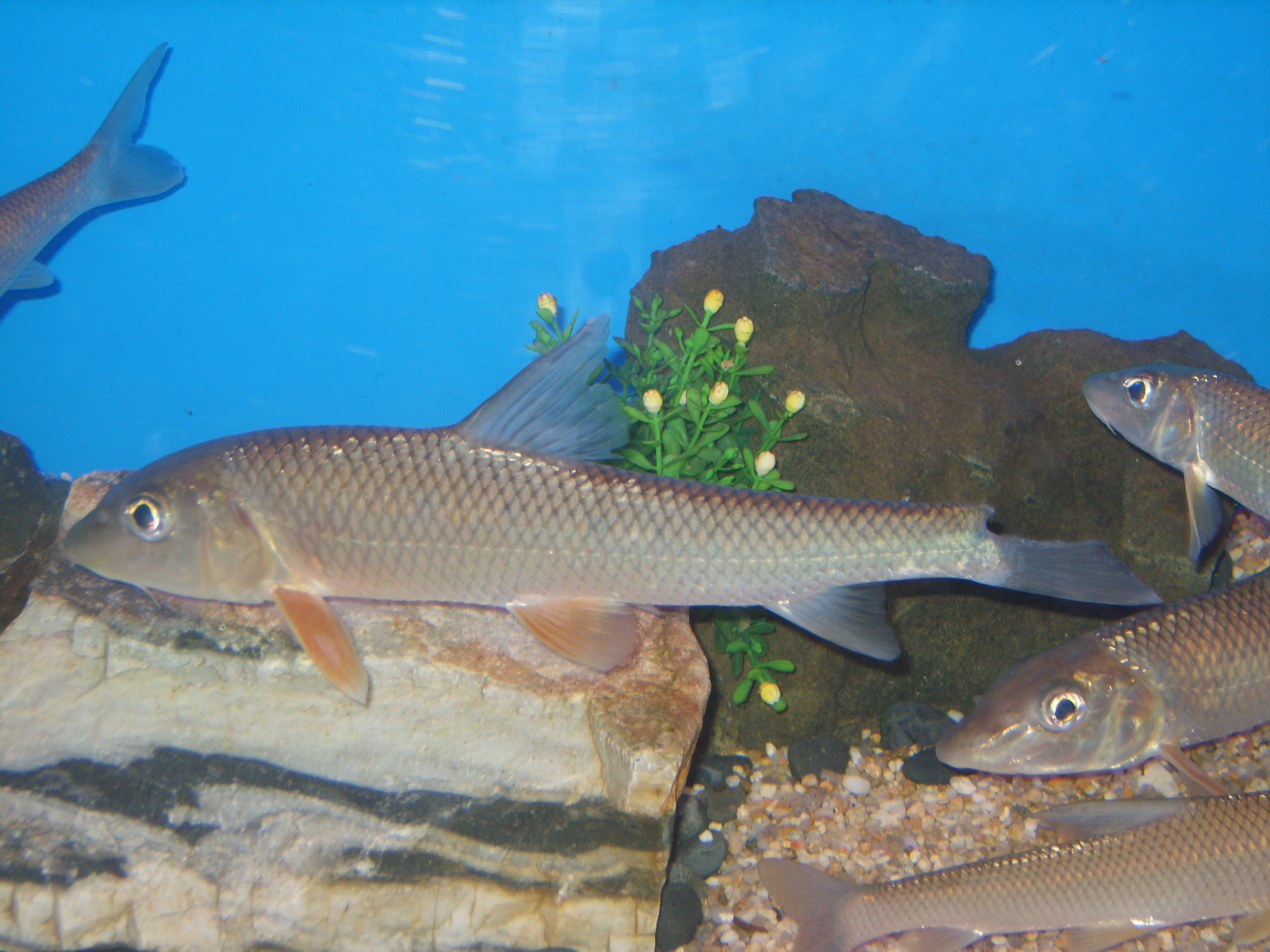

Conservation status
- Least Concern (IUCN 3.1)

Scientific classification
- Kingdom: Animalia
- Phylum: Chordata
- Class: Actinopterygii
- Order: Cypriniformes
- Suborder: Cyprinoidei
- Family: Gobionidae
- Genus: Hemibarbus
- Species: H. labeo

Binomial name
- Hemibarbus labeo (Pallas, 1776)

Synonyms
- Cyprinus labeo Pallas, 1776; Gobio barbus Temminck & Schlegel, 1846; Hemibarbus barbus (Temminck & Schlegel, 1846); Barbus schlegelii Günther, 1868; Pseudogobio chaoi Evermann & T.-S. Shaw, 1927; Hemibarbus longianalis Kimura 1934; Acanthogobio oxyrhynchus Nikolskii, 1904

= Barbel steed =

Species of fish

The barbel steed (Hemibarbus labeo) is a species of small freshwater ray-finned fish belonging to the family Gobionidae, the gudgeons. It is found throughout the Amur basin in eastern Asia to northern Vietnam, Japan and islands of Hainan and Taiwan.
