= Belligobio nummifer =

Conservation status
- Least Concern (IUCN 3.1)

Scientific classification
- Kingdom: Animalia
- Phylum: Chordata
- Class: Actinopterygii
- Order: Cypriniformes
- Family: Gobionidae
- Genus: Belligobio
- Species: B. nummifer

Binomial name
- Belligobio nummifer (Boulenger, 1901)

Synonyms
- Gonio nummifer Boulenger, 1901; Hemibarboides tientaiensis K.-F. Wang, 1935

Species of fish

Belligobio nummifer is a species of freshwater ray-finned fish belonging to the family Gobionidae, the gudgeons. This species is endemic to China where it is found in the Yangtze, Lingjiang, and Fuchunjiang Rivers.
