= Gogosan =

Mountain in Gagwon province, South Korea

Highest point
- Elevation: 853.6 m (2,801 ft)

Geography
- Location: South Korea

Korean name
- Hangul: 고고산
- Hanja: 高古山
- RR: Gogosan
- MR: Kogosan

Gogosan (Korean: 고고산) is a mountain in Gangwon Province, South Korea. Its area extends across the counties of Yeongwol and Jeongseon. Gogosan has an elevation of 853.6 m (2,801 ft).

== See also ==
- List of mountains in Korea
