= Hemibarbus macracanthus =

Conservation status
- Data Deficient (IUCN 3.1)

Scientific classification
- Kingdom: Animalia
- Phylum: Chordata
- Class: Actinopterygii
- Order: Cypriniformes
- Suborder: Cyprinoidei
- Family: Gobionidae
- Genus: Hemibarbus
- Species: H. macracanthus

Binomial name
- Hemibarbus macracanthus Y. L. Lu, P. Q. Luo & Yi-Yu Chen, 1977

Species of fish

Hemibarbus macracanthus is a species of small freshwater ray-finned fish belonging to the family Gobionidae, the gudgeons. It is endemic to China.
