= Wantaeksan =

Mountain in South Korea

Highest point
- Elevation: 916.1 m (3,006 ft)

Geography
- Location: South Korea

Korean name
- Hangul: 완택산
- Hanja: 完澤山
- RR: Wantaeksan
- MR: Want'aeksan

Wantaeksan (Korean: 완택산) is a mountain in Yeongwol County, Gangwon Province, South Korea. It has an elevation of 916.1 m (3,006 ft).

== See also ==
- List of mountains in Korea
