= Hemibarbus brevipennus =

Conservation status
- Least Concern (IUCN 3.1)

Scientific classification
- Kingdom: Animalia
- Phylum: Chordata
- Class: Actinopterygii
- Order: Cypriniformes
- Suborder: Cyprinoidei
- Family: Gobionidae
- Genus: Hemibarbus
- Species: H. brevipennus

Binomial name
- Hemibarbus brevipennus P. Q. Yue, 1995

Species of fish

Hemibarbus brevipennus is a species of small freshwater ray-finned fish belonging to the family Gobionidae, the gudgeons. It is endemic to Lingjiang and Oujiang rivers in China.
