= Geumdaebong =

Mountain in South Korea

Highest point
- Elevation: 1,408.1 m (4,620 ft)

Geography
- Location: South Korea

Korean name
- Hangul: 금대봉
- Hanja: 金臺峰
- RR: Geumdaebong
- MR: Kŭmdaebong

Geumdaebong (Korean: 금대봉) is a mountain in Gangwon Province, South Korea. Its area extends over the cities of Taebaek, Samcheok and Jeongseon County. Geumdaebong has an elevation of 1,408.1 m (4,620 ft). The mountain has Maebongsan to the East, Hambaeksan to the South, and Daedeoksan to the North.

== See also ==
- List of mountains in Korea
