= Geomnyongso =

Natural spring in South Korea

- 검룡소
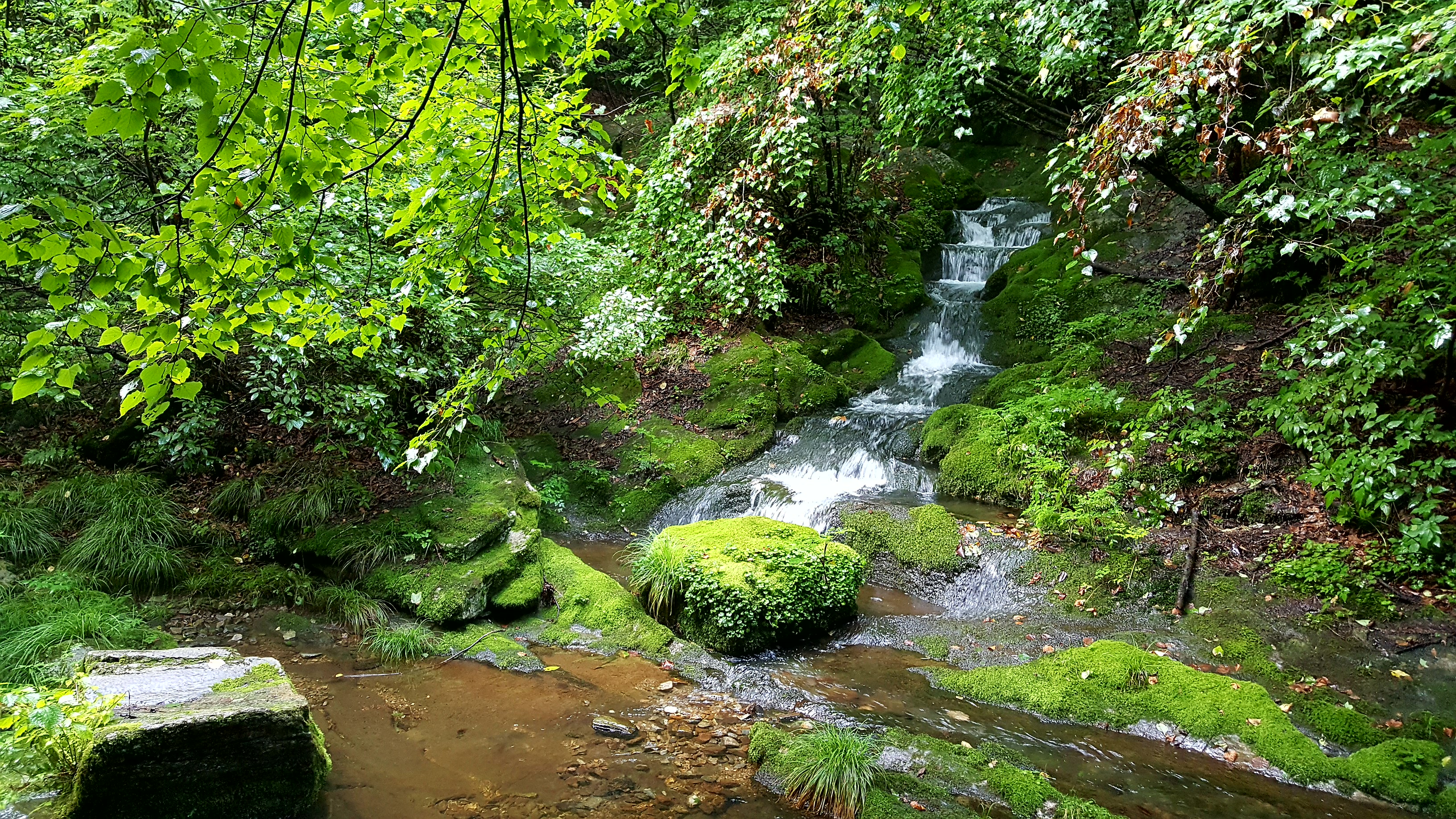
- Geomnyongso is the source of the Han River

- Location within South Korea
- Location: Taebaek, Gangwon Province, South Korea
- Coordinates: 37°13′39″N 128°55′07″E
- Area: 91,745 km^{2} (35,423 sq mi)
- Governing body: Cultural Heritage Administration

- Geomnyongso
- Hangul: 검룡소
- Hanja: 儉龍沼
- RR: Geomnyongso
- MR: Kŏmnyongso

Geomnyongso (Korean: 검룡소; Hanja: 儉龍沼) is a natural spring in South Korea, and is considered to be the source of the Han River, the river that travels through the capital city of Seoul. This spring was designated in 2010 as a national "scenic spot".

== History ==
As the spring was approved to become a national tourist destination, the local government began creating plans in order to preserve the natural environment of the spring as tourist levels increase.

== Geography ==
The spring is located at the foothills of Geumdaebong. The total area of the natural area is about 91,745 km^{2} (35,423 sq mi).

== See also ==
- Namhan River
- Source of the Danube
