= Duwibong =

Mountain in Gangwon Province, South Korea

Highest point
- Elevation: 1,465.9 m (4,809 ft)

Geography
- Location: South Korea

Korean name
- Hangul: 두위봉
- Hanja: 斗圍峰
- RR: Duwibong
- MR: Tuwibong

Duwibong (Korean: 두위봉) is a mountain in the counties of Jeongseon and Yeongwol, Gangwon Province, South Korea. It has an elevation of 1,465.9 m (4,809 ft).

== See also ==
- List of mountains in Korea
