= Gyeongpo Lake =

Lagoon in Gangneung, South Korea

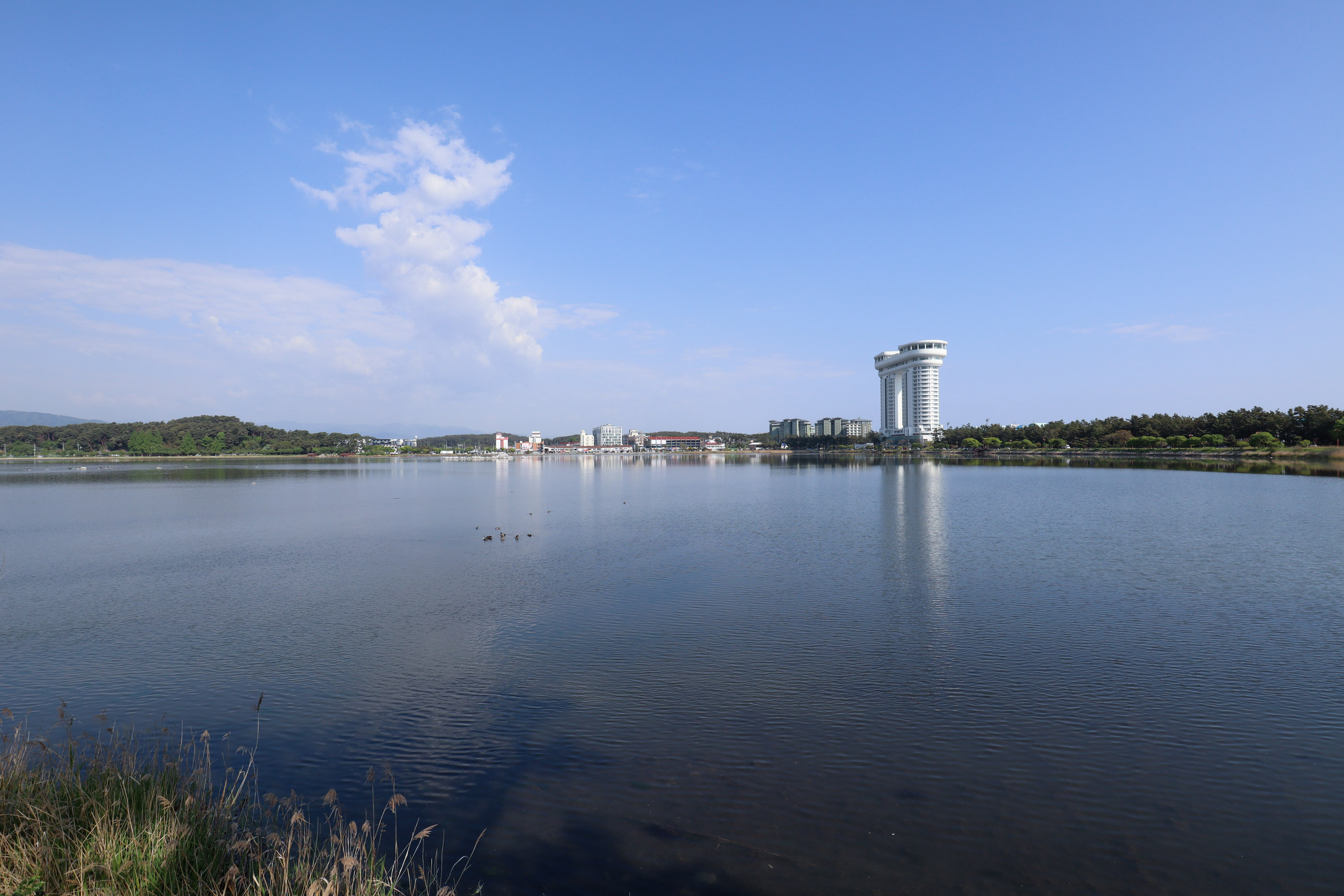
- Gyeongpo Lake in 2022
- Interactive map of Gyeongpo Lake
- 37°47′50″N 128°54′10″E
- Location: Gangneung, Gangwon Province, South Korea

Scenic Sites of South Korea
- Official name: Gyeongpodae Pavilion and Gyeongpoho Lagoon, Gangneung
- Designated: 2013-12-30

Gyeongpo Lake (Korean: 경포호) is a lagoon in Gangneung, Gangwon Province, South Korea. It was designated as Scenic Site in 2013 with Gyeongpodae.

== Description ==
Gyeongpo Lake means "lagoon as clear as a mirror". It is the second biggest lagoon in the east coast. As it has excellent scenery, 13 pavilions such as treasures Gyeongpodae and Haeunjeong are distributed around the lake.

== History ==
Gyeongpo Lake was a bay 6,000 years ago but became a lagoon.

The area of the lake was continuously reduced due to soil influx from nearby river valley and artificial landfilling. It was 1.74 km^{2} in the 1910s but became 0.90 km^{2} in the 2000s.

In 1982, Gyeongpo Lake with Sageunjin Beach, Gyeongpo Beach, Gangmun Beach and Songjeong Beach were designated as Gyeongpo Provincial Park but in 2016, most of the beaches were excluded from the designation.

== Ecosystem ==
Ducks, cormorants and egrets inhabit the lake and migratory birds such as swans, mallards and white-naped cranes have been spotted.

According to 2004 research, the number of freshwater fish in Gyeongpo Lake sharply declined. The main cause is increased salinity due to consistent seawater inflow but reduced inflow from nearby streams.
