= Ungyosan =

Mountain in South Korea

Highest point
- Elevation: 925 m (3,035 ft)

Geography
- Location: South Korea

Korean name
- Hangul: 운교산
- Hanja: 雲橋山
- RR: Ungyosan
- MR: Un'gyosan

Ungyosan (Korean: 운교산) is a mountain in Yeongwol County, Gangwon Province, South Korea. It has an elevation of 925 m (3,035 ft).

== See also ==
- List of mountains in Korea
