= Hemibarbus medius =

Scientific classification
- Kingdom: Animalia
- Phylum: Chordata
- Class: Actinopterygii
- Order: Cypriniformes
- Suborder: Cyprinoidei
- Family: Gobionidae
- Genus: Hemibarbus
- Species: H. medius

Binomial name
- Hemibarbus medius P. Q. Yue, 1995

Species of fish

Hemibarbus medius is a species of small freshwater ray-finned fish belonging to the family Gobionidae, the gudgeons. It is endemic to southern China.
