= Gubongdaesan =

Mountain in South Korea

Highest point
- Elevation: 900.7 m (2,955 ft)

Geography
- Location: South Korea

Korean name
- Hangul: 구봉대산
- Hanja: 九峰臺山
- RR: Gubongdaesan
- MR: Kubongdaesan

Gubongdaesan (Korean: 구봉대산) is a mountain in Yeongwol County, Gangwon Province, South Korea. It has an elevation of 900.7 m (2,955 ft).

== See also ==
- List of mountains in Korea
