= Hemibarbus umbrifer =

Conservation status
- Least Concern (IUCN 3.1)

Scientific classification
- Kingdom: Animalia
- Phylum: Chordata
- Class: Actinopterygii
- Order: Cypriniformes
- Suborder: Cyprinoidei
- Family: Gobionidae
- Genus: Hemibarbus
- Species: H. umbrifer

Binomial name
- Hemibarbus umbrifer (S.-Y. Lin, 1931)

Synonyms
- Paracanthobrama umbrifer; Paraleucogobio umbrifer

Species of fish

Hemibarbus umbrifer is a species of small freshwater ray-finned fish belonging to the family Gobionidae, the gudgeons. It is endemic to the Xi River in China.
