= Oedolgae =

Rock formation in Seogwipo, South Korea

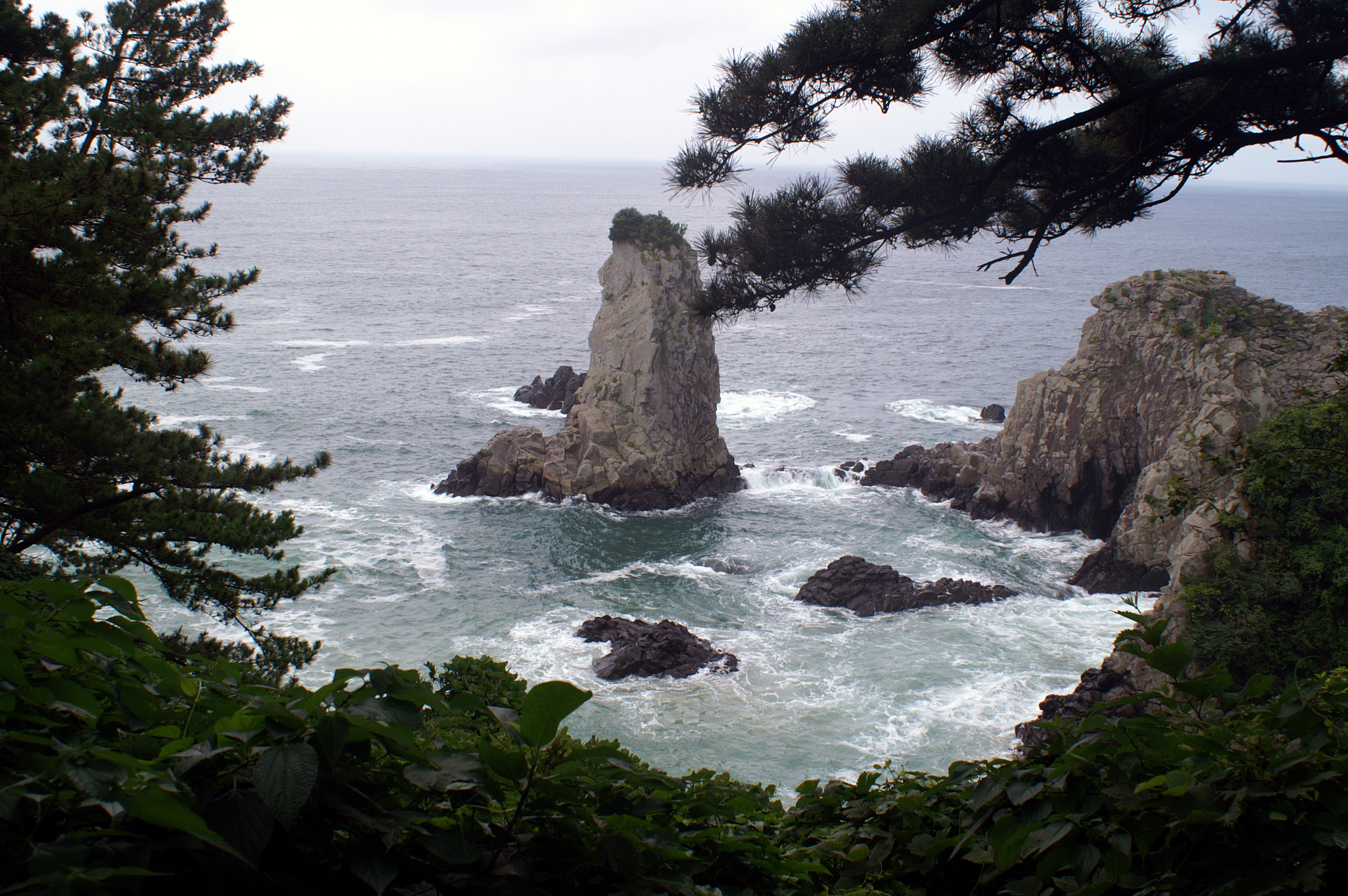
- Oedolgae (center; 2009)

Location
- Location: Seoheung-dong, Seogwipo, Jeju Province, South Korea
- Coordinates: 33.239212°N 126.544859°E

Scenic Sites of South Korea
- Official name: Oedolgae Sea Stack in Seogwipo, Jeju
- Designated: 2011-06-30

Korean name
- Hangul: 외돌개
- RR: Oedolgae
- MR: Oedolgae

Oedolgae (Korean: 외돌개) is a pillar rock formation located in Seoheung-dong, Seogwipo, Jeju Province, South Korea. It is a popular tourist attraction and considered scenic. It was designated a Scenic Site of South Korea on June 30, 2011.
