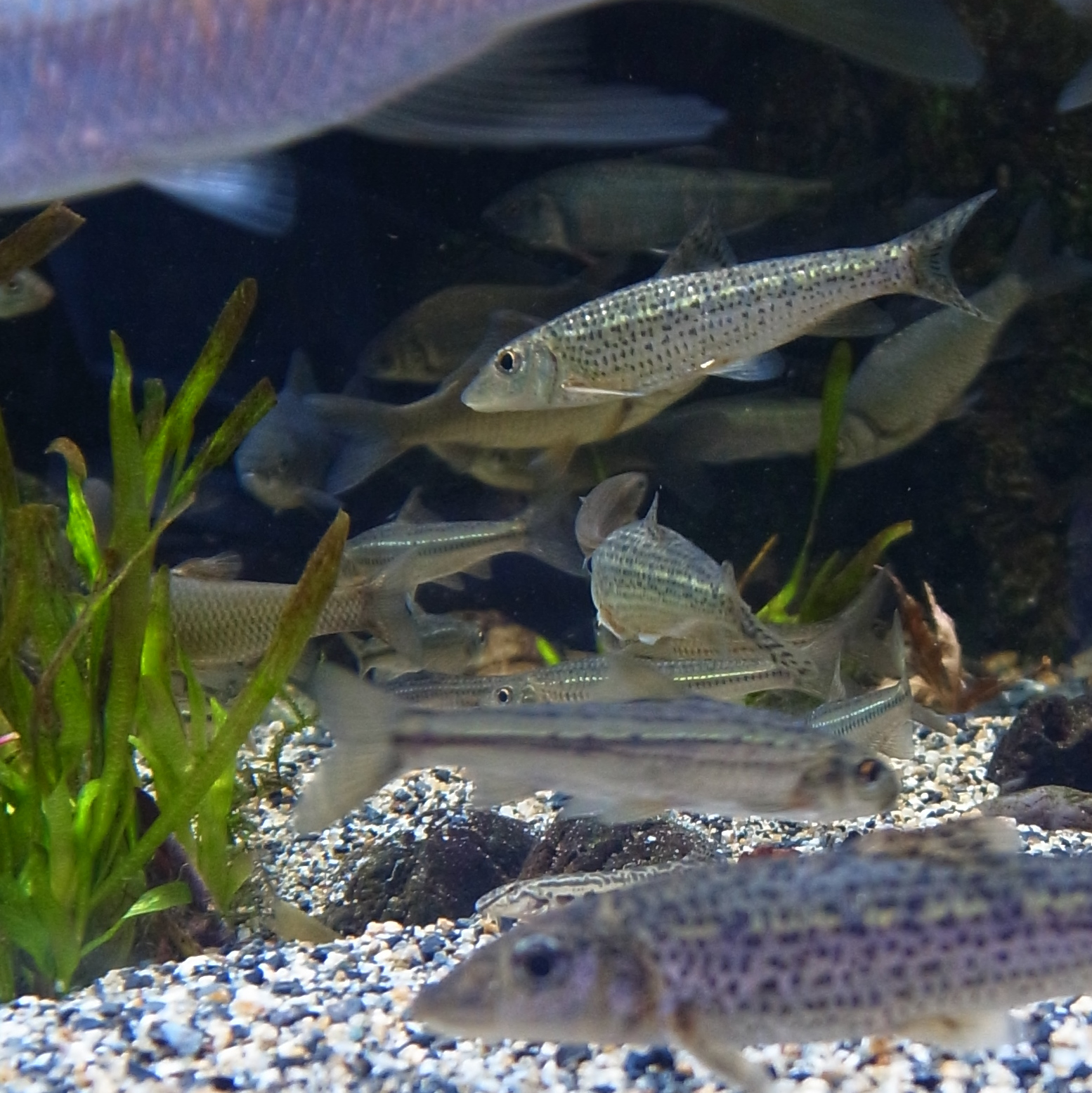

Conservation status
- Least Concern (IUCN 3.1)

Scientific classification
- Kingdom: Animalia
- Phylum: Chordata
- Class: Actinopterygii
- Order: Cypriniformes
- Suborder: Cyprinoidei
- Family: Gobionidae
- Genus: Hemibarbus
- Species: H. longirostris

Binomial name
- Hemibarbus longirostris (Regan, 1908)

Synonyms
- Acanthogobio longirostris Regan, 1908; Hemibarbus shingtsonensis T.-S. Shaw, 1930; Paraleucogobio cheni H.-W. Wu, 1931

= Hemibarbus longirostris =

Species of fish

Hemibarbus longirostris is a species of small freshwater ray-finned fish belonging to the family Gobionidae, the gudgeons. It is found in Japan, the Korean Peninsula and China.
