= Jungnyeong =

Mountain pass in South Korea

Coordinates: 36°54′08″N 128°26′07″E

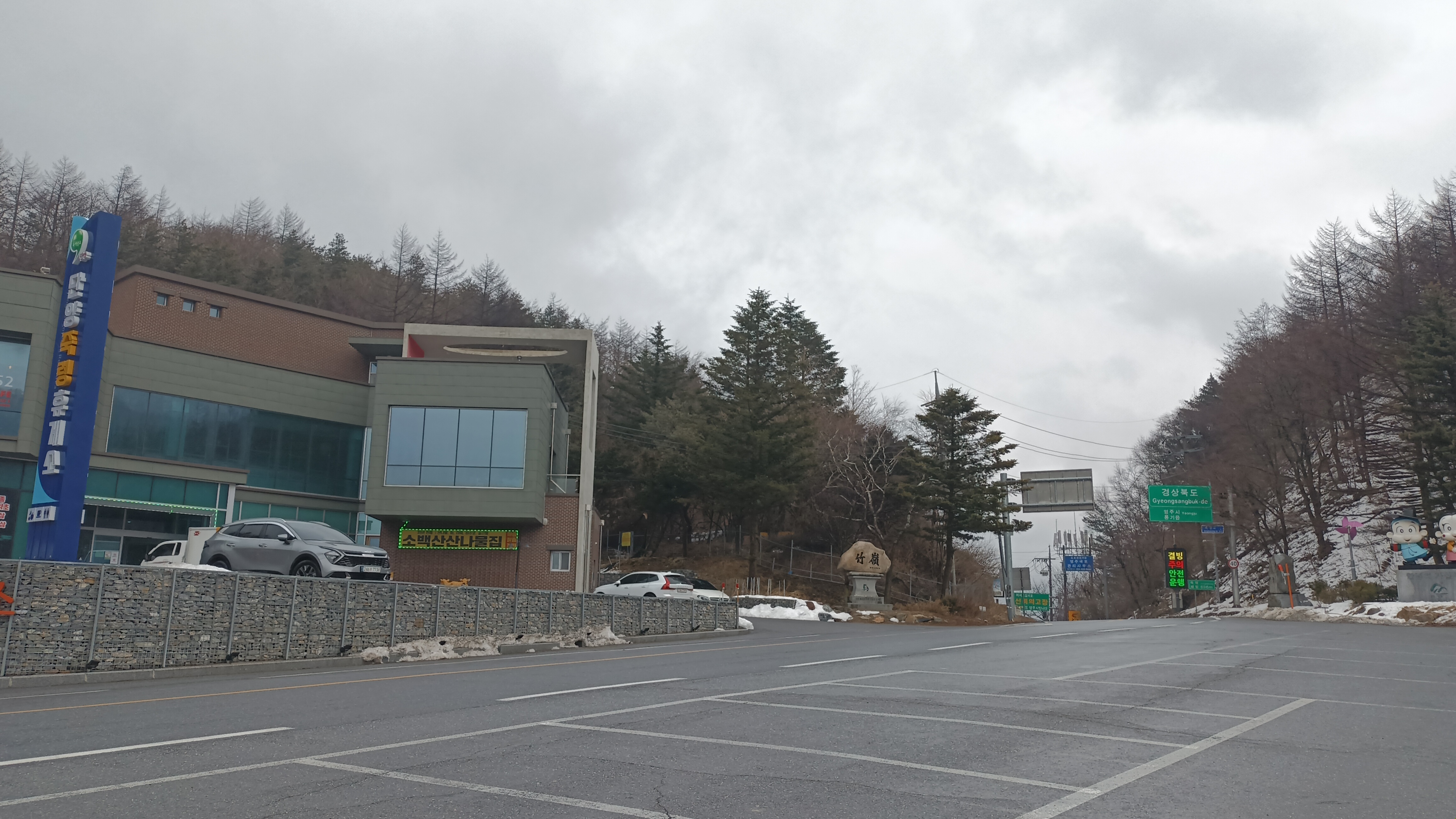
- Interactive map of Jungnyeong

Scenic Sites of South Korea
- Official name: Old Path of Jungnyeong Pass
- Designated: 2007-12-17

Korean name
- Hangul: 죽령
- Hanja: 竹嶺
- RR: Jungnyeong
- MR: Chungnyŏng

Alternate name
- Hangul: 대재
- RR: Daejae
- MR: Taejae

Jungnyeong (Korean: 죽령) is a mountain pass in the Sobaek Mountains of central South Korea. It reaches a height of 689 metres (2,260 ft). It stands on the flank of Sobaeksan, which reaches more than twice that height.

The pass connects Punggi-eup, Yeongju, North Gyeongsang Province with Danyang County in North Chungcheong Province. Although today it is little more than a tourist attraction, in past ages it played a key role in connecting the eastern and western regions of the Korean Peninsula. Today the Jungang Line railroad passes underneath Jungnyeong; the tunnel is 4.5 kilometres long.

It was also of great religious significance. During the early Silla period, the kings held spring and autumn rites here in honor of the mountain gods. These practices continued into the Joseon Dynasty (1392-1910), when a temple to the mountain god was built here, known as "Jungnyeongsa." In addition, the area was used as a location for Buddhist worship; as Buddhism took root in Silla in the seventh century, the temples of Buseoksa, Choamsa and Huibangsa were built.

Jungnyeong is also sometimes called by the pure Korean name daejae (대재). Both names mean "Bamboo Pass."

== See also ==
- Geography of South Korea
- Mountains of Korea
- Korean Shamanism
- Baekdu-daegan
