= Gudambong =

Mountain in South Korea

Highest point
- Elevation: 330 m (1,080 ft)

Geography
- Location: North Chungcheong Province, South Korea

Gudambong is a mountain of North Chungcheong Province, South Korea. It has an elevation of 330 metres.

== See also ==
- List of mountains of Korea
