= Saseongam =

Buddhist hermitage in South Korea

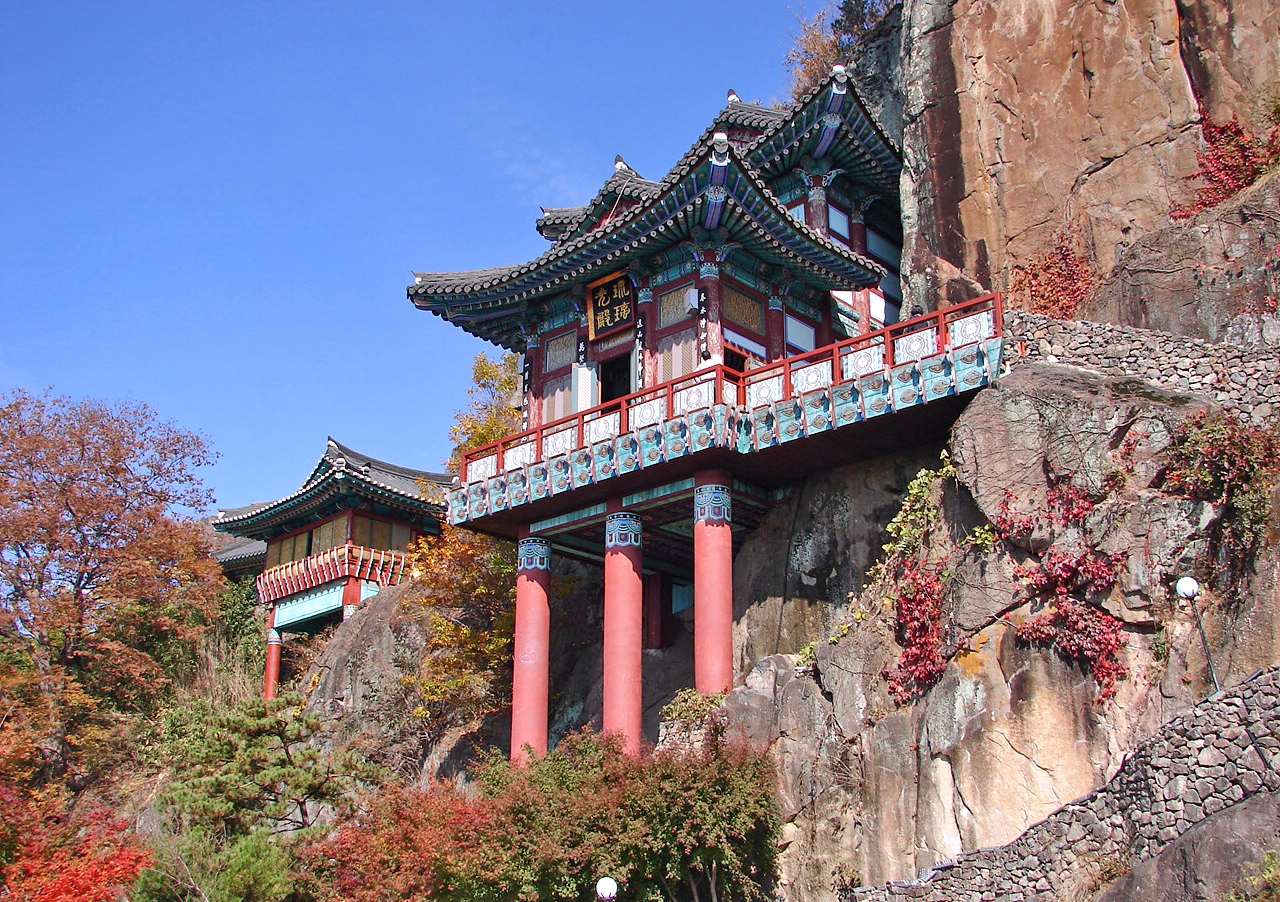
- Main Hall - Saseongam (hermitage)

- Location within South Korea

Religion
- Affiliation: Buddhism

Location
- Country: South Korea
- Coordinates: 35.179684°N 127.480772°E

Architecture
- Completed: 544

Korean name
- Hangul: 사성암
- RR: Saseongam
- MR: Sasŏngam

Saseongam (Korean: 사성암) is a Buddhist hermitage located in Gurye County on Mount Osan, a foothill of the mountain Jirisan in South Jeolla Province, South Korea.

== Origin ==
Saseongam is said to have been built in 544, the 22nd year of the reign of King Seong of Baekche, by Priest Yeongi Josa (연기조사), but there are no records to substantiate it. Yeongi Josa is also credited with establishing the nearby Hwaseomsa and Yeongoksa.

== History ==
Initially the hermitage was called Osanam, being positioned near the 531 meter/1,742 foot summit of mount Osan, before it was renamed Saseongam, or the Hermitage of Four Saints, in honor of the four high priests Yongi Chosa, Wonhyo Daesa, Toseon Kuksa, and Chinkak Seonsa, that lived, worked, and studied here.

Records do indicate that both Great Master Wonhyo Daesa and National Master Doseon Guksa practiced the Dharma in retreat on these cliffs when they visited this area.

Hermitage buildings were reconstructed under supervision of National Meditation-Master Jingak Seonsa (1178–1234). The Main Hall was reconstructed in the 1980s.

It is believed that the high priests practiced asceticism (the doctrine that through renunciation of worldly pleasures it is possible to achieve a high spiritual or intellectual state by rigorous self-denial and active self-restraint) here for an interval from the closing period of Unified Silla era through the Goryeo Kingdom era.

== Features ==
Two halls, at the front of the hermitage are supported by large painted pillars, are set against the steep granite cliff, and two other halls rest atop a crest to the west of the main hall. Around Mount Osan are found many peculiarly shaped rocks, one of which has an engraving of a standing Buddha.

=== Main hall ===
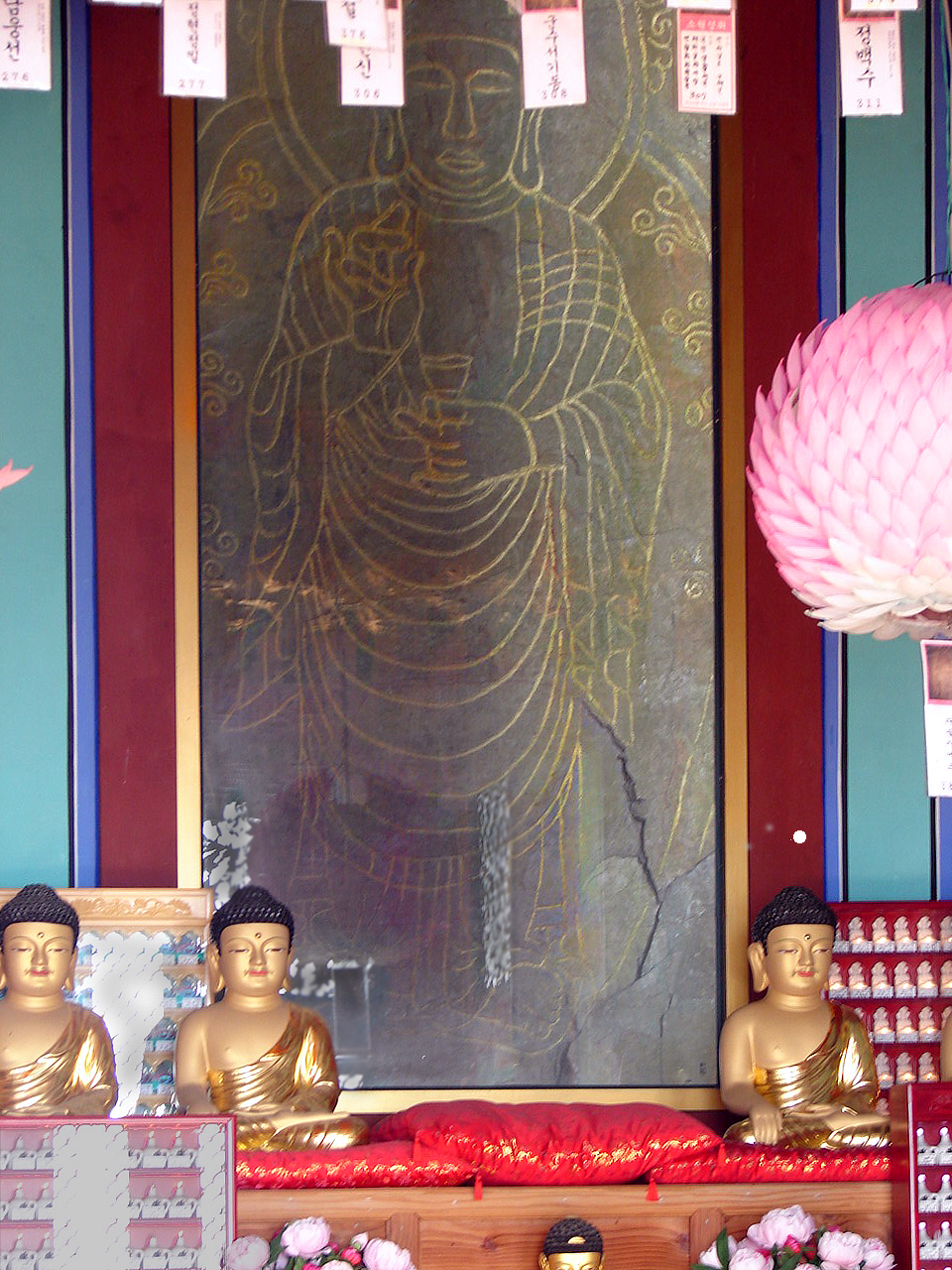
Maaeyeoraeipsang carved into the rock face is visible through a large glass window on back wall of the main hall

The Main Hall sits atop three massive red wood pillars positioned in front a standing Buddha cut into rock face, called Maaeyeoraeipsang (마애여래입상). The Buddha carved into the rock face is visible through a large glass window that makes up most of the back wall of the main hall.

Cultural authorities estimate that Maaeyeoraeipsang dates back to the early Goryeo Dynasty. A steep stone stairway leads up to a bridge that crosses over to the main hall.

=== Jijangjeon ===
Jijangjeon (hall) is found up a second set of stone stairways to the west of the main hall behind a lesser hall perched atop two large red wood pillars. Jijangjeon is a tribute building for the Bodhisattva Jijang, or Ksitigarbha, the Bodhisattva who cures suffering. Jijang goes to the various levels of hell and pleads with the souls of men to repent.

=== Sanshingak ===
Sanshingak (Mountain-spirit Shrine) is a small hall dedicated to Sanshin behind Jijangjeon. Sanshin are the local gods of mountains typically represented as an elder male figure surrounded by tigers.

=== Doseongul ===
Doseongul (cave) is really just a passageway between gigantic cliff-boulders next to Sanshingak. It is said that Great Monk Wonhyo Daesa spent some time meditating in here, and that 200 years later National Master Doseon Guksa lived here for a short time while working on the theory of Korea's adaptation of Feng shui, Pungsu-jiri-seol.

== Cultural Property Material ==
Saseongam is Jeollanamdo Cultural Property Material #33.

== Gallery ==
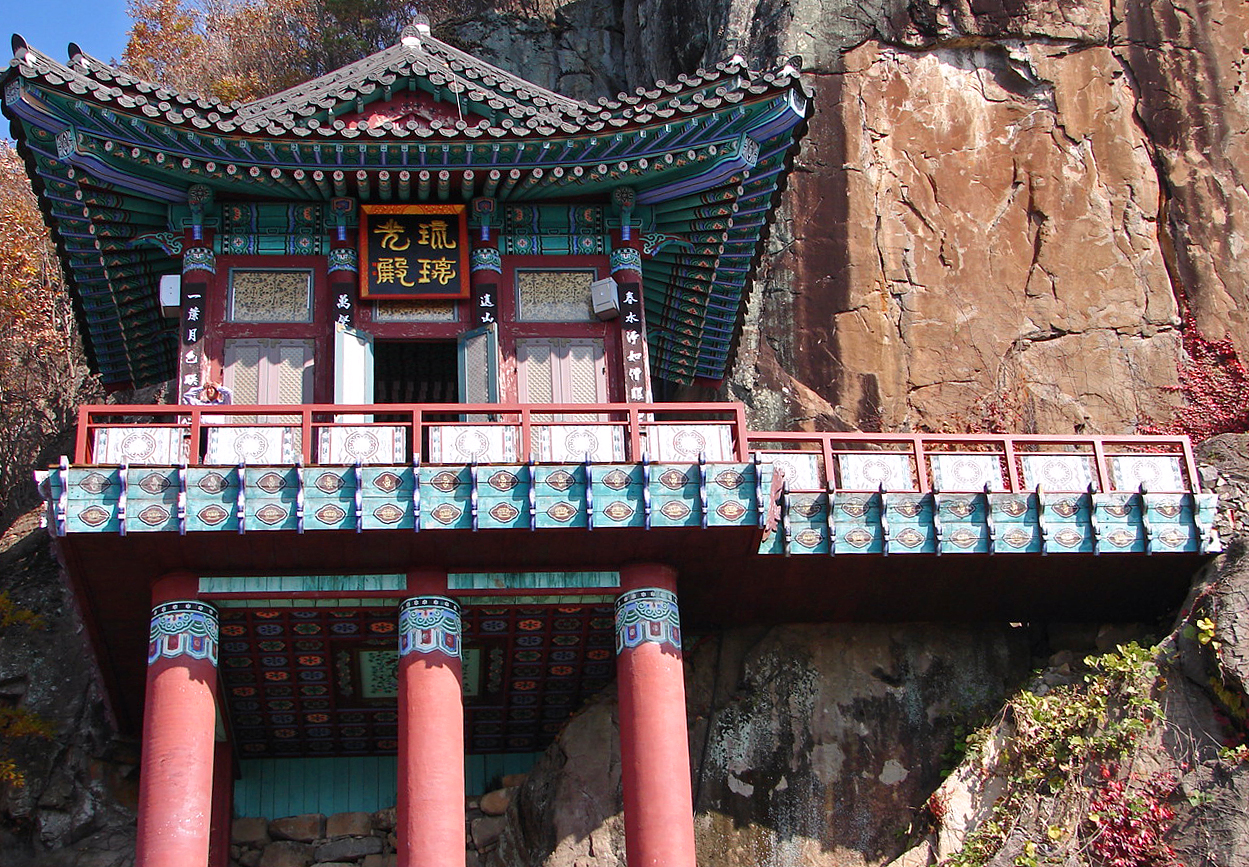
Saseongam Main Hall

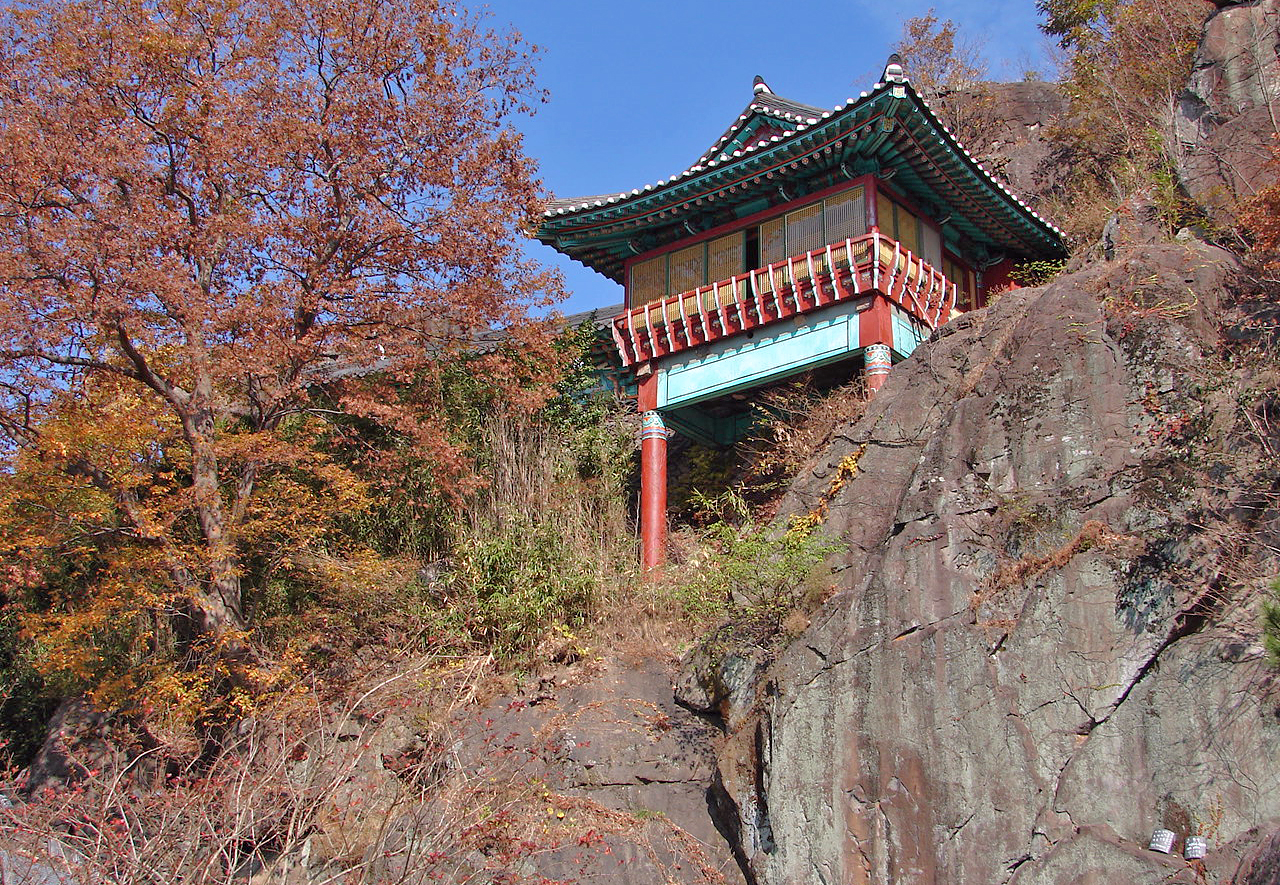
A secondary hall

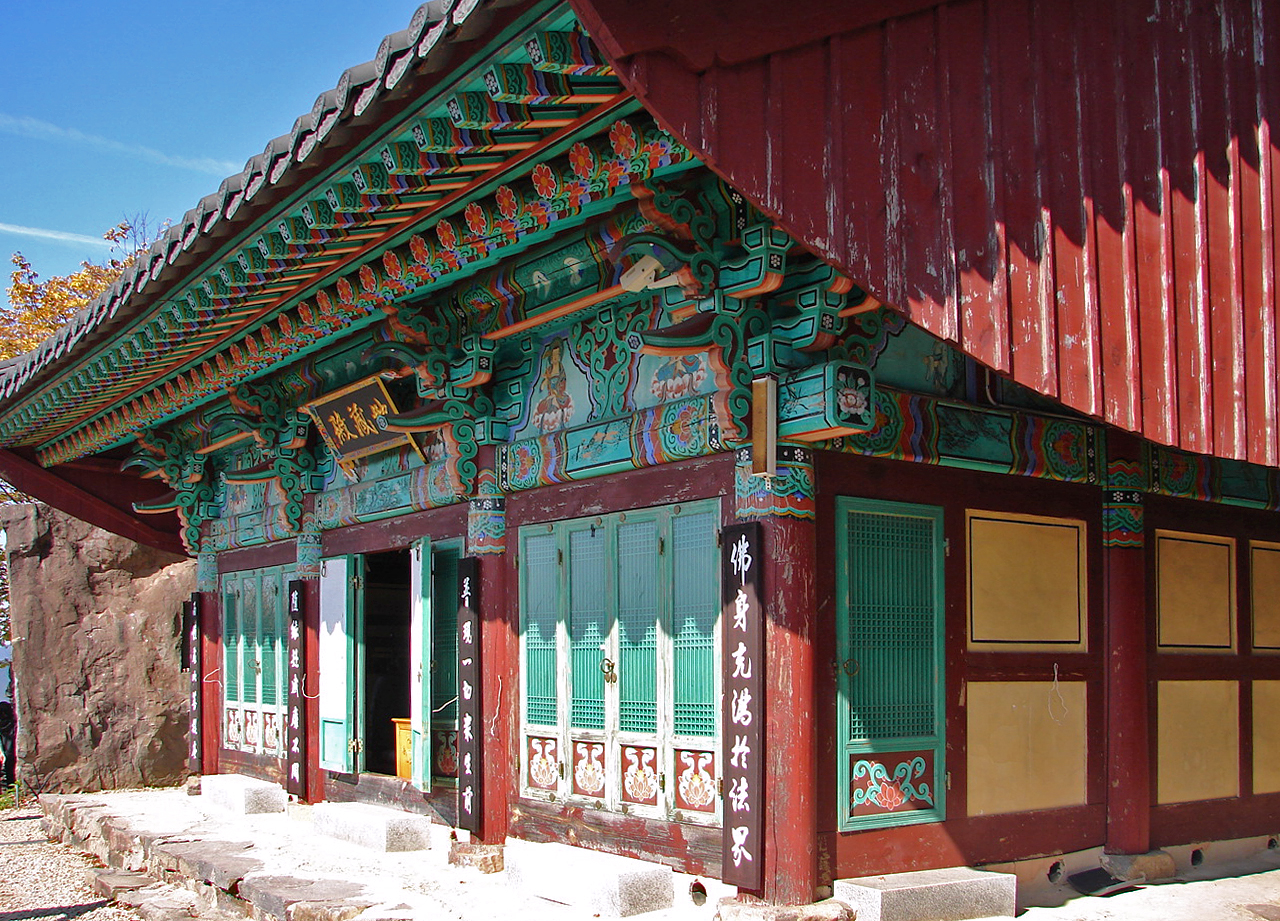
Jijang Hall

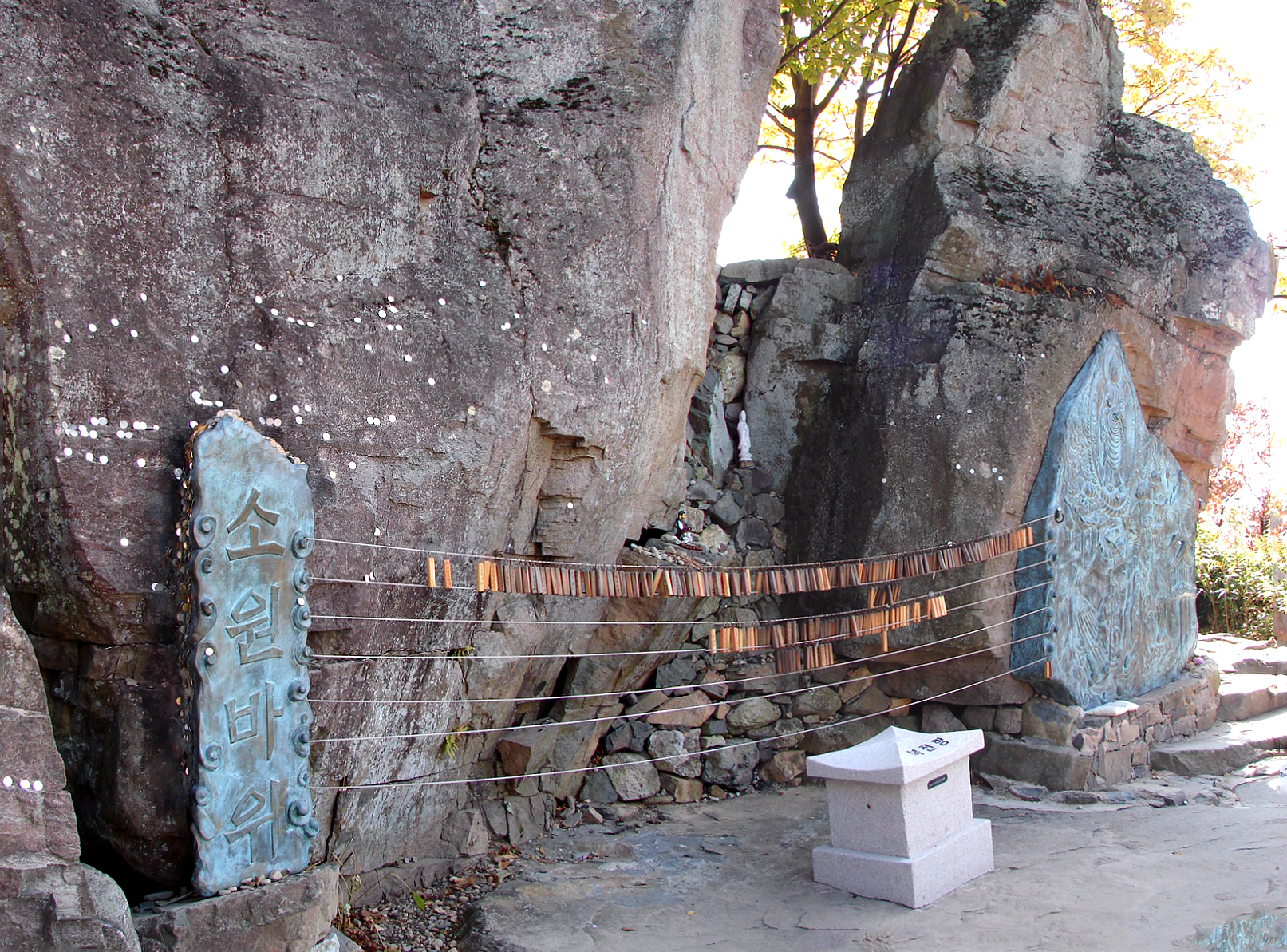
Altar next to Jijang Hall

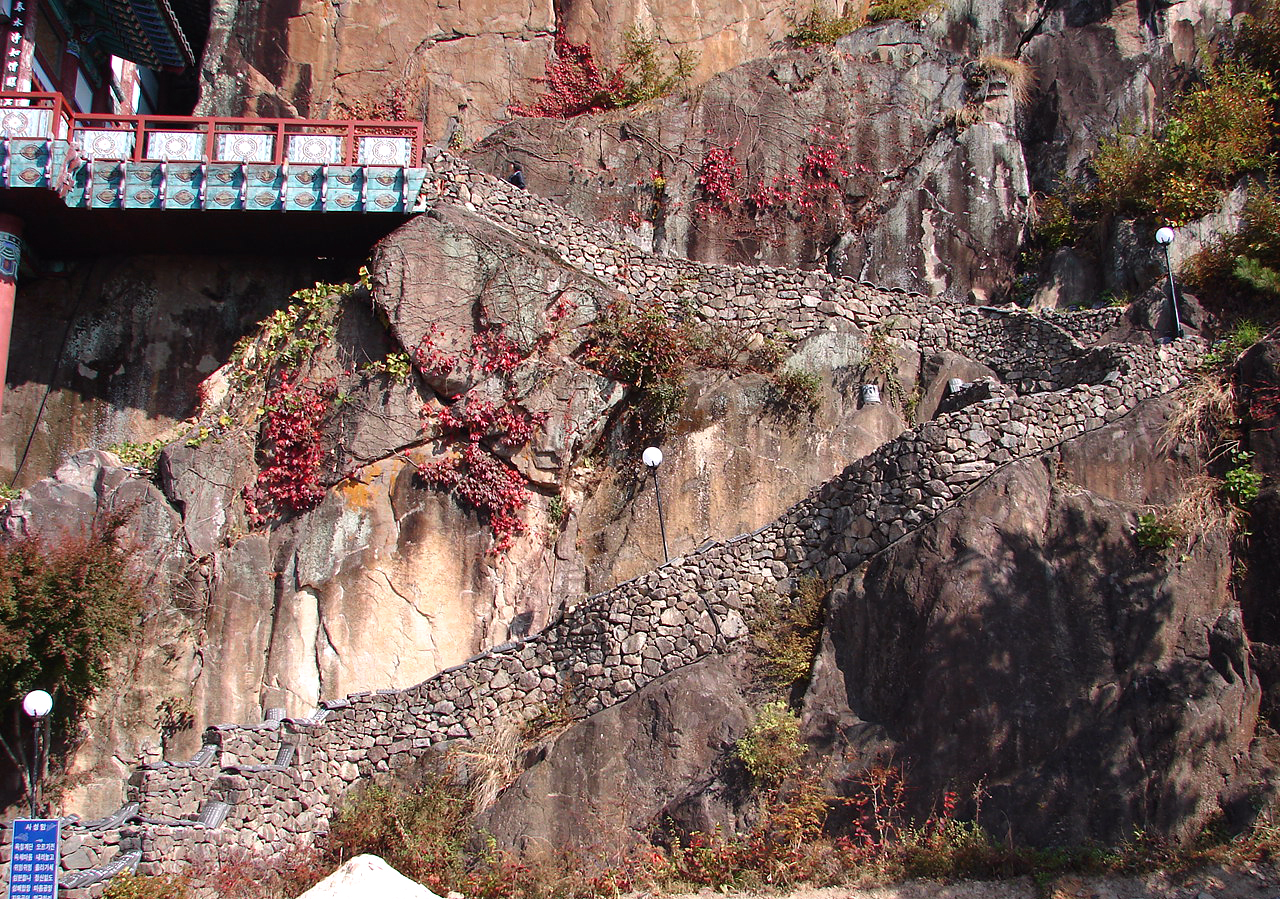
Stairway up to Saseongam Main Hall

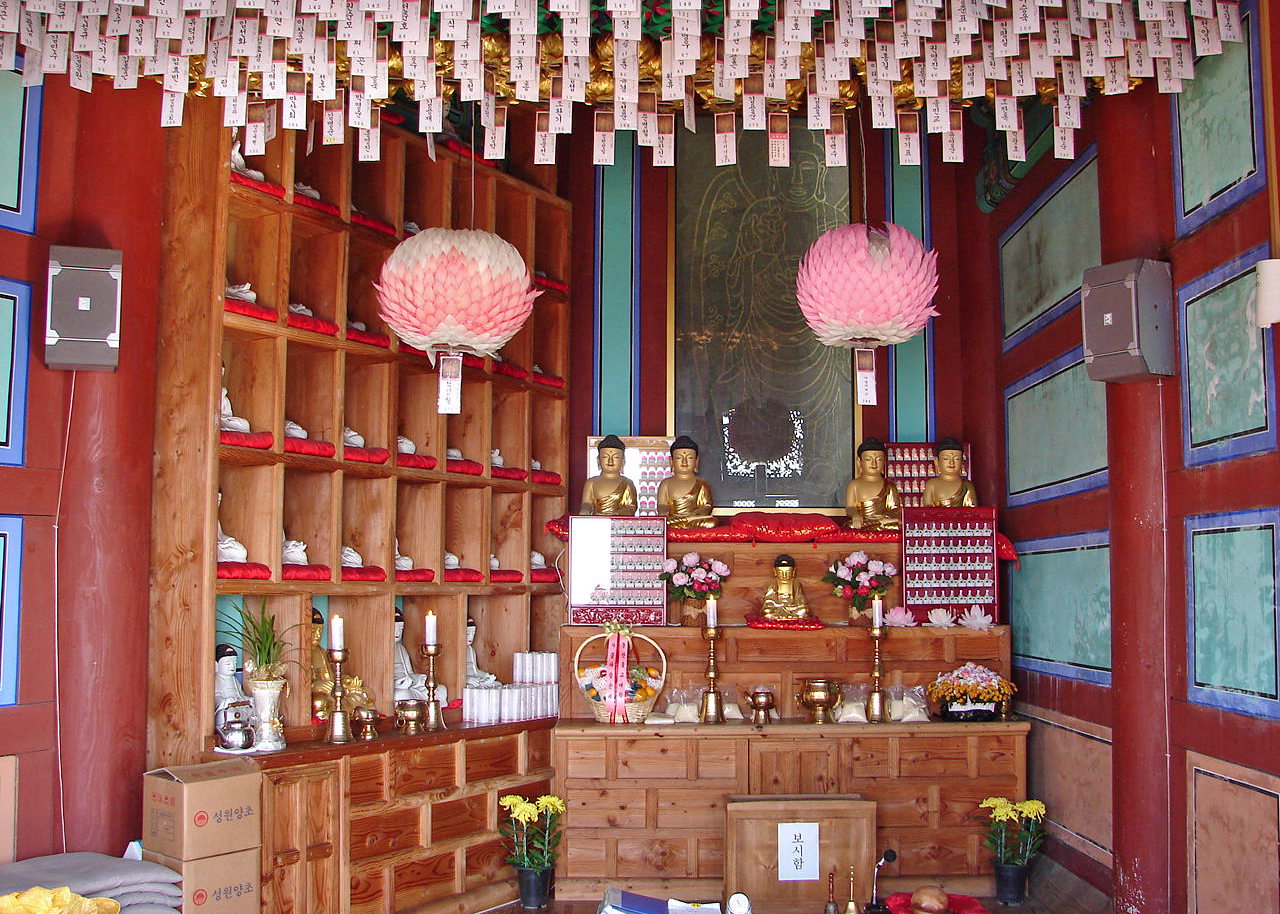
Inside Main Hall

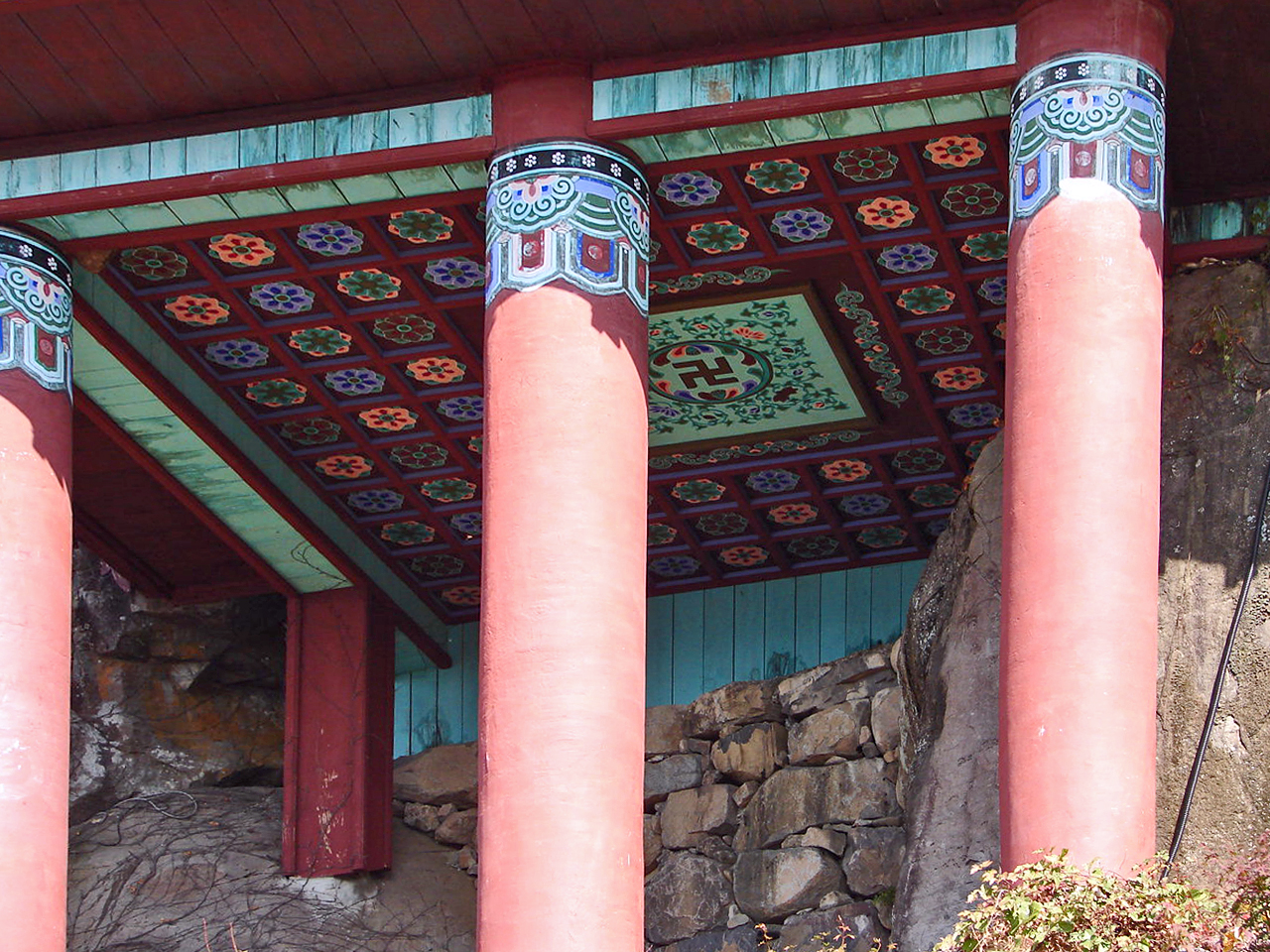
Three pillars supporting Main Hall

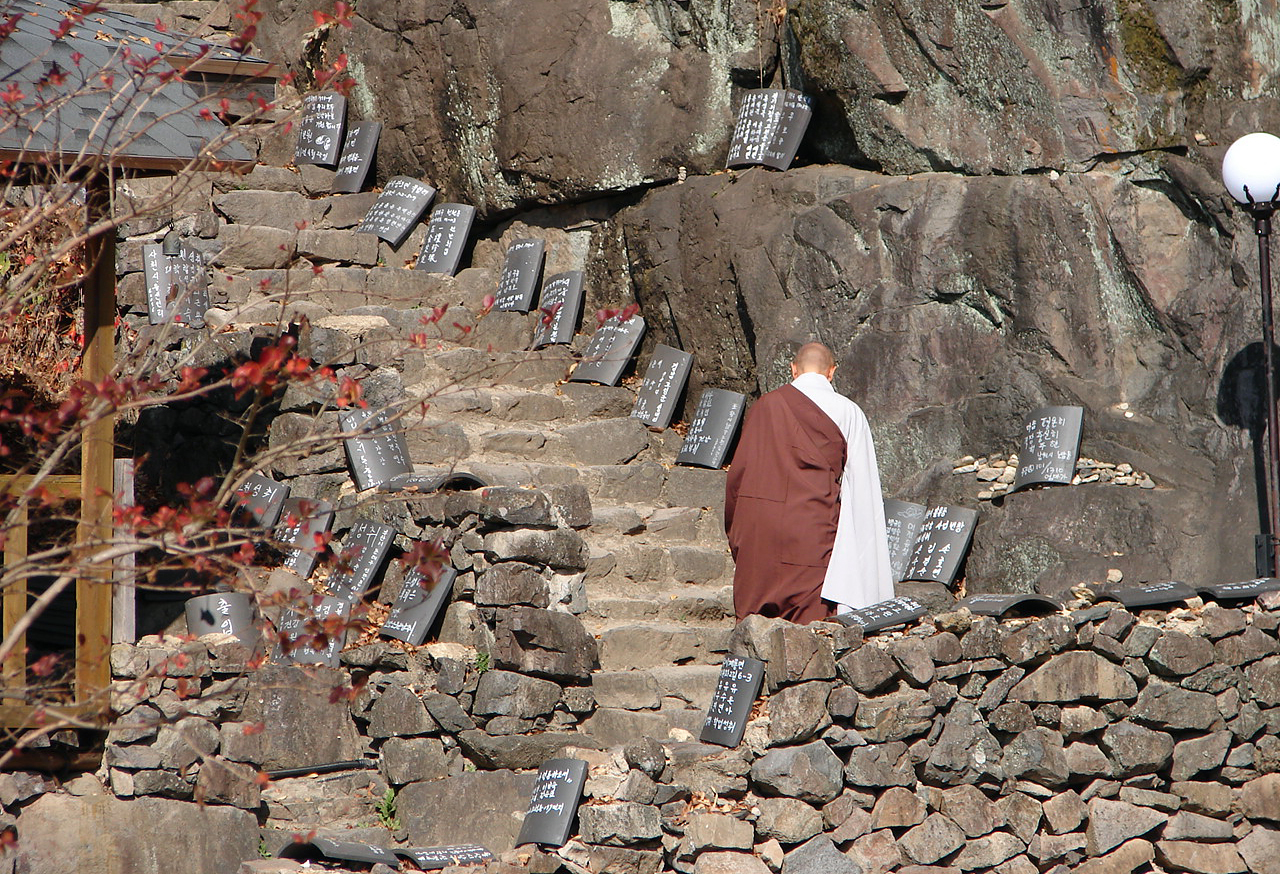
Monk ascending stairway to Jijang Hall

External videos
- Saseongam slideshow
- Saseongam video
