= Maisan =

Mountain in North Jeolla, South Korea

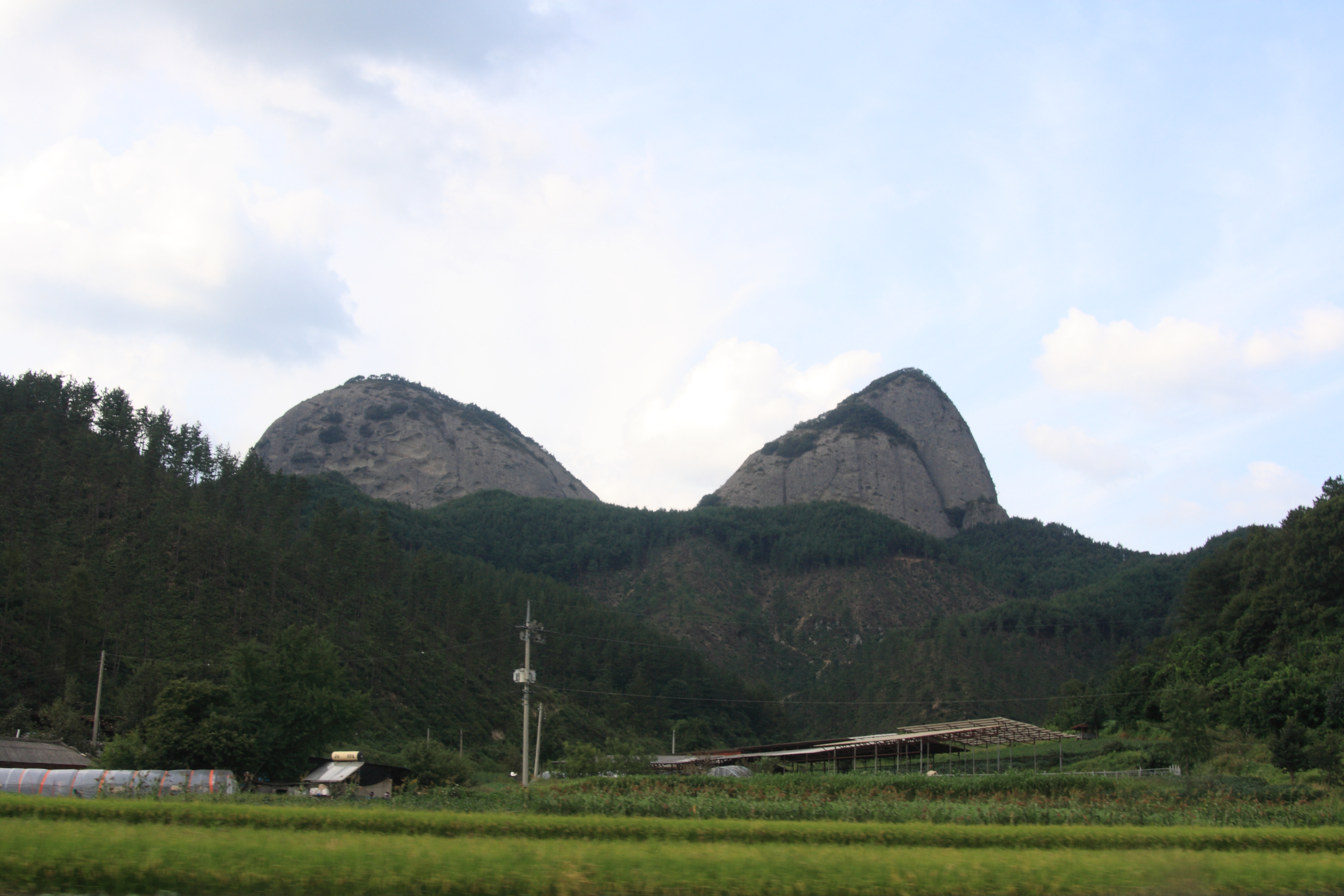

Highest point
- Elevation: 686 m (2,251 ft)
- Coordinates: 35°45′44″N 127°24′17″E

Geography
- Location: North Jeolla Province, South Korea

Scenic Sites of South Korea
- Designated: 2003-10-31

Korean name
- Hangul: 마이산
- Hanja: 馬耳山
- RR: Maisan
- MR: Maisan

Maisan (Korean: 마이산) is a mountain of North Jeolla Province, western South Korea. It has an elevation of 686 metres.

== See also ==
- List of mountains of Korea
