= Oksunbong =

Mountain in South Korea

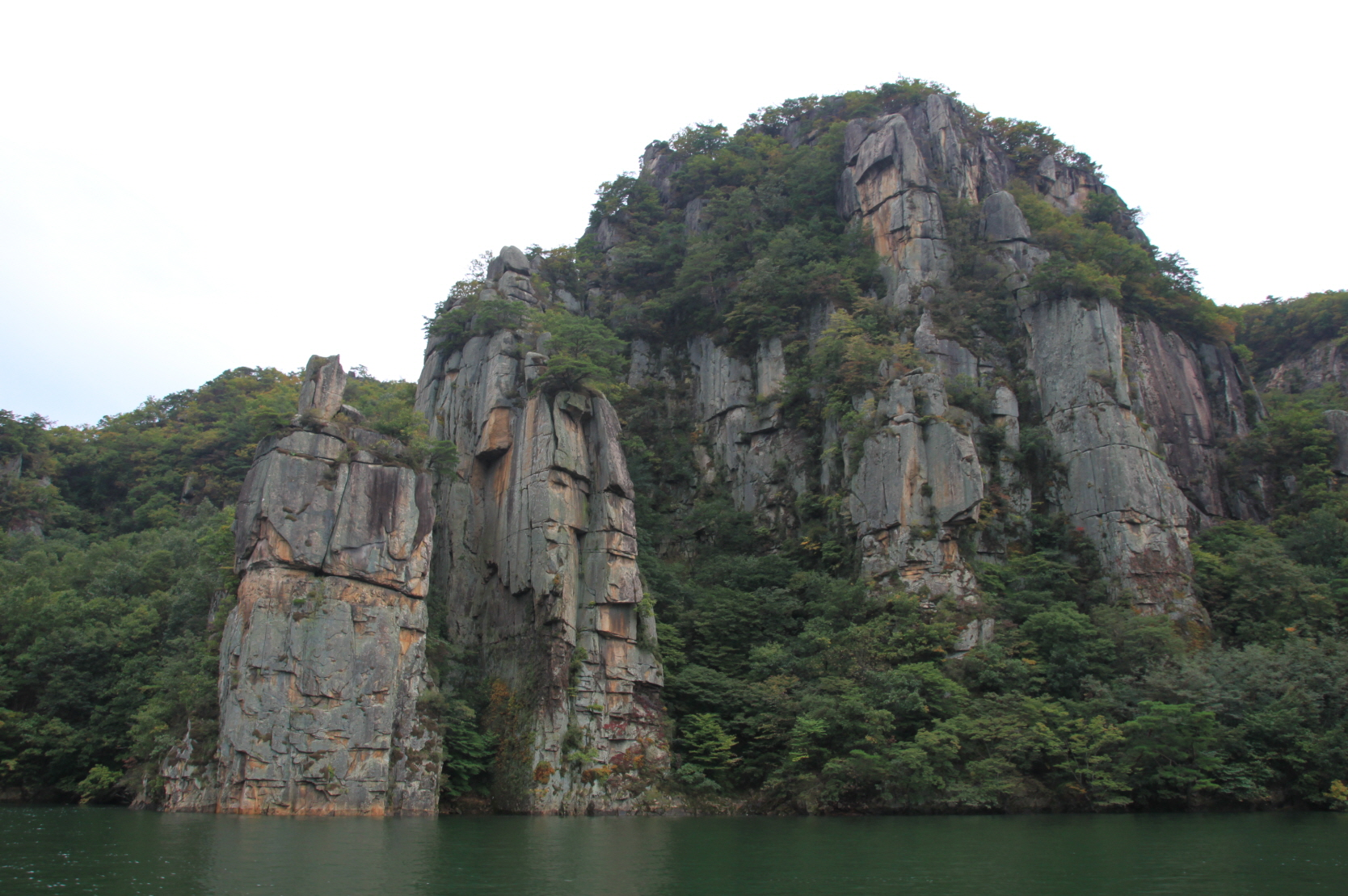

Highest point
- Elevation: 286 m (938 ft)
- Coordinates: 36°56′37″N 128°14′14″E

Geography
- Location: South Korea

Oksunbong is a mountain of Danyang County, North Chungcheong Province, South Korea. It has an elevation of 286 metres.

== See also ==
- List of mountains of Korea
