= Maebongsan (Taebaek) =

Mountain in South Korea

Highest point
- Elevation: 1,303 m (4,275 ft)
- Coordinates: 37.2112°N 128.9669°E

Geography
- Location: South Korea

Korean name
- Hangul: 매봉산
- Hanja: 매峰山
- RR: Maebongsan
- MR: Maebongsan

Maebongsan (Korean: 매봉산) is a mountain in Taebaek County, Gangwon Province, South Korea. It has an elevation of 1,303 m (4,275 ft).

== See also ==
- List of mountains in Korea
