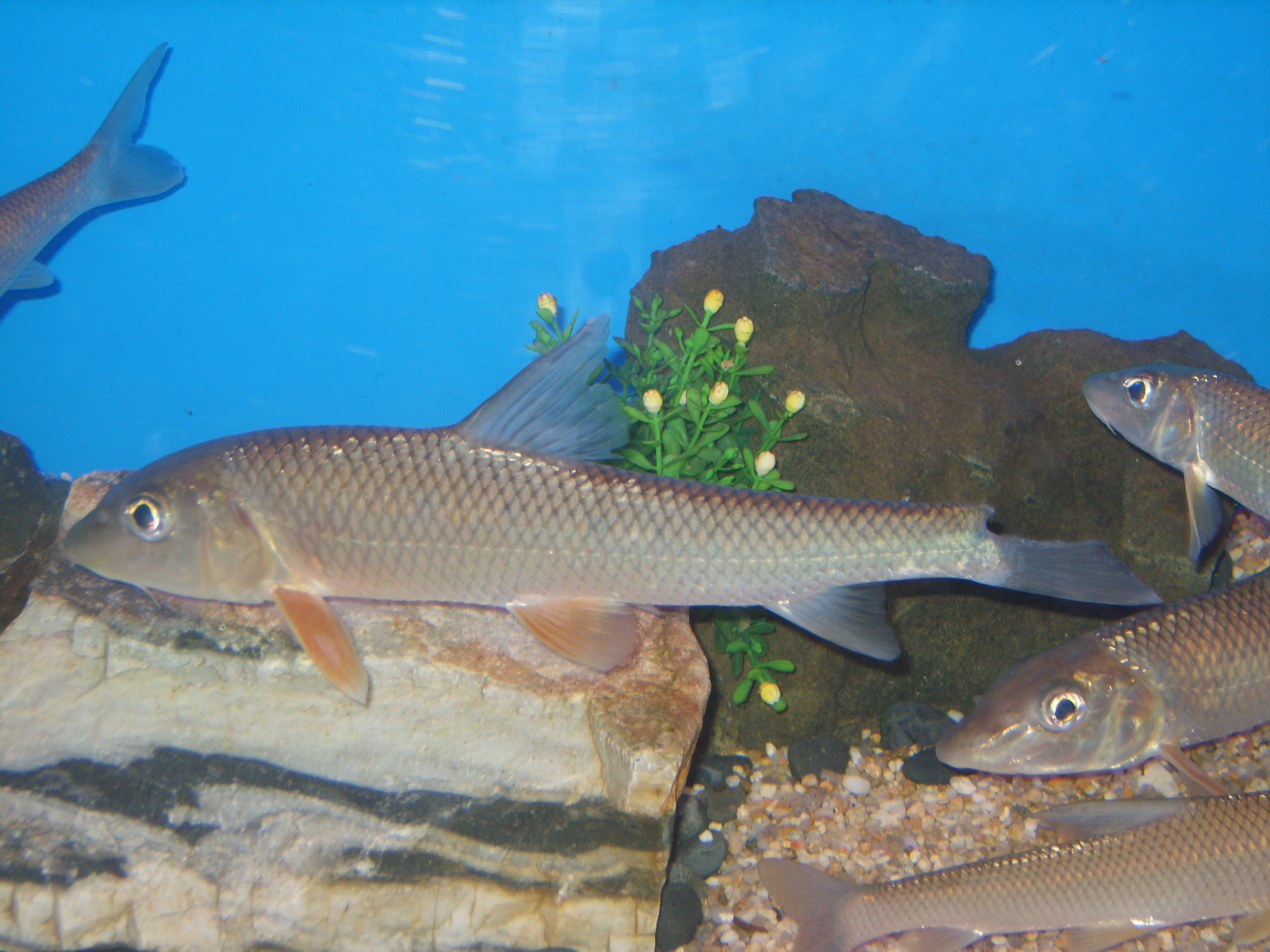
- Barbel steed (Hemibarbus labeo)

Scientific classification
- Kingdom: Animalia
- Phylum: Chordata
- Class: Actinopterygii
- Order: Cypriniformes
- Family: Gobionidae
- Genus: Hemibarbus; Bleeker, 1860

Type species
- Gobio barbus Temminck & Schlegel, 1846

Synonyms
- Gobiobarbus Dybowski, 1869

= Hemibarbus =

Genus of fishes

Hemibarbus is a genus of freshwater ray-finned fishes belonging to the family Gobionidae, the gudgeons. The fishes in this genus are found in eastern Asia.

== Species ==
Hemibarbus contains the following valid species:

- Hemibarbus brevipennus P. Q. Yue, 1995
- Hemibarbus labeo (Pallas, 1776) (Barbel steed)
- Hemibarbus longirostris (Regan 1908)
- Hemibarbus macracanthus Y. L. Lu, P. Q. Luo & Yi-Yu Chen, 1977
- Hemibarbus maculatus Bleeker, 1871 (Spotted steed)
- Hemibarbus medius P. Q. Yue, 1995
- Hemibarbus mylodon (Berg 1907)
- Hemibarbus qianjiangensis T. Yu, 1990
- Hemibarbus songloensis V. H. Nguyễn, 2002
- Hemibarbus thacmoensis V. H. Nguyễn, 2002
- Hemibarbus umbrifer (S.-Y. Lin 1931)
