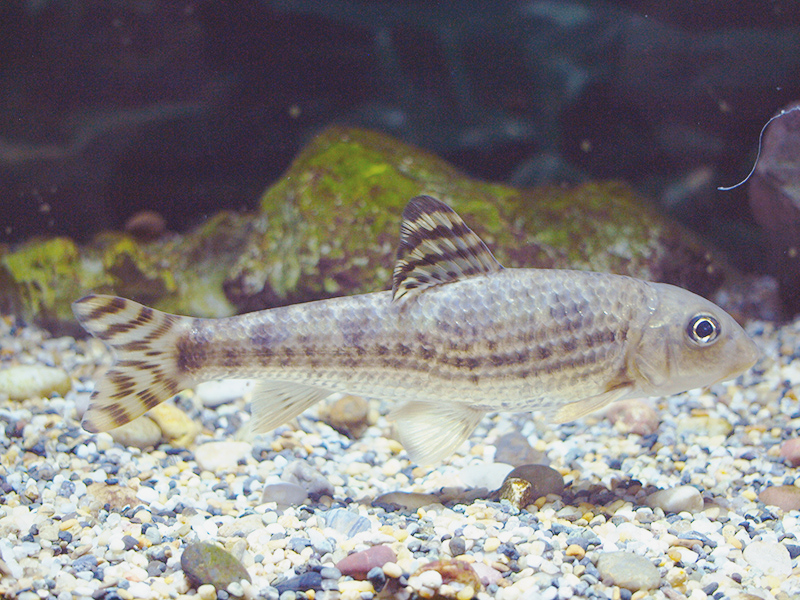

Scientific classification
- Kingdom: Animalia
- Phylum: Chordata
- Class: Actinopterygii
- Order: Cypriniformes
- Suborder: Cyprinoidei
- Family: Gobionidae
- Genus: Hemibarbus
- Species: H. mylodon

Binomial name
- Hemibarbus mylodon Berg, 1907

Synonyms
- Barbus mylodon (Berg, 1907); Gonoproktopterus mylodon (Berg, 1907); Hamibarbus mylodon (Berg, 1907); Hypselobarbus mylodon (Berg, 1907)

= Hemibarbus mylodon =

Species of fish

Hemibarbus mylodon is a species of freshwater fish belonging to the family Gobionidae, the gudgeons. This fish is endemic to Korea. It is commonly called spotted barbel or Korean doty barbel. It inhabits the upper stream of Imjin, Han and Geum River. As of 2008, it is classified as endangered species.

H. mylodon is benthopelagic. It has 3–7 dorsal soft rays and 3–5 anal soft rays. The fish has a peculiarity of building a tower of pebbles and sand to protect its eggs.

== Gallery ==
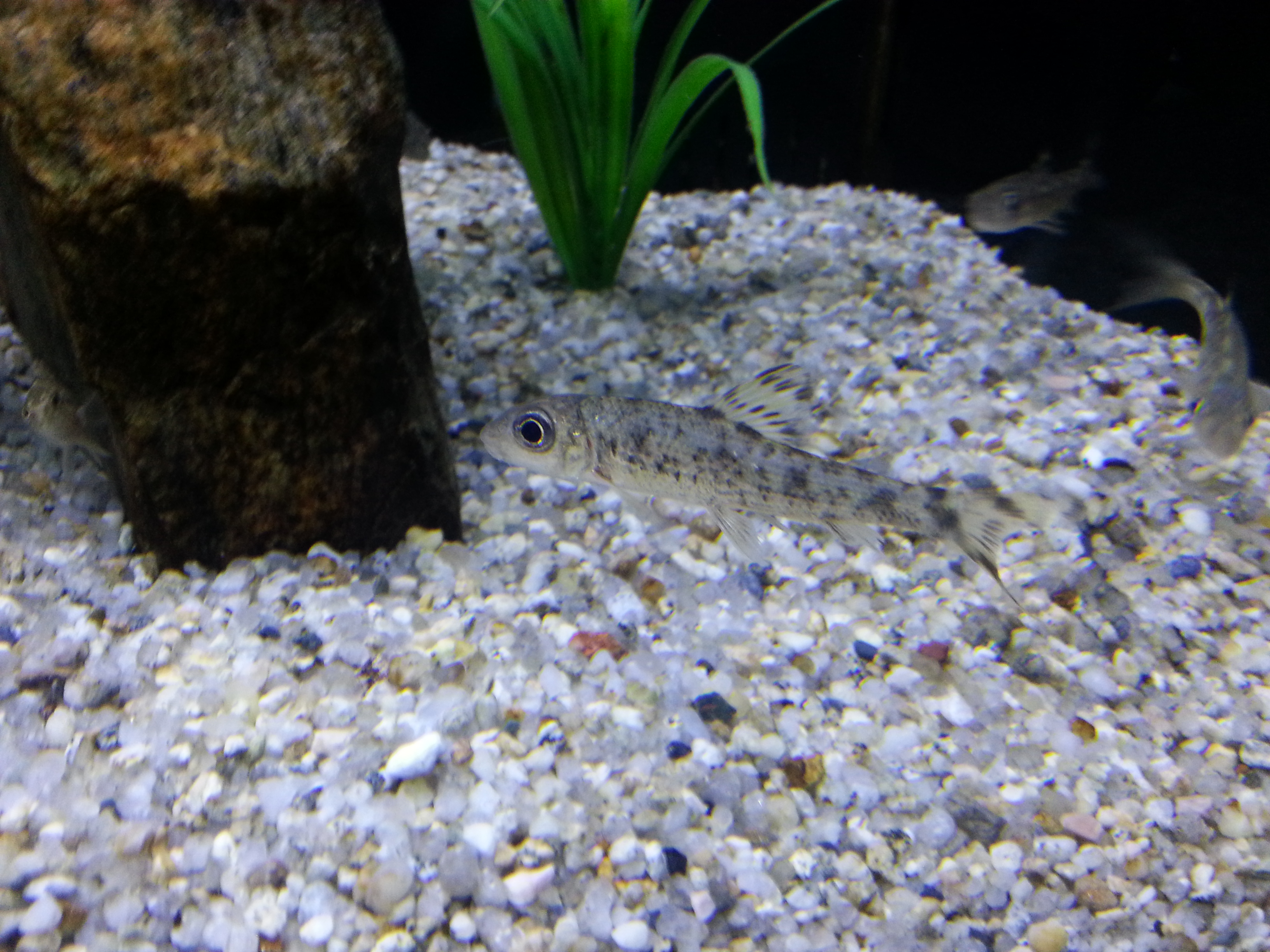
Hemibarbus mylodon
