= Eungbongsan =

Eungbongsan (응봉산; 應峰山) is the name of several mountains in South Korea:

- Eungbongsan (Gangwon/North Gyeongsang) in the city of Samcheok, Gangwon-do and the county of Uljin, Gyeongsangbuk-do. 999 metres.
- Eungbongsan (Hwachon-myeon, Hongcheon) in Hwachon-myeon and Seoseok-myeon, the county of Hongcheon, Gangwon-do. 868 metres.
- Eungbongsan (Nae-myeon, Hongcheon) in Seoseok-myeon and Nae-myeon, the county of Hongcheon, Gangwon-do. 1103 metres.
- Eungbongsan (Yeongwol) in the county of Yeongwol, Gangwon-do. 1013 metres.
- Eungbongsan (Wonju/Yeongwol) in the city of Wonju and the county of Yeongwol, Gangwon-do. 1095 metres.
- Eungbongsan (Seoul) in the district of Seongdong, Seoul. 81 metres.
- Eungbongsan (South Gyeongsang) in the county of Namhae, Gyeongsangnam-do. 472 metres.
- Eungboksan, a.k.a. Eungbongsan, in the counties of Yangyang and Hongcheon, Gangwon-do. 1359 metres.
