= Balgyosan =

Mountain in South Korea

Highest point
- Elevation: 998 m (3,274 ft)

Geography
- Location: South Korea

Korean name
- Hangul: 발교산
- Hanja: 髮校山
- RR: Balgyosan
- MR: Palgyosan

Balgyosan (Korean: 발교산) is a mountain that sits between the counties of Hoengseong and Hongcheon, Gangwon Province, South Korea. It has an elevation of 998 m (3,274 ft).

== See also ==
- List of mountains in Korea
