= Bongboksan =

Mountain in Gangwon Province, South Korea

Highest point
- Elevation: 832 m (2,730 ft)

Geography
- Location: South Korea

Korean name
- Hangul: 봉복산
- Hanja: 鳳腹山
- RR: Bongboksan
- MR: Pongboksan

Bongboksan (Korean: 봉복산) is a mountain in the counties of Hoengseong and Hongcheon, Gangwon Province, South Korea. It has an elevation of 832 m (2,730 ft).

== See also ==
- List of mountains in Korea
