= Oeumsan =

Mountain in South Korea

Coordinates: 38°21′N 128°29′E

Highest point
- Elevation: 930 m (3,050 ft)

Geography
- Location: South Korea

Korean name
- Hangul: 오음산
- Hanja: 五音山
- RR: Oeumsan
- MR: Oŭmsan

Oeumsan (Korean: 오음산) is a mountain in the counties of Hongcheon and Hoengseong, Gangwon Province, South Korea. It has an elevation of 930 m (3,051 ft).

== See also ==
- List of mountains in Korea
