= Deokgosan =

Mountain in South Korea

Highest point
- Elevation: 1,125 m (3,691 ft)

Geography
- Location: South Korea

Korean name
- Hangul: 덕고산
- Hanja: 德高山
- RR: Deokgosan
- MR: Tŏkkosan

Deokgosan (Korean: 덕고산) is a mountain that straddles the counties of Hoengseong and Hongcheon, Gangwon Province, South Korea. It has an elevation of 1,125 m (3,691 ft).

== See also ==
- List of mountains in Korea
