= Korean native =

Korean native or Korean Native may refer to:

- Koreans, the indigenous ethnic group who mostly populate Korea
- Korean-native, an adjective referring to things endemic to Korea (e.g., wildlife of Korea) or associated especially with Korean culture (e.g., Korean folk-art)
- The indigenous portion of Korean vocabulary, i.e. that which is neither Sino-Korean nor other foreign loanwords
- Korean Native cattle (Hanwoo or Hanu), one of the four indigenous breeds of domesticated cattle in Korea
- Korean Native pig, an indigenous breed of domesticated black swine in Korea
