= Three-Story Stone Pagoda in Eupha-ri =

Pagoda in Gangwon, South Korea

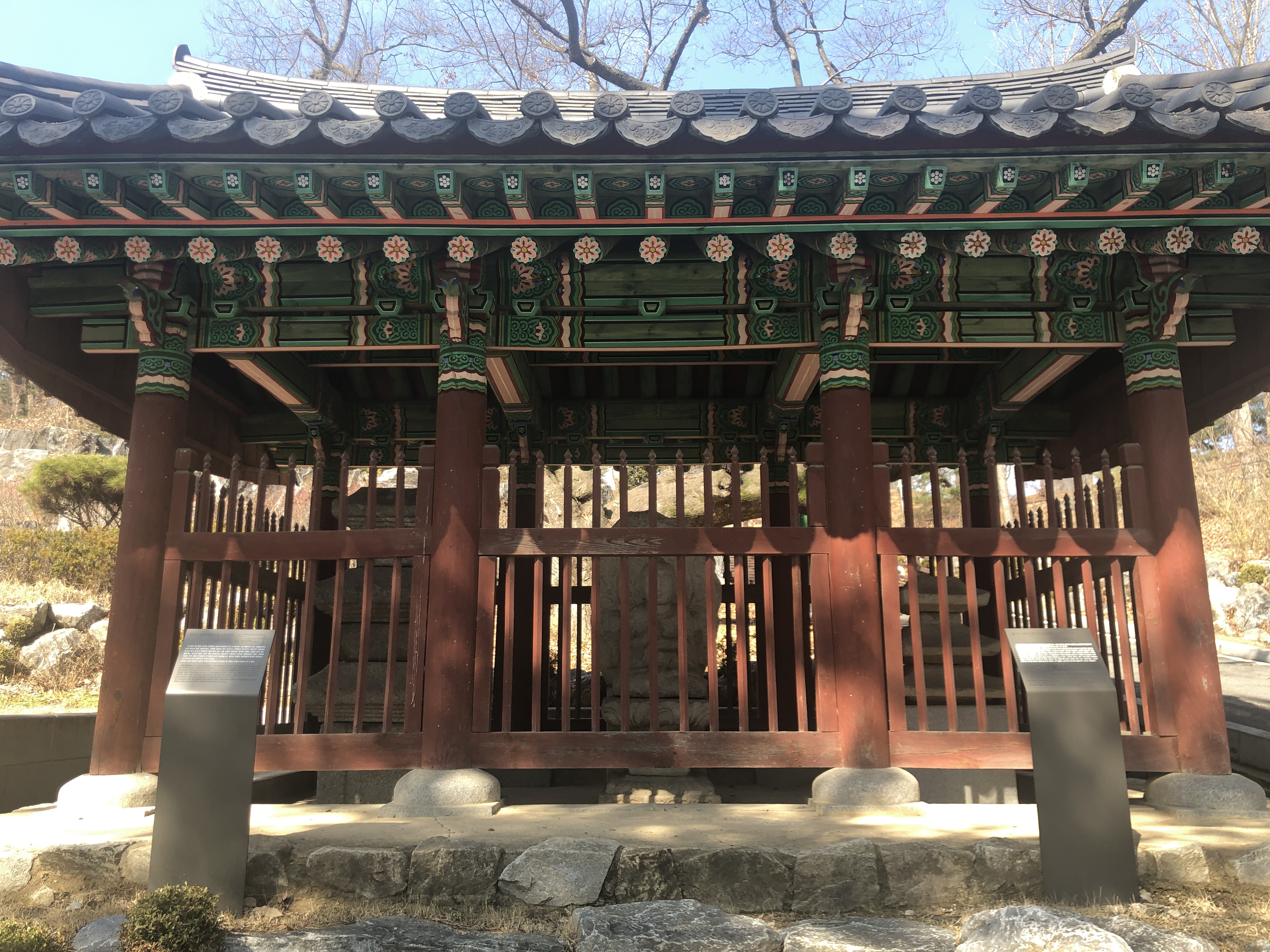
Pagoda in Eupha-ri, 2020, with Seated stone buddha

This pagoda is in original condition, and although the style of the pagoda is similar to that of the three storied pagoda in Sanaclong-ri, Hoengseong, it was constructed at a later time. The props of the roof have four steps. and the eaves are slightly uplifted. A hole where the chalju pillar stood can be seen on the upper surface of the roof stone of the third story. Corner pillars are carved on the body stone, but this pagoda does not have props for the body stones, which was common in stone pagodas of this period. It is believed that this pagoda was moved from a Buddhist temple in Hoengseong, but the name of the temple and its original location are not known.
