= List of Chinese cattle breeds =

This is a list of some of the cattle breeds considered in China to be wholly or partly of Chinese origin. Some may have complex or obscure histories, so inclusion here does not necessarily imply that a breed is predominantly or exclusively Chinese.

Name	Other names, if any	Notes	Image
Altay Whitehead			
Apeijiaza			
Bainiu		extinct	
Bashan			
Bohai Black		Shandong; meat, draught	
Caidamu			
China Simmental			
Chinese Black and White			
Chinese Holstein			
Chinese Kazahk			
Chuannan Mountainous			
Dabieshan		Anhui; draught, meat	
Dangjiao		extinct	
Dengchuan			
Diqing			
Dulong			
Ebian Spotted		Sichuan: draught, meat	
Enshi		Hubei; meat, draught	
Fuzhou		Liaoning; meat, draught	
Ganzhizang	Ganzi Tibetan		
Gaotai		extinct	
Guangfeng		Jiangxi; draught, meat	
Guanling		Guizhou; draught, meat	
Hainan		Hainan; draught, meat	
Hazake		Xinjiang; meat, milk	
Huangpo			
Ji'an			
Jiaxian Red		Henan; meat, draught	
Jinan			
Jiniu		extinct	
Jinjiang			
Jinnan		Shanxi; meat, milk	
Leigiong			
Lhasa			
Liangshan			
Liping			
Longlin		Guangxi; draught, meat	
Luxi		Shandong; meat, draught	
Meiniu		extinct	
Menggu		Nei Mongol; meat, milk	
Mengshan			
Minnan		Fujian; meat, draught	
Nandan			
Nanyang		Henan; meat, milk	
Panjiang			
Pinglu Mountainous		Shanxi; draught, meat	
Pingwu			
Qaidam			
Qinchuan		Shaanxi; meat, milk	
Rikaze Humped			
Sanhe			
Sanjiang		Sichuan; draught, meat	
Shangai		extinct	
Taihang			
Taiwan			
Taiwan Yellow		extinct	
Taiwan Zebu			
Tibetan		Tibet; draught, meat	
Ujumqin			
Wandong			
Wannan		Anhui; draught, meat	
Wanniu		extinct	
Weiling Humped		Yunnan; draught, meat	
Weining			
Weizhou			
Wenshan			
Wuchuan Black			
Wuling			
Wuzhumuqin			
Xiangxi		Hunan; meat, draught	
Xinjiang Brown			
Xuanhan		Sichuan; draught, meat	
Xuzhou			
Yanbian		Jilin; meat, milk	
Yangba		extinct	
Yiling			
Yunnan Humped		Yunnan; draught, meat	
Yunnan Zebu			
Zaobei		Hubei; draught, meat	
Zhangmu			
Zhaotong			
Zhoushan			
