= Hoengseong Korean Beef Festival =

Annual food festival in South Korea

- Date: mid-October
- Locations: Seongang riverside, Hoengseong-eup
- Founder: Hoengseong County
- Organiser: Hoengseong Korean Beef Festival Promotion Committee
- Sponsor: Gangwon Province, Korea Tourism Organization, various public organizations and associations in Hoengseong.
- Website: happyhanwoofestival.com

Hoengseong Korean Beef Festival (Korean: 횡성한우축제) is a festival in Hoengseong, South Korea. The festival's name was originally Hoengseong Taepoong Cultural Festival. In 2004, it changed its name to the current one. The festival promotes the consumption of Korean beef made in Hoengseong, providing opportunities to try Korean beef and experience agricultural programs which cannot be seen in cities.
