= Gongjaksan =

Mountain in Hongcheon, South Korea

Highest point
- Elevation: 887 m (2,910 ft)
- Coordinates: 37°42′56″N 128°00′36″E

Geography
- Location: South Korea

Korean name
- Hangul: 공작산
- Hanja: 孔雀山
- RR: Gongjaksan
- MR: Kongjaksan

Gongjaksan (Korean: 공작산) is a mountain in Hongcheon County, Gangwon Province, South Korea. It has an elevation of 887 m (2,910 ft). It is in the GMT+9 time zone.

== See also ==
- List of mountains in Korea
