= Geummulsan =

Mountain in South Korea

Highest point
- Elevation: 791 m (2,595 ft)
- Coordinates: 37.553612°N 127.849150°E

Geography
- Location: South Korea

Korean name
- Hangul: 금물산
- Hanja: 今勿山
- RR: Geummulsan
- MR: Kŭmmulsan

Geummulsan (Korean: 금물산) is a mountain in South Korea. Its area extends across Hoengseong, Gangwon Province and Yangpyeong County, Gyeonggi Province. Geummulsan has an elevation of 791 m (2,595 ft).

== See also ==
- List of mountains in Korea
