= Hu Dagu =

Short story

- Short story by Pu Songling
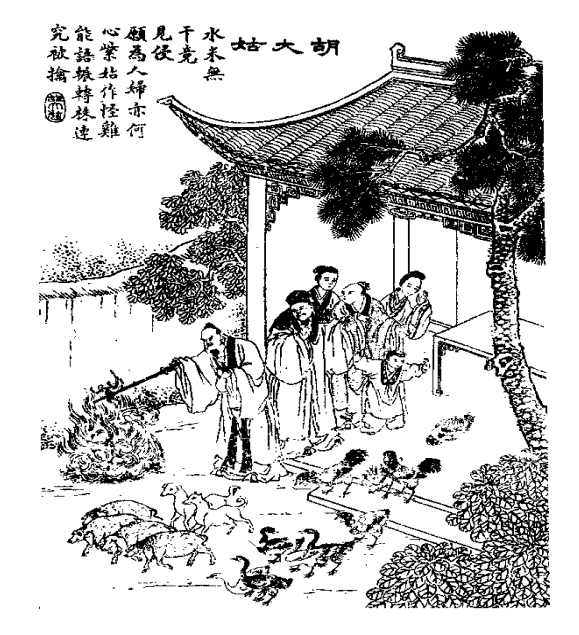
- Illustration from Xiangzhu liaozhai zhiyi tuyong (Liaozhai Zhiyi with commentary and illustrations; 1886)
- Original title: 胡大姑 (Hu Dagu)
- Translator: Sidney L. Sondergard (2008)
- Country: China
- Language: Chinese
- Genres: Zhiguai; Chuanqi; Short story

Publication
- Published in: Strange Tales from a Chinese Studio
- Publication date: 1740
- Published in English: 2008

Chronology
Lin Shi (林氏)	Xi Hou (细侯)

"Hu Dagu" (Chinese: 胡大姑; pinyin: Hú Dàgū) is a short story by Pu Songling first published in Strange Tales from a Chinese Studio (first published 1740). The story follows a Shandong family that is terrorised by the title character—a malevolent fox spirit—who wishes to betroth the patriarch's son. Pu modelled the antagonist after a female latrine spirit worshipped in ancient Chinese folk religion.

== Plot ==
In Yidu, Shandong, the Yue (岳) family is tormented by an evil fox spirit. One day, the fox metamorphosises into a pleasant-looking lady and the family's patriarch, Yujiu (于九), attempts to broker peace by proposing that she join the family as his daughter. She rejects this but agrees to be his sister, who is henceforth referred to as Great Aunt Hu (胡大姑). Nevertheless, she continues to provoke others, especially Yue's daughter-in-law. Hu announces that she will only desist if his son divorces his current wife and marries her instead, to which Yue's daughter-in-law angrily rebukes her. While trying to coerce him into following her proposal, the fox spirit strikes Yue's son in the head, killing him.

Yue enlists the help of exorcist Li Chengyao (李成爻), who gathers the family's livestock and identifies a chicken amongst them as the Zigu (紫姑) spirit. The family admits to inviting the Zigu into their household three years ago; Li entraps the chicken in a wine bottle, while Yue burns the mannequin used to invoke the spirit. However, instead of killing the spirit, Li adds it to his home collection of fox spirits; it is alleged that Li systematically releases them into other households in order that he is hired to exorcise them.

== Publication history ==
Originally titled "Hu Dagu" (胡大姑), the story was first published in Pu Songling's anthology of close to five hundred short stories, Strange Tales from a Chinese Studio or Liaozhai Zhiyi. The story has been translated into English, including in the third volume of Sidney L. Sondergard's Strange Tales from Liaozhai (2008) as "Elder Sister Hu".

== Sources ==
The "Hu" (胡) in "Hu Dagu" is homophonous with the Chinese word for "fox" (狐). According to traditional Anhui and northern Jiangsu lore, fox spirits manifested themselves as three sisters, referred to as Dagu (大姑; eldest aunt), Ergu (二姑; second aunt), and Sangu (三姑; third aunt). Similarly, in Beijing, fox spirits were believed to appear as a group of three aunts collectively known as Sangu (三姑; three aunts) or Xiangulaotai (仙姑老太; divine grannies). The Yanshan conglu or Complete Records of Yanshan (燕山叢錄), published in 1602, includes a brief account of "destructive haunting" amidst its collection of fox tales.

The fox spirit in Pu's story is identified as the Zigu (紫姑; literally "Purple Maiden"), first described during the Six Dynasties as a concubine named He Mei (何媚) who was abused by her husband's wife and died in the latrine; according to Xu Dishan, the name "Zigu" itself was borrowed from Taoist fox spirit nomenclature during the Six Dynasties. In rural north China, female villagers would "invite" the Zigu as part of New Year festivities, by praying to a mannequin of her in the latrine. By the Ming dynasty, the Zigu had become three sisters who commandeered the "celestial equivalent of a toilet bowl" and the supposed birthplace of all living things, the hunyuan jindou (混元金斗).

== Themes and motifs ==
Xiaofei Kang writes that the story "exemplifies the contrast between the two types of fox", namely the malevolent fox spirit terrorising Yue Yujiu's family and the benevolent one living in their neighbour Zhang's house. Because fox spirits in general also represent financial opportunity, Yue does not immediately attempt to drive the fox away but tries to negotiate with her instead. Kang suggests that Yue "sought to take the fox's powers under his own control and make her serve the family's interests" by offering her a place in the family as either his daughter or his sister. However, the fox spirit demands "a permanent place" in the household as Yue's daughter-in-law, echoing the commonly held notion during Pu Songling's time that "shrewish wives and unruly daughters-in-law" were an "unsettling factor in Chinese family life", with some even resorting to witchcraft to manipulate their husbands and "undermine old family ties". The fox and the daughter-in-law are ultimately presented as "interchangeable yet mutually exclusive entities, representing and reversing order and disorder", and Yue encounters as much difficulty in communicating with his daughter-in-law as he does negotiating with the fox spirit. As the fox spirit herself insinuates, the root cause of the problem is Yue's daughter-in-law who invited her into the household three years ago.

According to Kang, "Hu Dagu" also details "how religious professionals intervened in family life with their exorcistic power"—it is a spirit medium, Li Chengyao, who is able to exorcise the fox spirit and seize control of its supernatural abilities. Moreover, the exorcism of the fox spirit links the evil to a commonplace "symbol of female subversion and menace" and leads to the "ritual exposure of a symbolic scapegoat" which has a cathartic effect on Yue and his family, even if the potentially problematic daughter-in-law were not to be directly dealt with.

Sidney Sondergard comments that Pu is highlighting "the consequences of unwitting veneration", as evidenced by Li Chengyao's criticism of the Yue family's "virtual obeisance" to the fox spirit. She compares "Hu Dagu" with other Strange Tales entries as "Peng Haiqiu" and "Xiaoxie" to show how Pu "tends to be much more versatile in his presentation of spirits and deities" while "(challenging) intellectual complacency".
