= Yanbian (disambiguation) =

Yanbian may refer to:

- Yanbian Korean Autonomous Prefecture, Jilin, China
  - Yanbian cattle
- Yanbian County, Sichuan, China
