= Jeju Black pig =

Korean breed of pig

Jeju Black
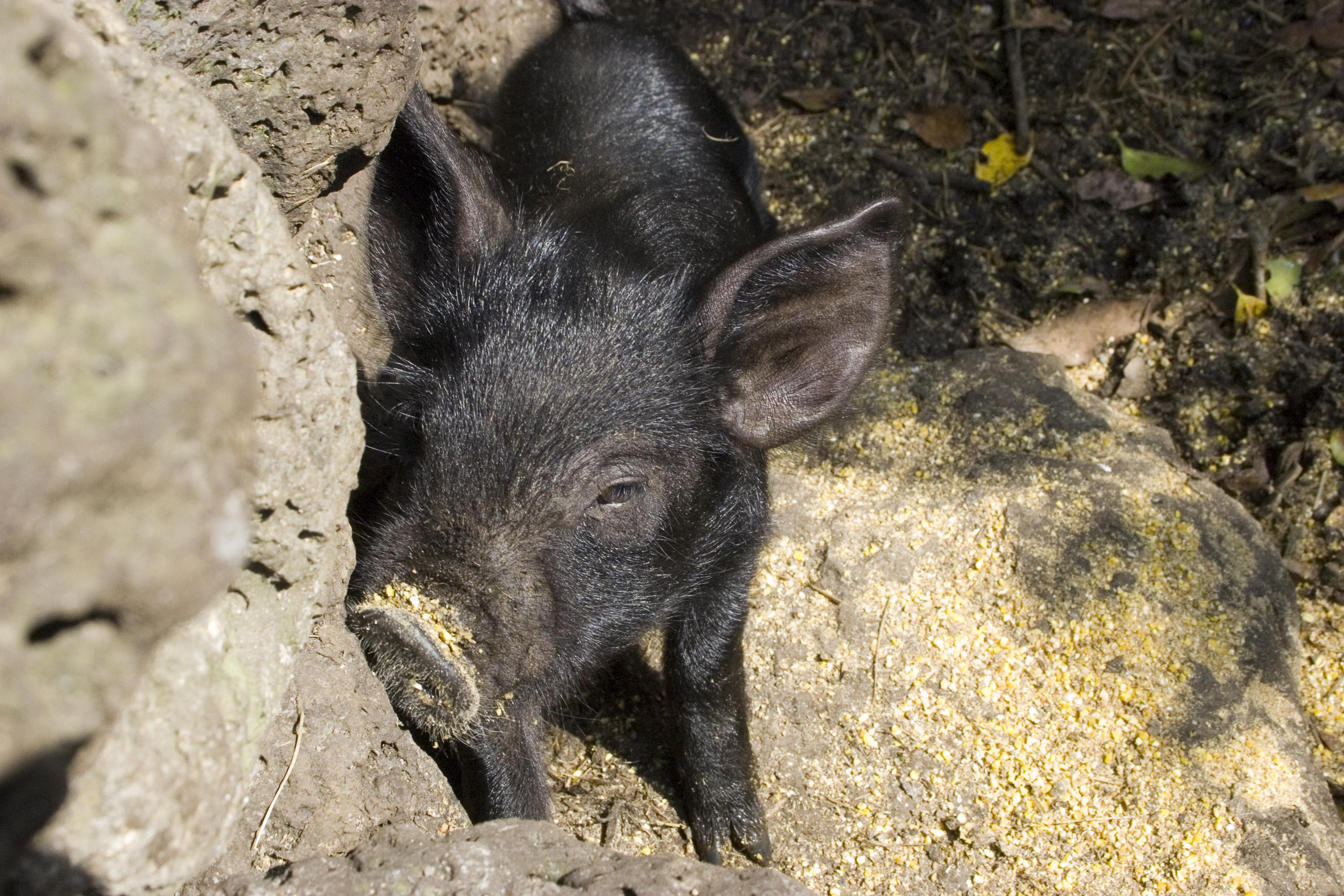
- A piglet
- Country of origin: Korea

Traits

The Jeju Black (Korean: 제주흑돼지; RR: Jeju heukdwaeji) is a Korean breed of domestic pig. It is named for and originates from Jeju Island, which lies to the south of the country in the Korea Strait. It is a small pig, with black skin and a smooth coat of hair. It has erect, unfolded ears, as well as a narrow snout.

Under a co-operative agreement between North and South Korea, about US$160,000 worth of equipment was shipped in 2008 from Jeju Island to North Korea to build a Jeju Black pig farm in Pyongyang; breeding stock was to follow when the farm was ready.

== As food ==
Pork from the Jeju Black is said to have a unique taste, and forms the basis of some local dishes. It is smoked over burning hay, which gives it an unusual flavour and a chewy consistency.

Until the late twentieth century, these pigs were used in pig toilets. The pigs were housed in pits dug below outhouses, and they ate the waste that dropped down. From the 1960s, this practice gave way to more conventional feeding. Some believe that the change has adversely affected the flavour of the meat.

== See also ==
- Jeju Black
- Jeju horse
- List of smoked foods
