= Unmusan =

Mountain in South Korea

Highest point
- Elevation: 980.3 m (3,216 ft)

Geography
- Location: South Korea

Korean name
- Hangul: 운무산
- Hanja: 雲霧山
- RR: Unmusan
- MR: Unmusan

Unmusan (Korean: 운무산) is a mountain in Hoengseong County, Gangwon Province, South Korea. It has an elevation of 980.3 m (3,216 ft).

== See also ==
- List of mountains in Korea
