= Namdaebong =

Mountain in South Korea

Highest point
- Elevation: 1,187 m (3,894 ft)

Geography
- Location: South Korea

Korean name
- Hangul: 남대봉
- Hanja: 南台峰
- RR: Namdaebong
- MR: Namdaebong

Namdaebong (Korean: 남대봉) is a mountain between Wonju and Hoengseong County, in Gangwon Province, South Korea. It has an elevation of 1,187 m (3,894 ft).

== See also ==
- List of mountains in Korea
