= Yaksusan =

Mountain in South Korea

Coordinates: 37°53′N 128°32′E

Highest point
- Elevation: 1,306.2 m (4,285 ft)

Geography
- Location: South Korea

Korean name
- Hangul: 약수산
- Hanja: 藥水山
- RR: Yaksusan
- MR: Yaksusan

Yaksusan (Korean: 약수산) is a mountain in Hongcheon County, Gangwon Province, South Korea. It has an elevation of 1,306.2 m (4,285 ft).

== See also ==
- List of mountains in Korea
