= Palbongsan =

- Palbongsan (South Chungcheong) in the city of Seosan, Chungcheongnam-do. 382 metres.
- Palbongsan (Gangwon) in the county of Hongcheon, Gangwon-do in South Korea. 302 metres.
- Palbongsan (South Hamgyong) in the county of Kowon, Hamgyongnam-to. 1055 metres.
