= Eungboksan =

Mountain in Gangwon Province, South Korea

Highest point
- Elevation: 1,359.6 m (4,461 ft)
- Coordinates: 37°53′N 128°34′E

Geography
- Location: South Korea

Korean name
- Hangul: 응복산
- Hanja: 鷹伏山
- RR: Eungboksan
- MR: Ŭngboksan

Eungboksan (Korean: 응복산) is a mountain in the counties of Yangyang and Hongcheon, Gangwon Province, in South Korea. It has an elevation of 1,359.6 m (4,461 ft).

== See also ==
- List of mountains in Korea
