= Zigu =

Chinese goddess of the latrine

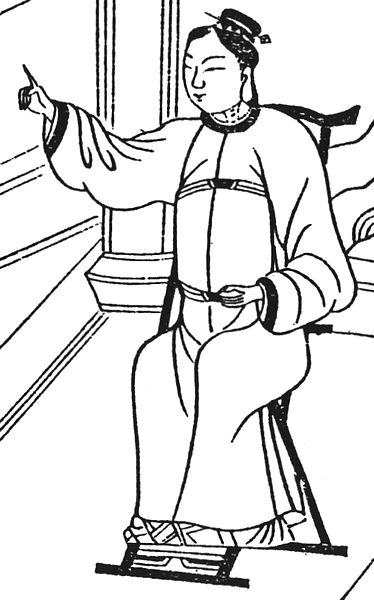
Zigu

Zigu (Chinese: 紫姑; lit. 'the Lady of the Latrine or the Third Daughter of the Latrine'), also known as Maogu, is a goddess representing toilets in Chinese folk religion. She was believed to be the spirit of a concubine who had been physically abused by a vengeful wife and died in the latrine. It is believed that her cult originated in the Shanxi region and spread across China by the Tang period.

According to the legend, the true identity of Zigu is Consort Qi of the Han dynasty, who was tortured and killed in the toilet by Empress Lü.

The earliest record of Zigu is in the fifth volume of "Yiyuan" by Liu Jingshu or Liu Song of the Southern dynasties (420–479).

Other legends say that her real name is He Mingmei, and the word is Liqing, from Laiyang, Shandong. During the period of Empress Wu Zetian, the governor of Shouyang Li Jing killed He Mei's husband and regarded her as a concubine, which made He Mei jealous of Li Jing's chief wife. On the night of the fifteenth day of the first lunar month during the Lantern Festival, Li Jing's legitimate wife killed her in the toilet. Because He Mei had resentment in her heart, Li Jing often heard crying when he visited the toilet. Later, this matter was learned by the Heavenly Court that "the Jade Emperor is merciful" and established her as the god of toilets.

== Worship ==
In Chinese mythology, there are six household deities. The two most notable categories of these are the "door gods" and the "toilet gods". Toilet gods have been worshipped since the Six Dynasties period. The door gods and toilet gods were very popular during the Tang and Song dynasties.

Among the toilet gods, Zigu and Sanxiao Niangniang are particularly enshrined. Women worshipped her in the form of a homemade doll on the fifteenth day of the first month each year, when she was ritually summoned in the latrine during the night. Prayers were said to the doll, telling her that the husband and wife had gone and that she could come out safely. The motions of the doll – sometimes manifested as automatic writing – were used for fortune telling by the worshippers. Another interpretation came from a popular novel of the Ming period, which portrayed the latrine deity as three sisters who were responsible for the Primeval Golden Dipper (hunyuan jindou) or celestial toilet bowl, from which all beings were born.

== See also ==
- Toilet god
