= Seated stone Buddha statue in Eupha-ri =

Goryeo-era statue in Gangwon, South Korea

Coordinates: 37°29′32″N 127°59′07″E

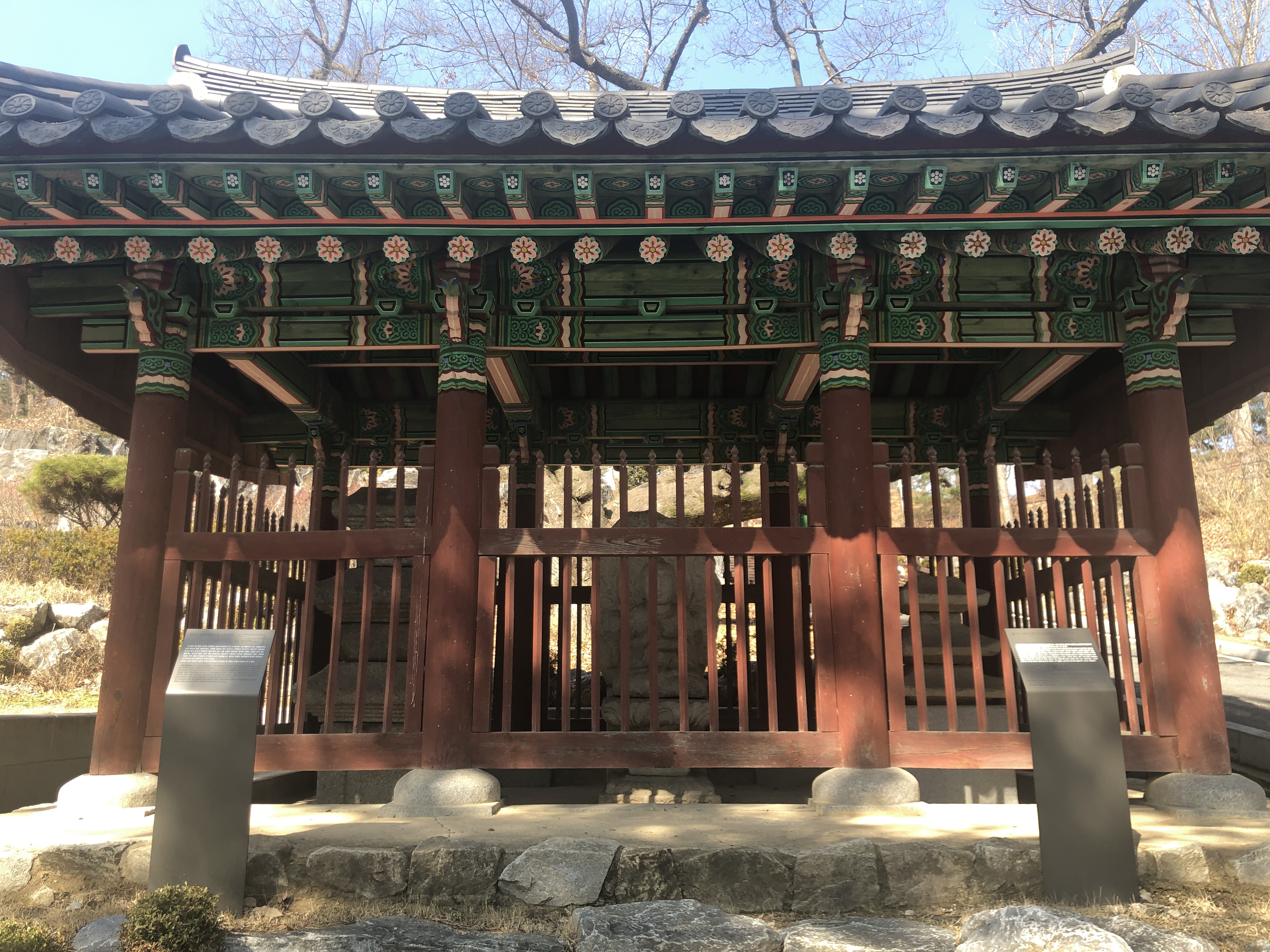
Seated stone Buddha statue

The seated stone Buddha statue in Eupha-ri (Korean: 횡성 읍하리 석불좌상) is a Goryeo-era (918–1392) statue located in Hongseong-eup, Eupha-ri, Gangwon Province, South Korea. It is the Gangwon Province Tangible Cultural Property No. 22.

It was originally located in an old temple site at Sangdong-ri, Gonggeun-myeon, Hoengseong together with a stone pagoda. During the Occupation of Japanese it was moved to its present location. This statue has its hands in the jigwonin position: both hands are gathered at the chest and the index finger of the left hand is covered by the right hand. This was typical of Vairocana symbolizing truth. The back halo is ship-shaped. On both lower part of the halo a standing Bodhisattva is embossed indicating that it was intended to be in the form samjon-hveongsik which has two images of Bodhisattva; one on each of the two sides, centering around the Buddhist image. This example is so rare as to be noteworthy.
