= Palbongsan (Gangwon) =

Mountain in Hongcheon, Gangwon-do in South Korea

Coordinates: 37°42′10″N 127°45′14″E

Highest point
- Elevation: 302 m (991 ft)

Geography
- Location: South Korea

Korean name
- Hangul: 팔봉산
- Hanja: 八峯山
- RR: Palbongsan
- MR: P'albongsan

Palbongsan (Korean: 팔봉산) is a mountain in Hongcheon County, Gangwon Province, South Korea. It has an elevation of 302 m (991 ft).

== See also ==
- List of mountains in Korea
