= Pig toilet =

Outhouse mounted over a pigsty

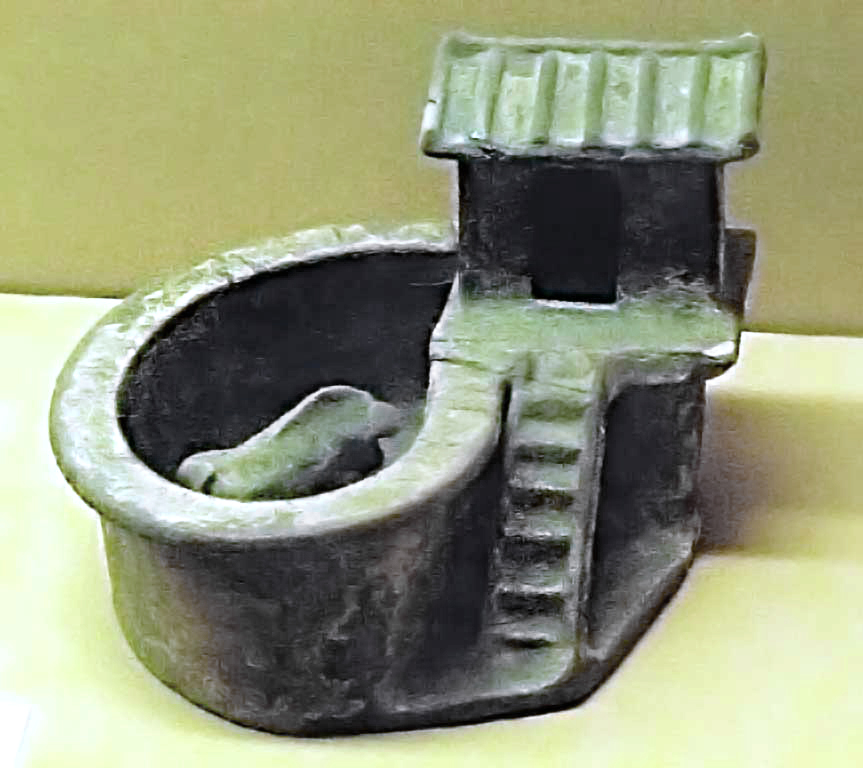
Model of toilet with pigsty (China, Eastern Han dynasty 25–220 AD)

A pig toilet (Chinese: 猪圈茅坑 zhūjuànmáokēng, sometimes called a "pig sty latrine") is a simple type of dry toilet consisting of an outhouse mounted over a pigsty, with a chute or hole connecting the two. The pigs consume the feces of the users of the toilet, as well as other food.

The pigs raised on human excrement are subsequently used as a food source, which can raise health concerns.

== History ==
Pig toilets were once common in rural China, where a single Chinese character (Chinese: 圂; pinyin: hùn) signifies both "pigsty" and "privy". Funerary models of pig toilets from the Han dynasty (206 BC to AD 220) prove that it was an ancient custom. These arrangements have been strongly discouraged by the Chinese authorities in recent years, although as late as 2005 they could still be found in remote northern provinces.

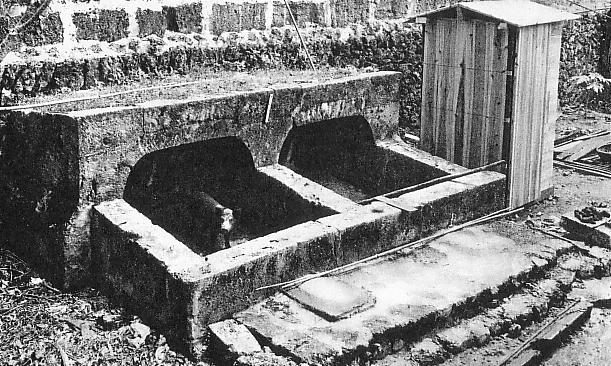
A fuuru (pig toilet) in early 20th-century Okinawa

Chinese influence may have spread the use of pig toilets to Okinawa (Okinawan: ふーる (fūru) / 風呂) before World War II, and also to the Manchu people during the Qing dynasty period.

Pig toilets were also used in parts of India such as Goa. A 2005 survey of sanitary arrangements in Goa and Kerala found that 22.7% of the population still used pig toilets. More recent surveys show significant decline in unsanitary latrine usage, with only 2% of Kerala still using non-flushing toilets, and unsanitary pig rearing being broadly banned in Goa.

On Jejudo, a volcanic island of South Korea that is home to a breed of black pig, the pig toilets were known as dottongsi (Korean: 돗통시). These pigsty toilets were still in use in the 1960s.

=== Fishpond toilet ===
In China, "Family dwellings are commonly built close to the fish pond with toilets overhanging the pond to facilitate fertilization. ... Some pigsties as well as latrines for humans are built on the adjacent dike so as to overhang the pond." By 1988, these fish pond toilets were falling out of favour, as the farmers found it more useful to ferment human and pig excrement together, and apply it to the aquaculture ponds as needed.

In Vietnam, the traditional fish pond toilet, which was described as "widespread" as recently as 2008, polluted the waterways, but was perceived as more hygienic (less odorous) than various modern alternatives that the government was pressing on the villagers.

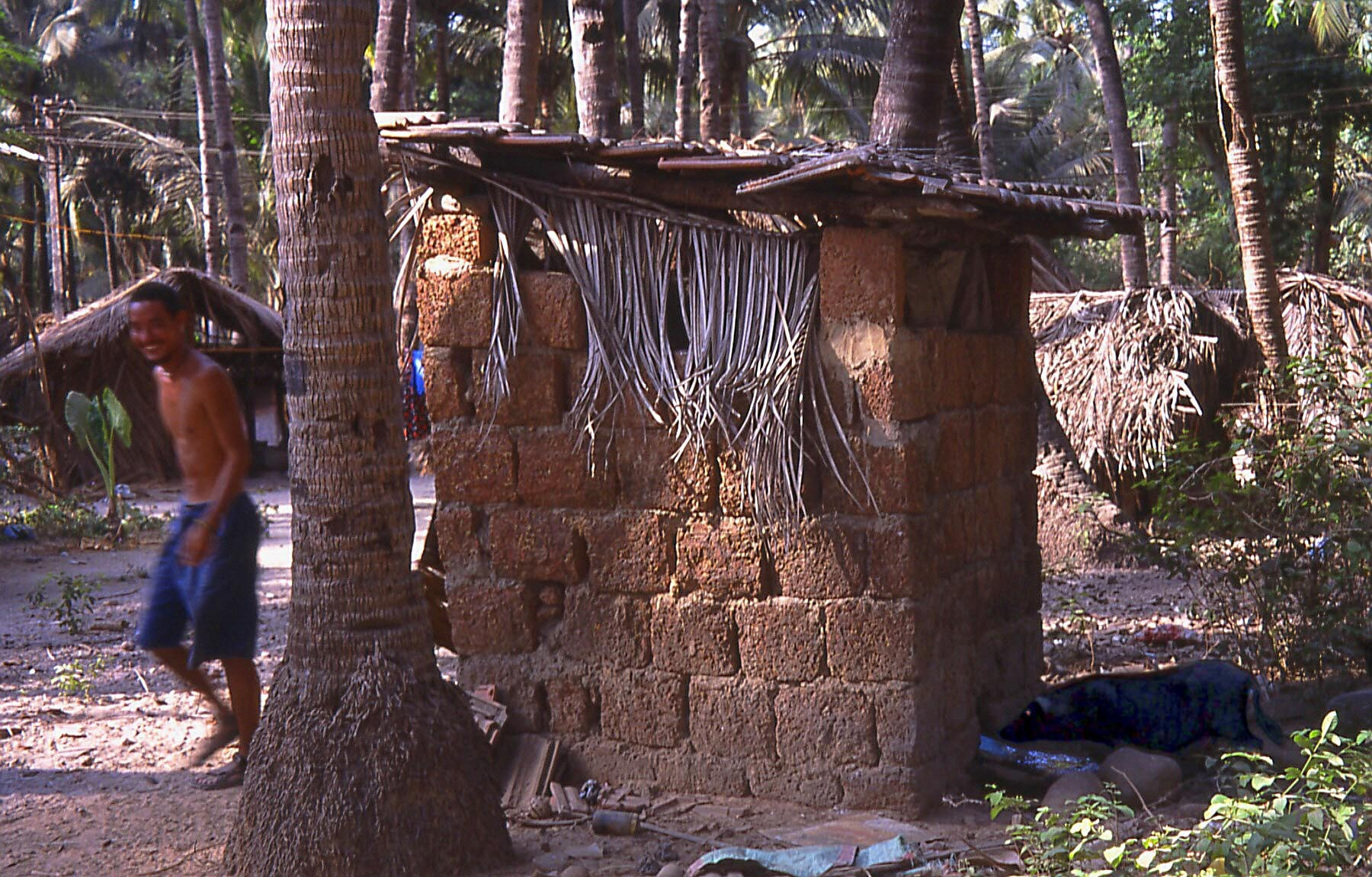
Pig toilet in Goa, India (1999)

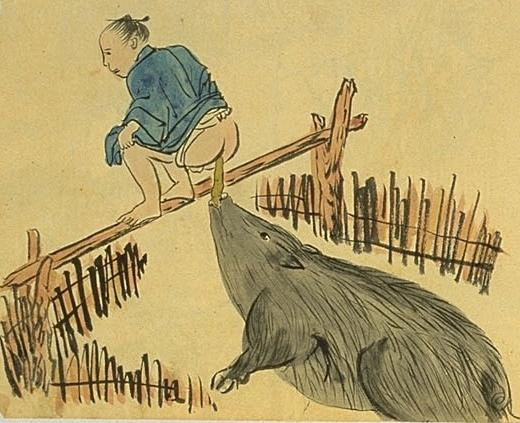
Pig toilet in Ryukyu (1800s)

== See also ==
- Coprophagia
- History of water supply and sanitation
- Toilet god
