= Hongcheon River =

River in South Korea

- Hangul: 홍천강
- Hanja: 洪川江
- RR: Hongcheongang
- MR: Hongch'ŏn'gang

The Hongcheon (Korean: 홍천강) is a river of South Korea. It is a tributary of the Bukhan River in the Han River system. The principal city is Hongcheon.

With warm waters and tourist attractions, the river is a popular vacationing spot.
