= Eungbongsan (Nae-myeon, Hongcheon) =

Mountain in Hongcheon, South Korea

Highest point
- Elevation: 1,103.3 m (3,620 ft)

Geography
- Location: South Korea

Korean name
- Hangul: 응봉산
- Hanja: 應峰山
- RR: Eungbongsan
- MR: Ŭngbongsan

Eungbongsan (Korean: 응봉산) is a mountain in Hongcheon county, Gangwon Province, in South Korea. It has an elevation of 1,103.3 m (3,620 ft).

== See also ==
- List of mountains in Korea
