= Chinese Black and White =

Chinese breed of cattle

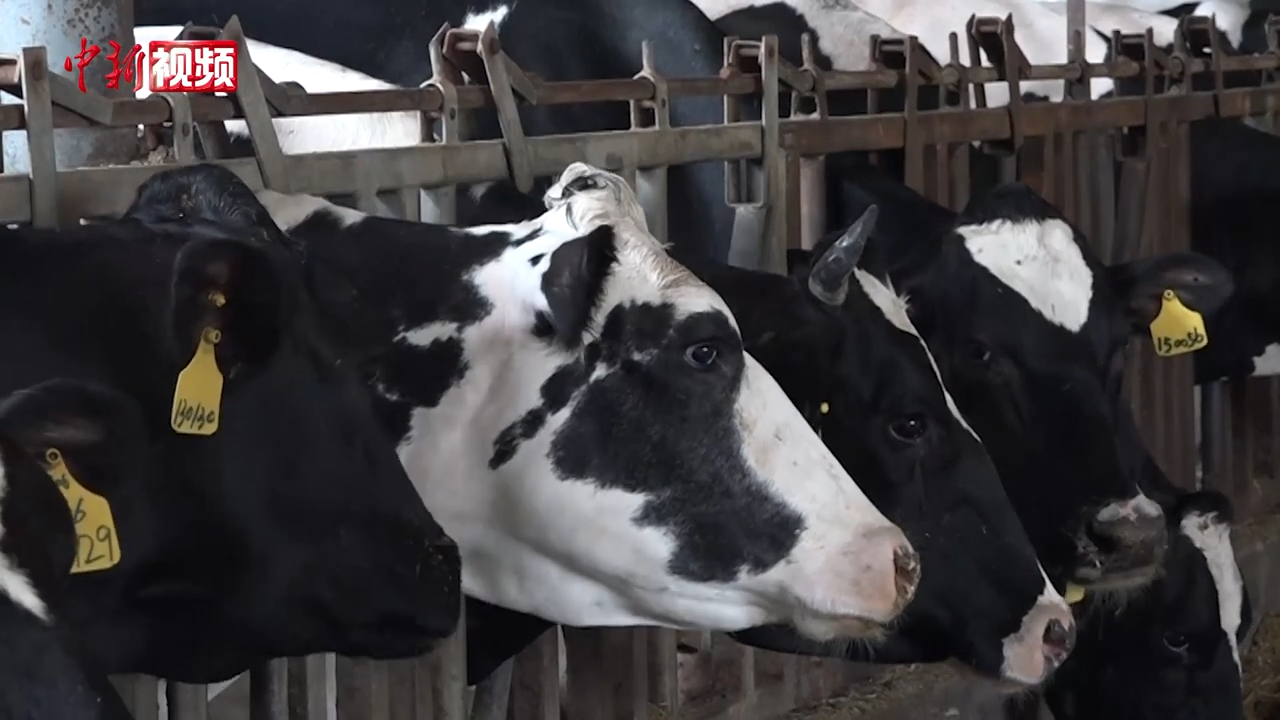
- Conservation status: FAO (2007): not at risk; DAD-IS (2025): unknown
- Other names: Chinese Black Pied; Chinese Black-and-White; Chinese Black-White
- Country of origin: China
- Distribution: nation-wide
- Use: dairy

Traits
- Weight: Male: 1142 kg; Female: 615 kg
- Height: Male: 157 cm; Female: 136 cm
- Coat: pied, black-and-white

The Chinese Holstein, formerly known as Chinese Black and White or Chinese Black Pied is a Chinese breed of dairy cattle. It derives from cross-breeding with local cows of black-and-white dairy cattle of various breeds imported since the 1870s from Canada, Germany, Japan, the Netherlands, the United Kingdom and the United States. It is the most numerous dairy breed in China and is distributed throughout the country.

== History ==
Black-and-white dairy cattle were imported to major cities in China in the 1870s from Canada, Germany, Japan, the UK and the USA. After the Second World War large American Holstein-Friesians were imported, as was smaller Dutch Black Pied stock from the Netherlands. These at first gave rise to larger and smaller types within the Chinese breed, but these can no longer be distinguished. A supervisory body, the Coordinating Group of Breeding Chinese Black and White Dairy Cattle, was set up in 1979 by the Ministry of Agriculture, and a herd-book was established in 1983; this records all pedigree cattle. In 1983 there were approximately 572500 head; in 2011 it was estimated that about 80% of all dairy cattle in China – or 11.5 million of a total of about 14.4 million – were of this breed.

In 1985, the breed was approved and named as "the black and white dairy cattle of China", which name was used in the national standard GB/T 3157-82.They were renamed "Chinese Holstein" in 1992.

== Use ==
In 1982 the average milk yield of 270000 cows was found to be 4461 kg (9835 lb) per lactation of 305 days. The highest recorded individual yield in one lactation was 16090 kg in 305 days, and the lifetime record was 100897 kg in 10 lactations totalling 3721 days.

The milk averages 3.3% fat in the southern part of the country, and 3.4% in the north.
