= Eungbongsan (Yeongwol) =

Mountain in South Korea

Highest point
- Elevation: 1,013 m (3,323 ft)

Geography
- Location: South Korea

Korean name
- Hangul: 응봉산
- Hanja: 鷹峰山
- RR: Eungbongsan
- MR: Ŭngbongsan

Eungbongsan (Korean: 응봉산) is a mountain in Yeongwol County, Gangwon Province, South Korea. It has an elevation of 1,013 m (3,323 ft).

== See also ==
- List of mountains in Korea
