= Jeju Black =

Korean breed of cattle

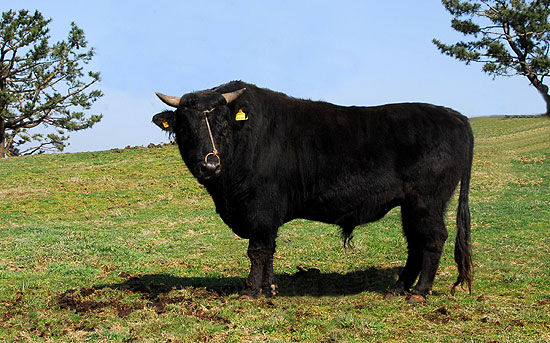
- A breeding bull
- Conservation status: FAO (2007): not at risk; DAD-IS (2024): unknown
- Other names: Korean: 제주흑우; Cheju Hanwoo; Jeju Native; Korean Black; Jeju
- Country of origin: Republic of Korea
- Distribution: Jeju Island
- Use: meat

Traits
- Weight: Male: average: 386 kg; Female: average: 291 kg
- Height: Male: average: 103 cm; Female: average: 101 cm
- Coat: black
- Cattle; Bos (primigenius) taurus

The Jeju Black (Korean: 제주흑우; Hanja: 濟州黑牛) or Cheju Black is a Korean breed of domestic cattle. It is found only on the island of Jeju. It is one of four indigenous cattle breeds in the Republic of Korea, the others being the Hanwoo, the Chikso or Korean Brindle and the Heugu or Korean Black.

== History ==
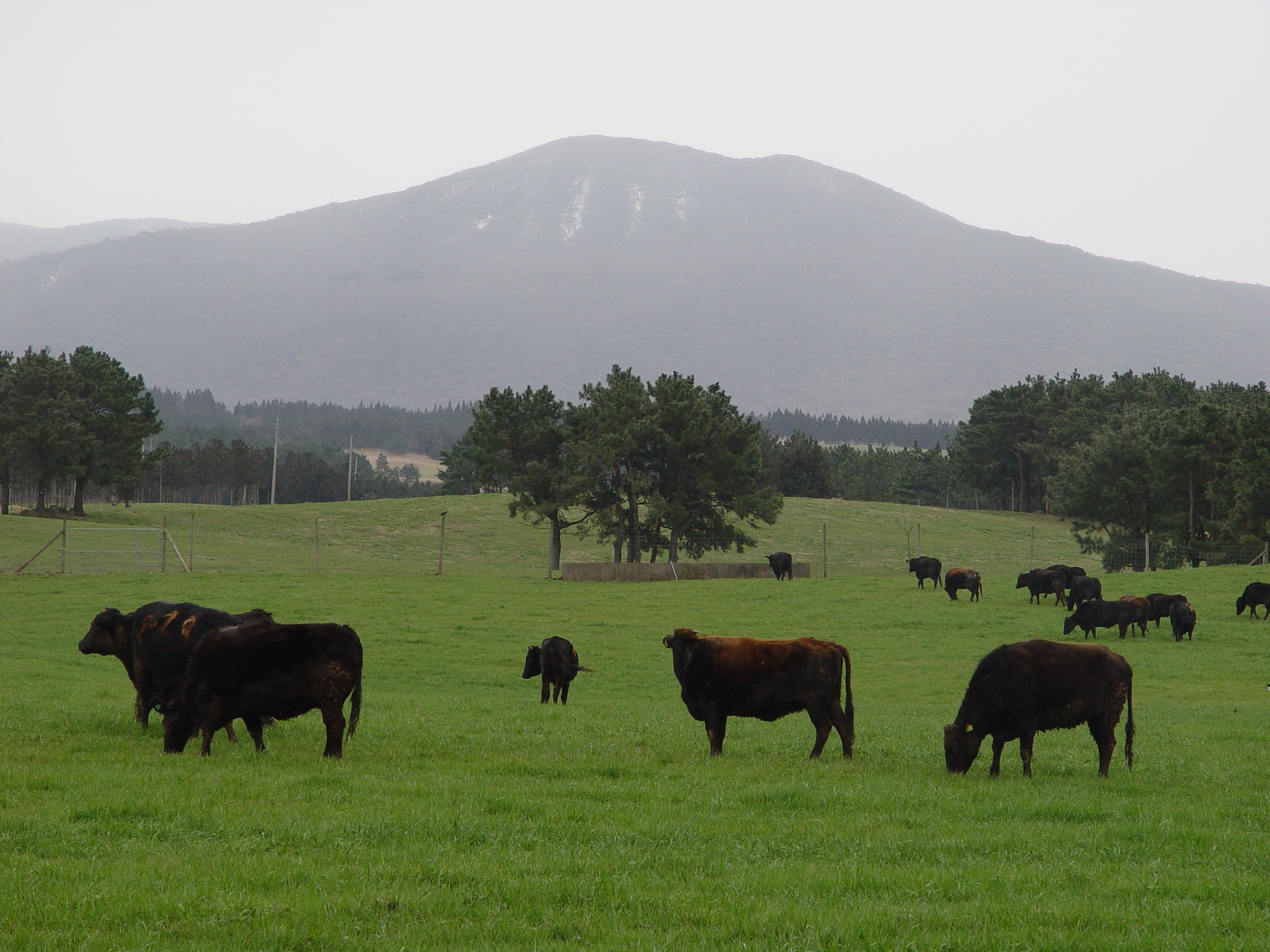
At pasture

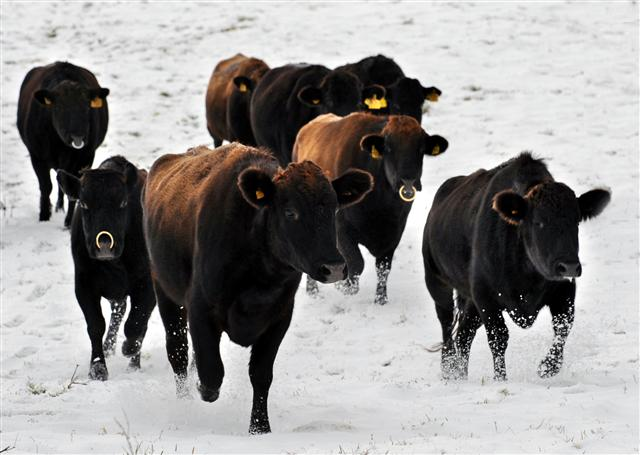
In snow

The first historic painting of Jeju Black Cattle was found on a mural of an ancient tomb named Anak Tomb No. 3 during the Goguryeo Dynasty in 357 AD. There also exist ancient documents, the Annals of the Joseon Dynasty and several others that described the shapes of cattle breeds. History of breeding of Jeju Black Cattle in Jeju Island dated back to 1702 AD, during the 28th year of the reign of King Sukjong. The administrator of Jeju-mok regional office at that period, known as Yi Hyeong-sang, surveyed around whole island, and those records were collected in Tamna Sullyeokdo. According to his report, a total of 703 black cattle were raised at that time in the island. Also, a molecular genetic analysis of ancient cattle bones excavated from the Gonae and Kwakji archaeological sites in Jeju (A.D. 0–900) by researchers at Jeju National University showed that the ancient bones belonged to Bos taurus and formed a monophyletic group with present-day Jeju Black Cattle.

From 1930 a policy of breeding only for yellowish-brown coat colour – the colour of the Hanwoo – was adopted, and only cattle of that colour could be registered. This was intended to limit cross-breeding with cattle imported from abroad, but also had the effect of bringing the three minority breeds – the Jeju Black, the Chikso or Korean Brindle and the Heugu or Korean Black – close to extinction.

Since 1992, scientists in Jeju Stockbreeding Promotion Institute have collected Jeju Black Cattle which were scattered at private farms in Jeju Island and managed as a group of genetic resource. They are also carrying out preservation/proliferation projects. As per their project goals expectations, if successful, over 600 of these black cattle will exist in Jeju area in near future. Jeju SPI also developed a breed discrimination tool using genetic markers. This tool has been applied to retain the uniqueness of the Jeju Black Cattle breed.

In 2013, the South Korean government acknowledged the historical and cultural values of Jeju Black Cattle and assigned it Natural Monument No. 546 of National Cultural Property to prevent extinction and preserve the breed. The Korea Animal Improvement Association, which mainly functions for management of individual identification and pedigree information of seedstock animal owned either by institutions or private breeders, also manages breeding herd information of Jeju Black Cattle in their registration database system, which is open to public.

In 1992 there were over 3500 of the cattle, and in 2007 the conservation status of the breed was listed by the FAO as 'not at risk'. In 2013 the population numbered 170, with 94 breeding cows and 76 bulls; no numbers have been reported since then, and in 2024 the conservation status was 'unknown'.

== Characteristics ==
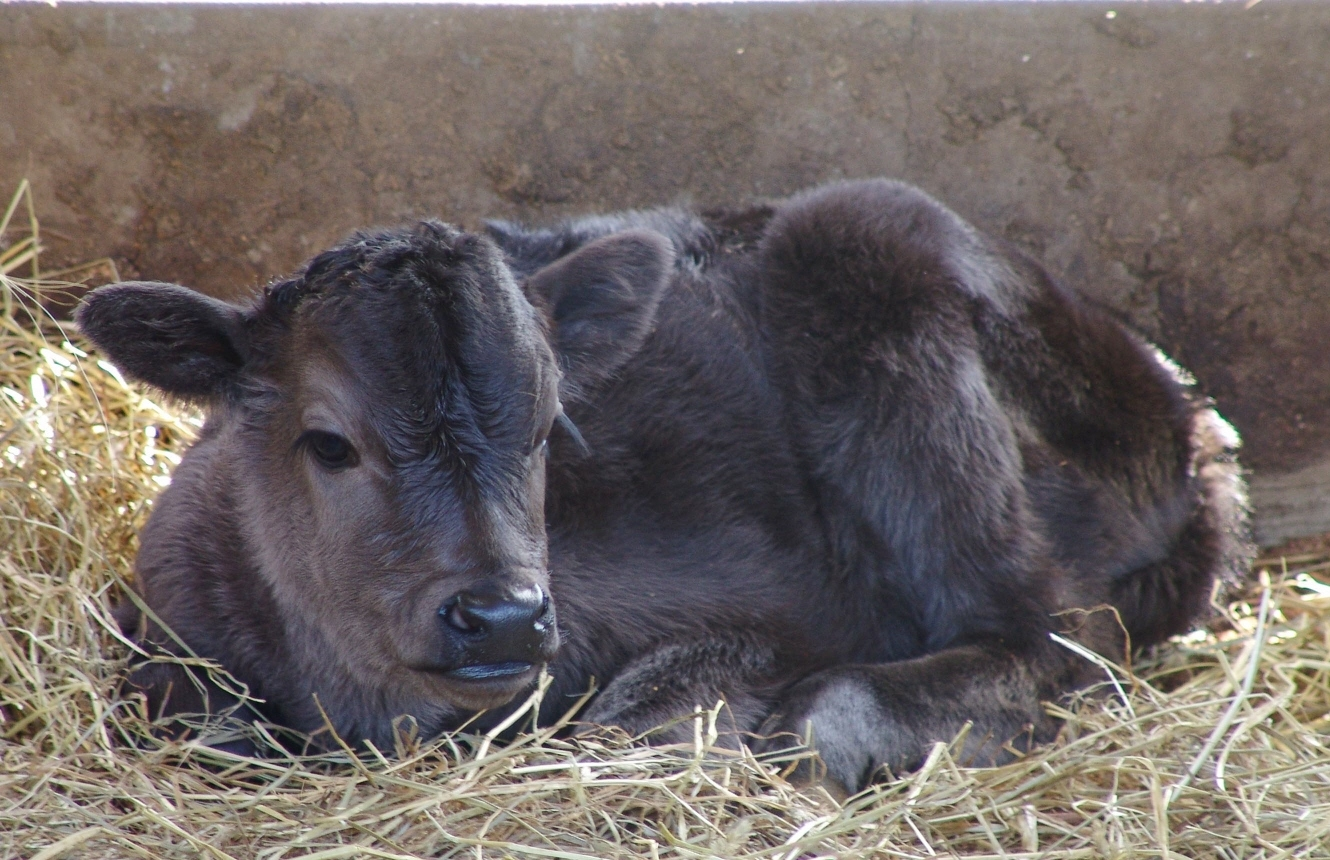
A calf

The average height at the withers is 103 cm for bulls, about 2 cm less for cows; average body weights are 386 kg and 291 kg respectively. The coat is black; there are also yellow cattle on the island.

== Use ==
The cattle were traditionally reared for beef and for draught work.
