= Eungbongsan (Wonju and Yeongwol) =

Mountain in Wonju, South Korea

Highest point
- Elevation: 1,094.9 m (3,592 ft)

Geography
- Location: South Korea

Korean name
- Hangul: 응봉산
- Hanja: 應峰山
- RR: Eungbongsan
- MR: Ŭngbongsan

Eungbongsan (Korean: 응봉산) is a mountain in Wonju, Gangwon Province, South Korea. It has an elevation of 1,094.9 m (3,592 ft).

== See also ==
- Chiaksan National Park
- List of mountains in Korea
