= Eungbongsan (South Gyeongsang) =

Mountain in South Korea

Highest point
- Elevation: 473 m (1,552 ft)

Geography
- Location: South Gyeongsang Province, South Korea

Korean name
- Hangul: 응봉산
- Hanja: 鷹峰山
- RR: Eungbongsan
- MR: Ŭngbongsan

Eungbongsan (Korean: 응봉산) is a mountain of South Gyeongsang Province, southeastern South Korea. It has an elevation of 473 metres (1,552 feet).

== See also ==
- List of mountains of Korea
