= Hanwoo =

Korean cattle breed

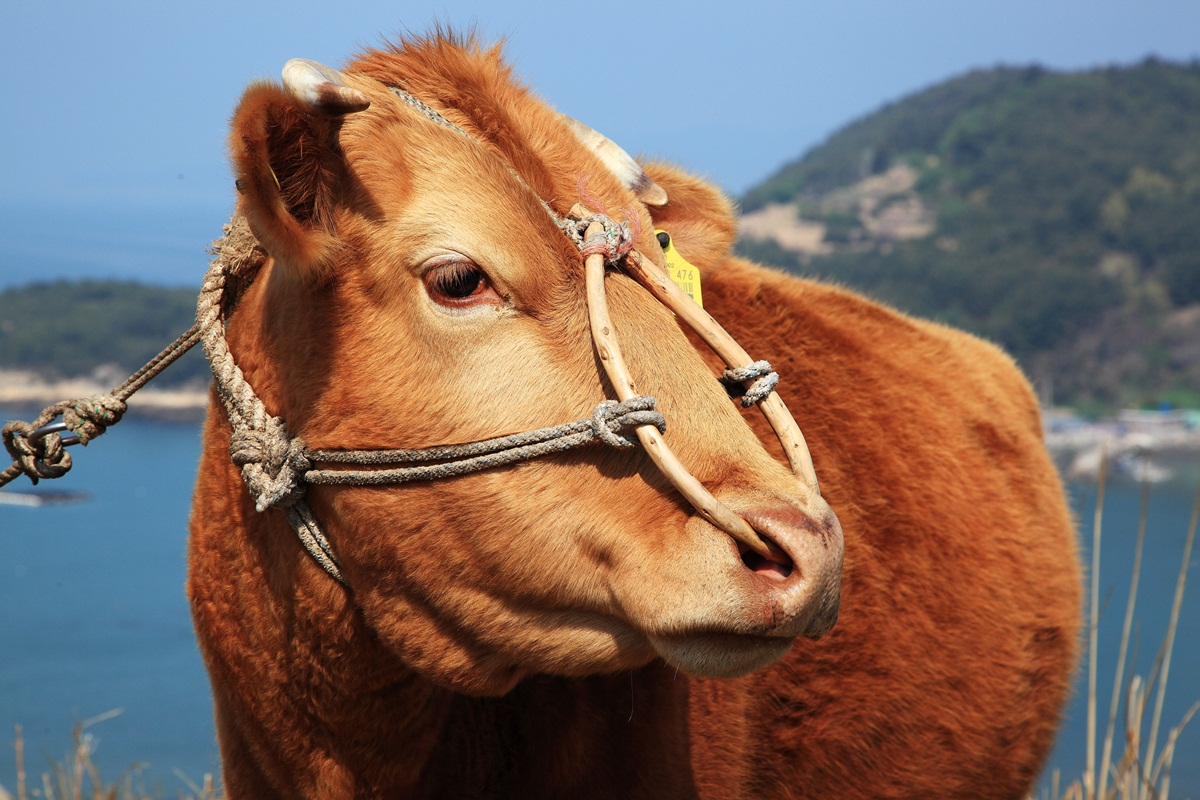
- Conservation status: FAO (2007): not at risk
- Other names: Hanu; Korean Brown; Korean Native
- Country of origin: Korea
- Use: meat

Traits
- Weight: Male: 466 kg; Female: 355 kg
- Height: Male: 124 cm; Female: 117 cm
- Coat: brown
- Horn status: horned in both sexes

Notes
- Bos taurus

- Hanwoo
- Hangul: 한우
- Hanja: 韓牛
- RR: Hanu
- MR: Hanu

The Hanwoo (Korean: 한우), also Hanu or Korean Native, is a breed of small cattle native to Korea. It was formerly used as a working animal, but is now raised mainly for meat. It is one of four indigenous Korean breeds, the others being the Chikso, the Heugu and the Jeju Black.

== History ==
=== Origin ===
No clear consensus has been established on the origins of native Korean cattle breeds. However, Hanwoo belongs to northern (Bos taurus) lineage without zebu/Bos indicus lineage. They share a common origin with the Japanese Black and Yanbian cattle, though geographical selection and selective breeding for different purposes over millennia have led to genetic divergence.

=== Early history ===
Korean cattle were selectively bred for more than 5,000 years. They were originally bred as working animals for transportation and agriculture. Their small bodies and well-developed forelimbs were suited for Korea's mountainous terrain. They were sometimes sacrificed in religious ceremonies.

In the late 16th and early 17th centuries, Joseon-era Korea faced multiple invasions in the Imjin and Chŏngyu Wars, the 1627 Jin invasion, and the 1636 Qing invasion. The displacement of livestock during the invasions may have introduced diseases such as rinderpest from Manchuria, against which Korean cattle had little resistance. An outbreak of rinderpest began in October 1627, possibly transmitted by the livestock of the invading Jin army.

A more severe outbreak began in 1636 in Pyongan Province, spreading throughout Joseon. Fatalities from the outbreak were widespread; Pyongan Province reported that not a single cow had survived, and chroniclers recorded that in many villages only a few breeding stock were left. In response to the outbreak, the royal court of King Injo decreed that the slaughter of cattle was strictly prohibited in Joseon. Cattle from Jeju Island were imported, but by the winter of 1637 the outbreak had spread there, killing roughly half of its 21,000 cattle. The Joseon court then sought to import Japanese cattle from Tsushima Island, but these plans were halted when a devastating rinderpest outbreak began in Japan's Kansai region. The Joseon court ultimately sent a delegation to Mongolia in 1638, which was by then rinderpest-free, to negotiate the purchase of cattle. The delegation returned with 185 heads of cattle, and breeding programs allowed the cattle population in Korea to recover.

The last outbreak of rinderpest in Korea was recorded in 1931, and the disease was declared globally eradicated in 2011.

=== Post-war history ===
In the 1940s, the population of Hanwoo cattle again collapsed from 1,740,000 in 1940 to 393,000 by 1950.

A herd book was established in 1968. Hanwoo beef has since become a premium product.

The Hanwoo was listed by the FAO as "not at risk" in 2007. In 2003, the total population was reported to be about 1 240 000; in 2014, it was reported as 2 670 000.

In 2001, the Hanwoo was suggested to be a hybrid between taurine and indicine cattle. A mitochondrial DNA study in 2010 found it to be closely related to two taurine breeds, the Holstein and the Japanese Black, and distinctly different from the indicine Nelore and Zwergzebu.

== Characteristics ==
The Hanwoo is a small breed. The coat is brown; both sexes are horned. Cows have good maternal qualities, but milk production is low, with little more than 400 L produced in 170 days. The cattle are fed rice straw as their principal source of roughage. A rare white variant of the Hanwoo has been bred since 2009; in 2014 there were 14 head. It is reported to DAD-IS as a separate breed.

== Use ==
Despite its high price, Hanwoo beef is preferred in Korean cuisine, as it is typically fresher and of better quality than cheaper imported substitutes. One 2001 journal article wrote "Hanwoo is regarded as a premium beef because of its high palatability and desired chewiness". Since Koreans consider Hanwoo beef a cultural icon, it is used in traditional foods, popular holiday dishes, or as a special-day gift. Hoengseong County is best known for its Hanwoo cattle, where the environment is well-suited for cattle farming. The county began a marketing campaign to brand itself as the origin of the highest quality beef in Korea, selling meat as a "premium product".

== Gallery ==
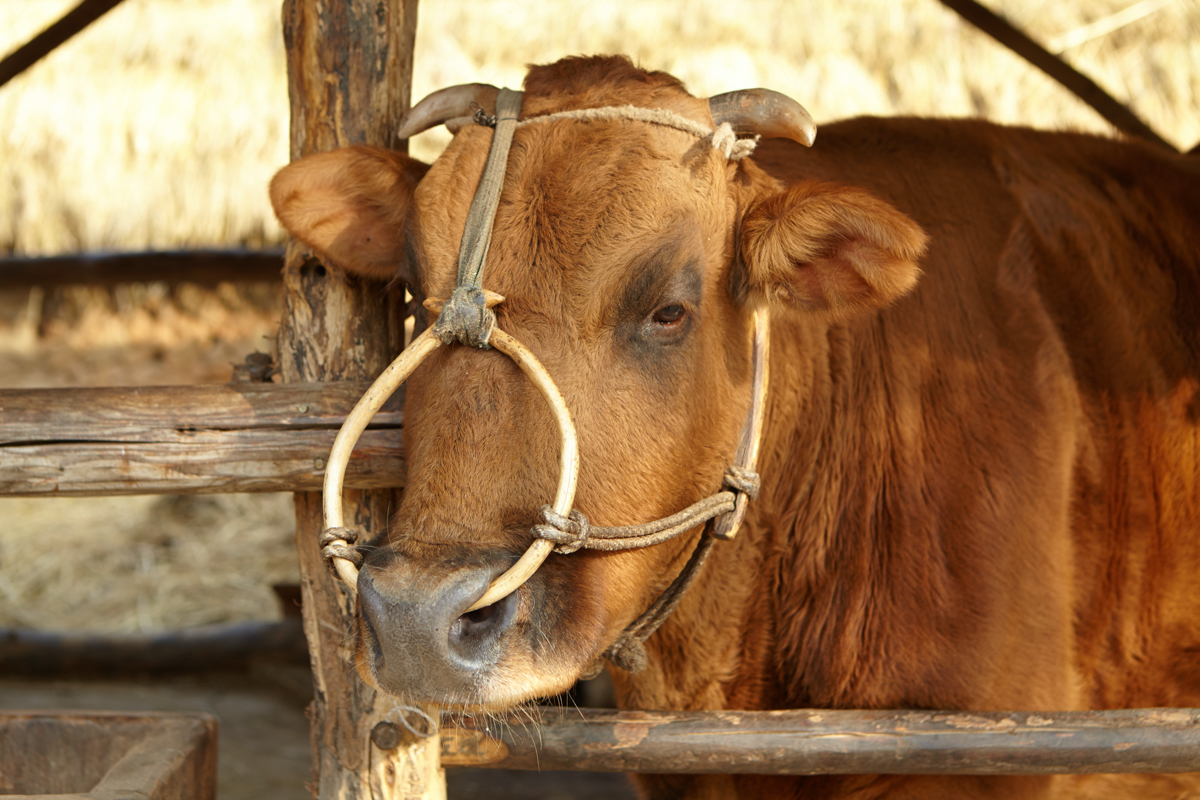
A cow, in 2011

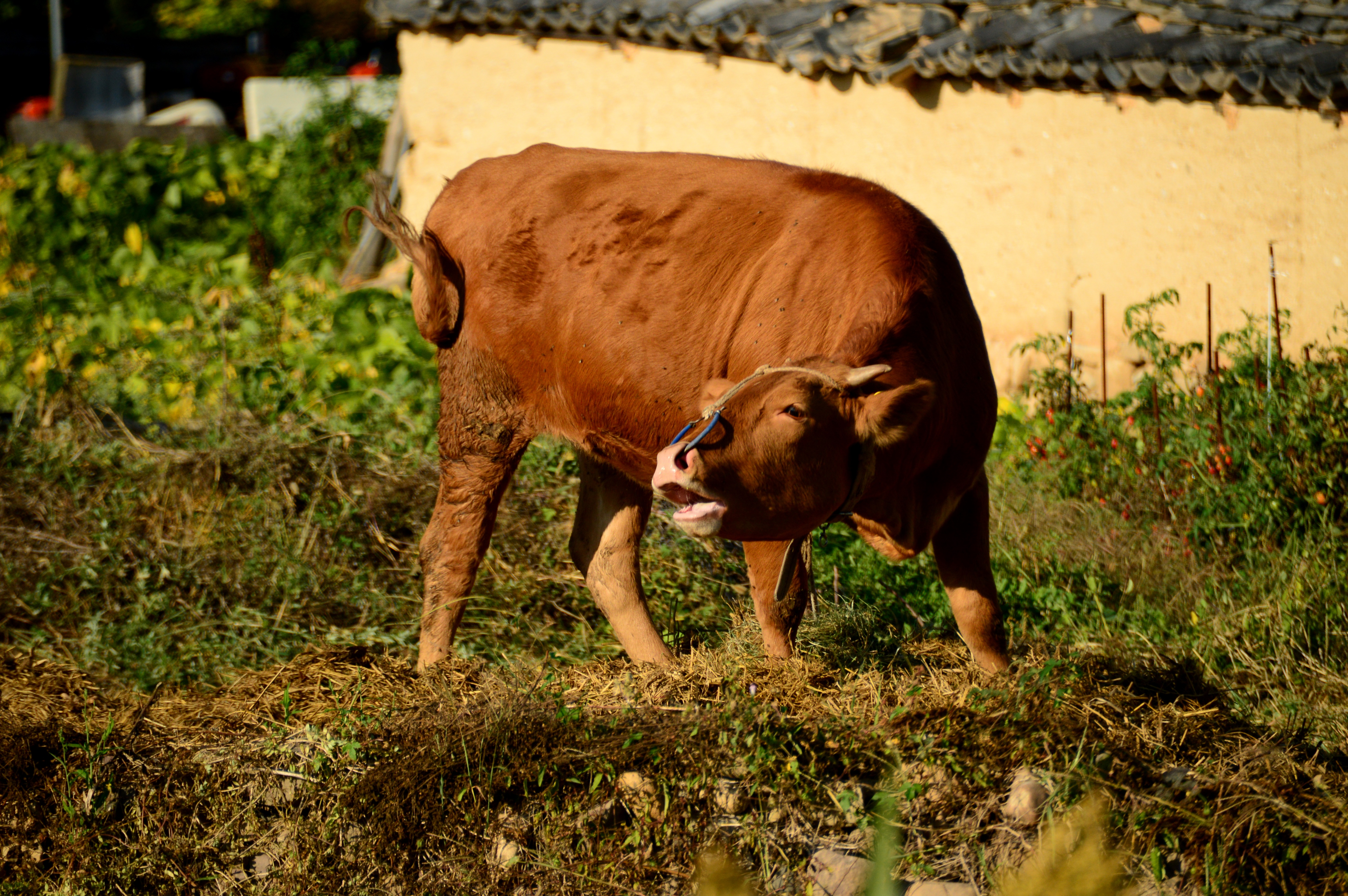
Lowing

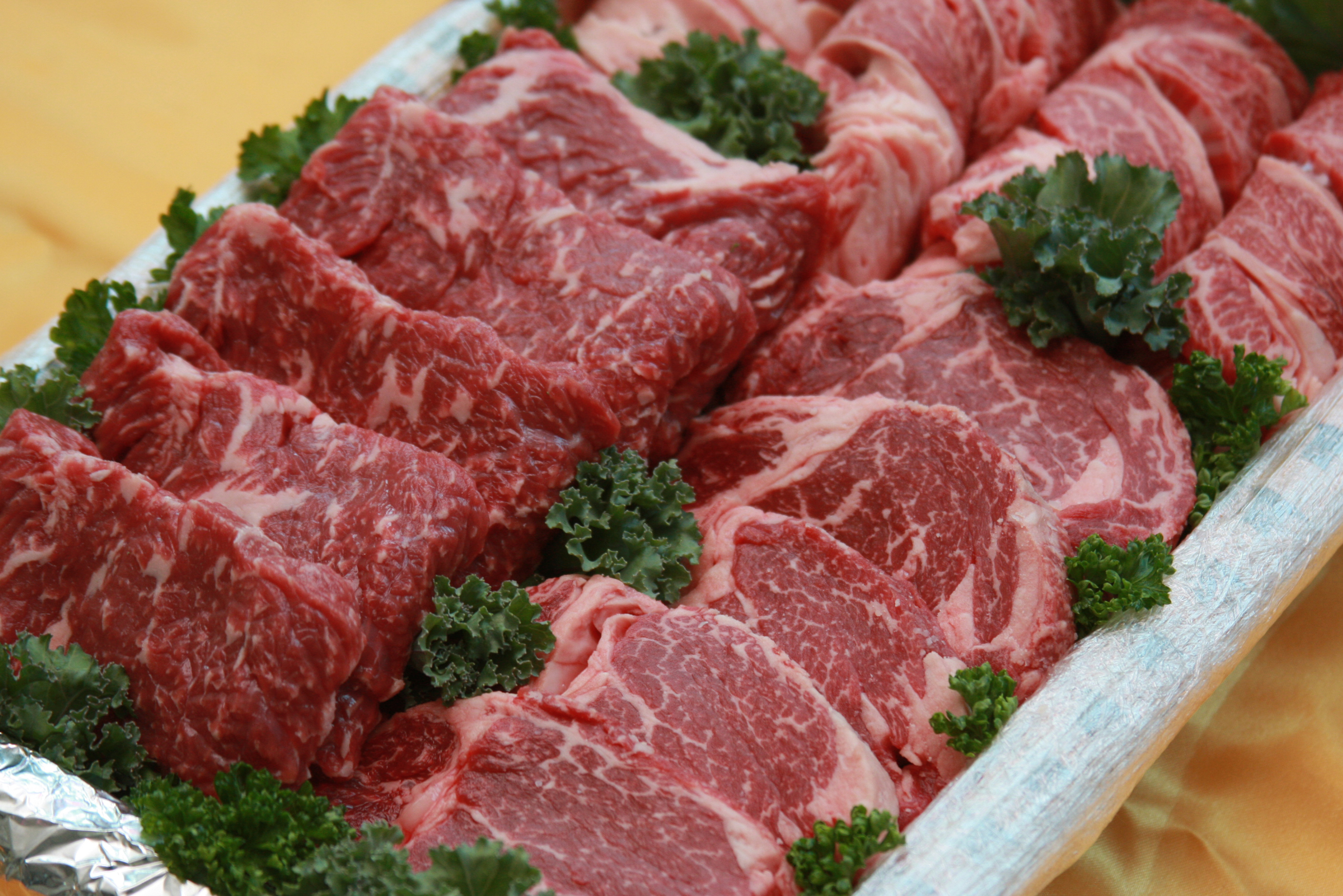
Marbled hanu beef (한우소고기)
