= Korean Native pig =

Breed of pig

Korean Native
- Country of origin: Korea

Traits
- Hair: black

Notes
- long nose, erect ears

The Korean Native pig is a breed of domestic pig indigenous to Korea. The meat is preferred to that of imported breeds and is of a darker red colour.

== Characteristics ==
The Korean Native pig was reported to have glossy black hair, a dished face, a greatly protruded mouth, big eyes, straightly upright ears, round shoulders, a narrow rear back, a wide chest, long hips, well-balanced short legs and 10–12 teats (Taimatsu, 1917). Its major characteristics are high-propagating power, superior meat quality and strong adaption ability. (Yeo et al. 2000). Its growth rate and feed conversion ratio are lower than in imported breeds, but it yields meat of higher quality and adapts better to extensive management.
