= Eungbongsan (Gangwon and North Gyeongsang) =

Mountain in South Korea

Highest point
- Elevation: 999 m (3,278 ft)
- Coordinates: 37°04′35″N 129°13′51″E

Geography
- Location: South Korea

Korean name
- Hangul: 응봉산
- Hanja: 應峰山
- RR: Eungbongsan
- MR: Ŭngbongsan

Eungbongsan (Korean: 응봉산) is a mountain that sits on the border Samcheok, Gangwon Province and Uljin County, North Gyeongsang Province, in South Korea. It has an elevation of 999 m (3,278 ft).

== See also ==
- List of mountains in Korea
