= Yanbian cattle =

Chinese breed of cattle

Yanbian Cattle
- Country of origin: China
- Distribution: China
- Use: Draught

Traits
- Weight: Male: 465kg; Female: 365kg
- Height: Male: 131cm; Female: 122cm
- Coat: Yellow
- Horn status: Horned

The Yanbian is a taurine breed of cattle that originated in northeast China. They belong to the "yellow" class of Chinese cattle, and are closely related to the Korean Hanwoo breed, having diverged from a common ancestor in the late 19th/early 20th century. Unlike the majority of Chinese cattle breeds, Yanbian has had no ancestral breeding with indicine cattle. They are mainly distributed in northeastern China, in the Jilin, Heilongjiang and Liaoning Provinces. In 2010, it was estimated there were 210,000 individuals.

Females are 122 cm tall at the withers, 141 cm in length and weigh 365 kg on average; males are 131 cm tall at the withers, 152 cm in length and weigh 465 kg on average. Their coat colour is predominantly yellow, and both males and females are horned.

They are primarily used as draught animals, particularly in rice production. They are also increasingly being raised for beef, with a dressing percentage of 40-48%. However, they have a slow growth rate, so production potential is limited. Yanbians were crossed with Limousins in 1987 to produce the Yan Yellow breed, which has improved beef production qualities.
