= Hongcheon County =

Coordinates: 37°41′33″N 127°52′48″E

Hongcheon
- County
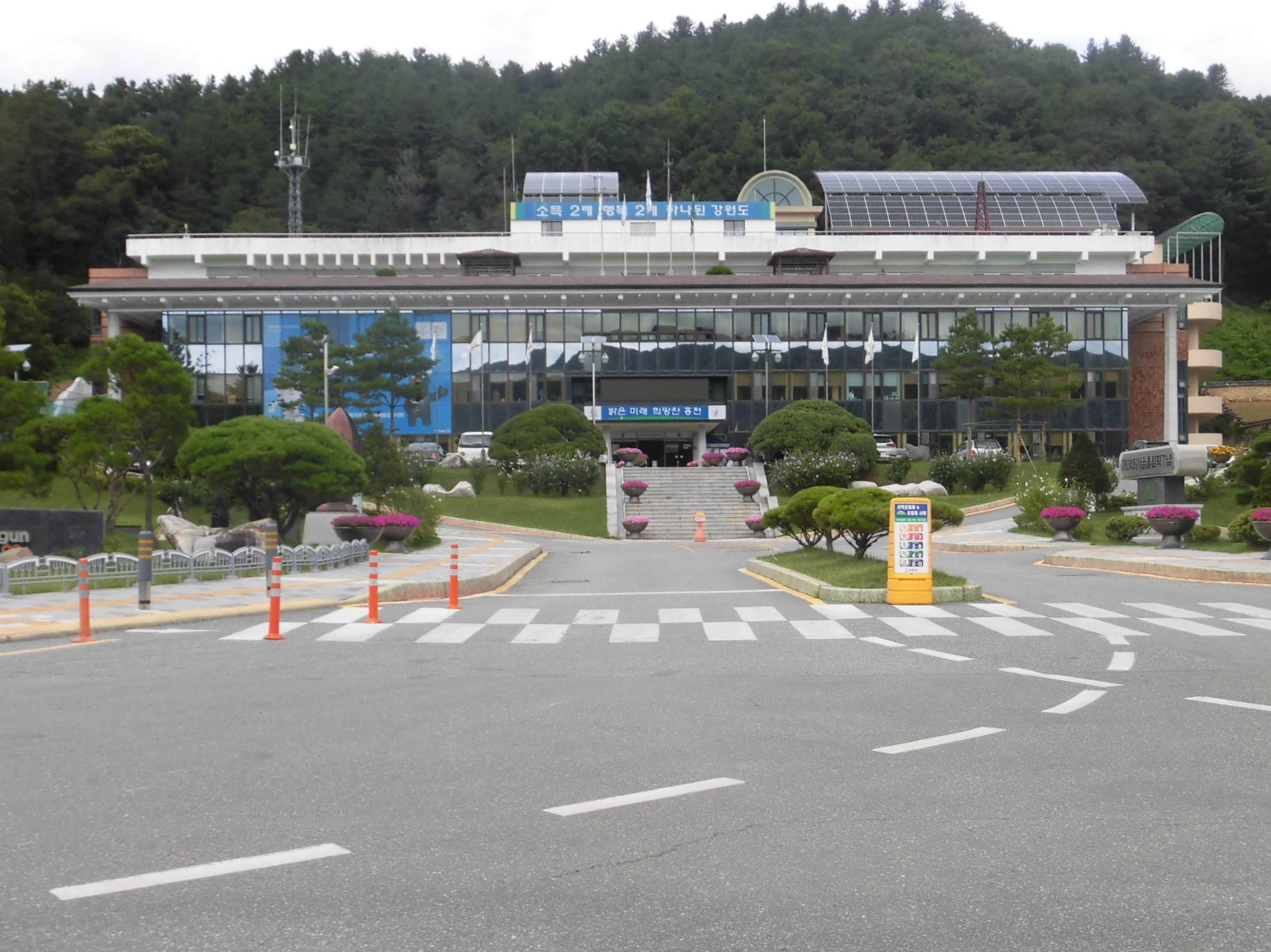
- Panoramic view of Hongcheon-eup Hongcheon County Office

- Flag Emblem of Hongcheon

- Location in South Korea
- Country: South Korea
- State: Gangwon
- Administrative divisions: 1 eup, 9 myeon

Area
  - Total: 1,817.9 km^{2} (701.9 sq mi)

Population (September 2024)
  - Total: 67,067

Korean name
- Hangul: 홍천군
- Hanja: 洪川郡
- RR: Hongcheon-gun
- MR: Hongch'ŏn-gun

Hongcheon County (Korean: 홍천군) is a county and city in the state of Gangwon, South Korea. The city lies on the northern bank of the Hongcheon River, southeast of Chuncheon. The terrain of the county is mainly mountainous and contains hot springs in the Hongcheong River valley. The county produces ginseng, maize, and vegetables. As of 2012 the county had a population of 70,401 people (including foreigners) in 29,894 households.

== History ==
Hongcheon's historic name was BulRyeokChunHyeon during the rule of Goguryeo. King Gyeongduk of Silla changed the name to YoungHyeon of Sak-Ju, In 1043, it was named Hongcheon during the reign of King In-Jong. Following the independence of the country on 15 August 1945, many administrative changes were made, affecting the jurisdiction of various units under its control.

Korean Federation for Environmental Movement (KFEM) opened an educational facility in Hongcheon in 1995.

Hongcheon County uses an emblem to represent itself as the "County of Culture and Tourism." The emblem, a simple depiction of a leaf and dew, symbolizes a clean environment, patriotism, and love of one's hometown.

== Geography ==
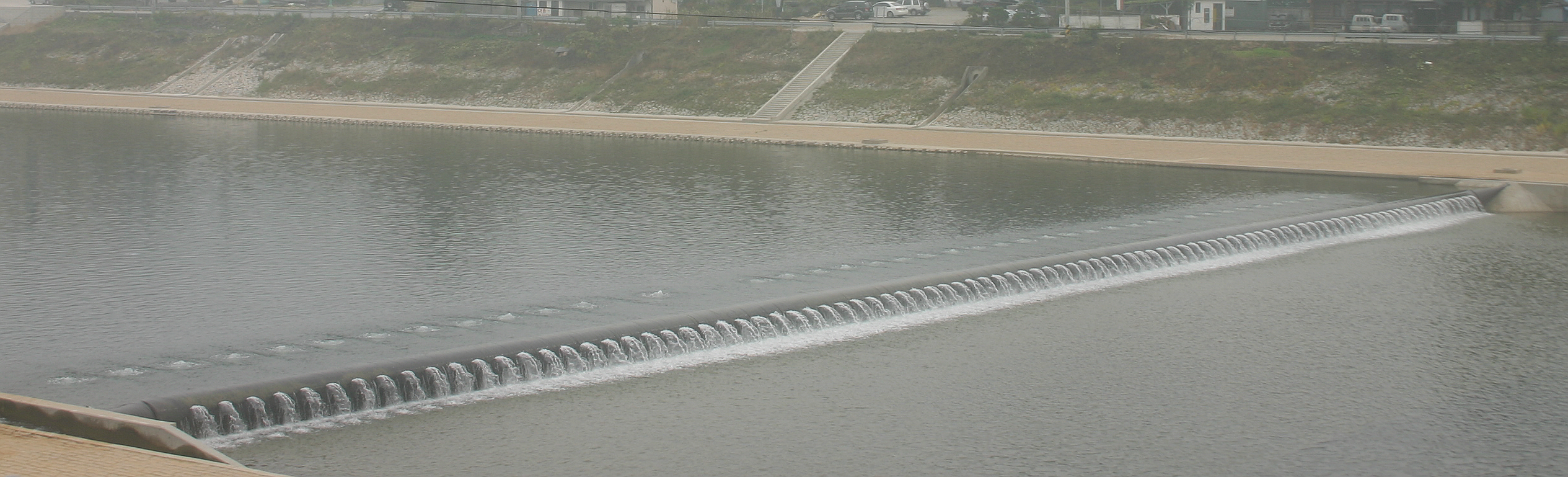
The Hongcheon dam on the Hongcheon River.

Hongcheon is located in Gangwon Province. The county, located in the middle of the peninsula, is the largest in Korea with an area of about 1,818 square kilometres (702 sq mi) and is reported to be three times the size of Seoul. It is bounded by Chuncheon city on the north, the Inje County and Yangyang County to the northeast, by Gapyeong County of Gyeonggi Province to the west, by Hoengseong and Pyeongchang counties to the south. The county is a middle-level mountainous region, an offshoot of the Baegdu mountain range. The eastern end of the mountain range, where Myeonggae village and Nae township are located, runs in an east–west direction for a length of 93.1 km (57.8 mi) The western part of the mountain range which has Dongmak village and Seotown extends over a length of 39.4 km (24.5 mi) in an east–west direction. While the southern part of the hill range covers the Sidong village and the Nam town, the northern part has Jangnam village and Duchon township. The Palbong Mountain (327.4 m) has scenic views of the course of the Hongcheon River; the river forms white sandy banks. The Hongcheon river system which rises the Taebaek mountain watershed, joins the Hongcheon River which forms a small plain area at Seorak-myeon, Gapyeong-gun, Gyeonggi-do. It then flows in to the Cheongpyeong Dam in Gyeonggi Province. Gachilbong Sambong Spring is located in Gwangwon-ri, Nae-myeon and originates from the Palbong Mountain; Garyeong Waterfall is located in Waya-ri, Naechon-myeon at the foot of Mt. Baekam (1,099m) which drops through rapids over a height of 50 m. The area is known for medicinal herbs, wild flowers and mountain birds.

The bus terminal provides connections with Gimpo and Incheon airports. A bus ride from Dong Seoul Bus Terminal to Hongcheon is approximately one hour. Naerincheon, a small river, crosses Hongcheon and is the only one in the country which flows north. Nearby is the Daemyung Vivaldi Park Ski World, a ski resort (with 13 ski runs, each with a music theme) and water park called OceanWorld in the mountains. Local football club Hongcheon Idu FC play their games at Hongcheon Public Park.

One of the attractions of Hongcheon is Alpaca World. Located in the forest of Pungcheon-ri, Hwachon-myeon, Hongcheon-gun, this place is designed to provide communication and experience with animals. It is popular with people because they can meet various animals as well as alpacas.

== Climate ==
The climate of Hongcheon County is a humid continental climate (Köppen: Dwa). Climatic conditions are considered extreme as its location is away from the sea. The minimum temperature recorded is –28.1 °C in January. The climatic data is given in the table below. On 1 August 2018, Hongcheon County recorded a temperature of 41.0 °C (105.8 °F), which is the highest temperature to have ever been recorded in South Korea.

Climate data for Hongcheon (1991–2020 normals, extremes 1971–present)
Month	Jan	Feb	Mar	Apr	May	Jun	Jul	Aug	Sep	Oct	Nov	Dec	Year
Record high °C (°F)	14.1 (57.4)	20.1 (68.2)	23.9 (75.0)	32.5 (90.5)	35.0 (95.0)	36.2 (97.2)	38.5 (101.3)	41.0 (105.8)	34.5 (94.1)	29.1 (84.4)	25.6 (78.1)	16.7 (62.1)	41.0 (105.8)
Mean daily maximum °C (°F)	2.1 (35.8)	5.4 (41.7)	11.7 (53.1)	19.1 (66.4)	24.5 (76.1)	28.4 (83.1)	29.8 (85.6)	30.4 (86.7)	26.0 (78.8)	20.0 (68.0)	11.5 (52.7)	3.7 (38.7)	17.7 (63.9)
Daily mean °C (°F)	−4.8 (23.4)	−1.7 (28.9)	4.4 (39.9)	11.2 (52.2)	16.9 (62.4)	21.6 (70.9)	24.5 (76.1)	24.7 (76.5)	19.2 (66.6)	12.0 (53.6)	4.6 (40.3)	−2.6 (27.3)	10.8 (51.4)
Mean daily minimum °C (°F)	−10.5 (13.1)	−7.7 (18.1)	−2.0 (28.4)	3.8 (38.8)	10.0 (50.0)	16.0 (60.8)	20.5 (68.9)	20.6 (69.1)	14.5 (58.1)	6.6 (43.9)	−0.6 (30.9)	−7.6 (18.3)	5.3 (41.5)
Record low °C (°F)	−28.1 (−18.6)	−24.8 (−12.6)	−16.8 (1.8)	−8.0 (17.6)	0.2 (32.4)	4.7 (40.5)	9.9 (49.8)	8.5 (47.3)	0.4 (32.7)	−6.4 (20.5)	−14.7 (5.5)	−22.8 (−9.0)	−28.1 (−18.6)
Average precipitation mm (inches)	15.8 (0.62)	26.2 (1.03)	36.7 (1.44)	74.8 (2.94)	101.3 (3.99)	124.9 (4.92)	395.7 (15.58)	312.5 (12.30)	141.3 (5.56)	49.7 (1.96)	40.9 (1.61)	19.1 (0.75)	1,338.9 (52.71)
Average precipitation days (≥ 0.1 mm)	5.2	5.6	7.4	8.1	8.3	9.5	15.2	14.4	8.5	5.5	7.3	6.5	101.5
Average snowy days	7.4	5.7	3.6	0.4	0.0	0.0	0.0	0.0	0.0	0.1	2.1	5.7	24.7
Average relative humidity (%)	65.8	61.9	58.0	55.5	60.8	66.0	76.0	75.9	74.5	72.0	69.1	68.1	67.0
Mean monthly sunshine hours	163.8	169.9	196.8	209.2	228.9	205.8	150.6	168.0	170.4	175.9	144.7	150.0	2,134
Percentage possible sunshine	52.6	55.4	52.8	54.3	51.1	46.2	35.5	41.7	47.1	52.5	47.8	50.4	48.6
Source: Korea Meteorological Administration (snow and percent sunshine 1981–2010)

== Flora and fauna ==
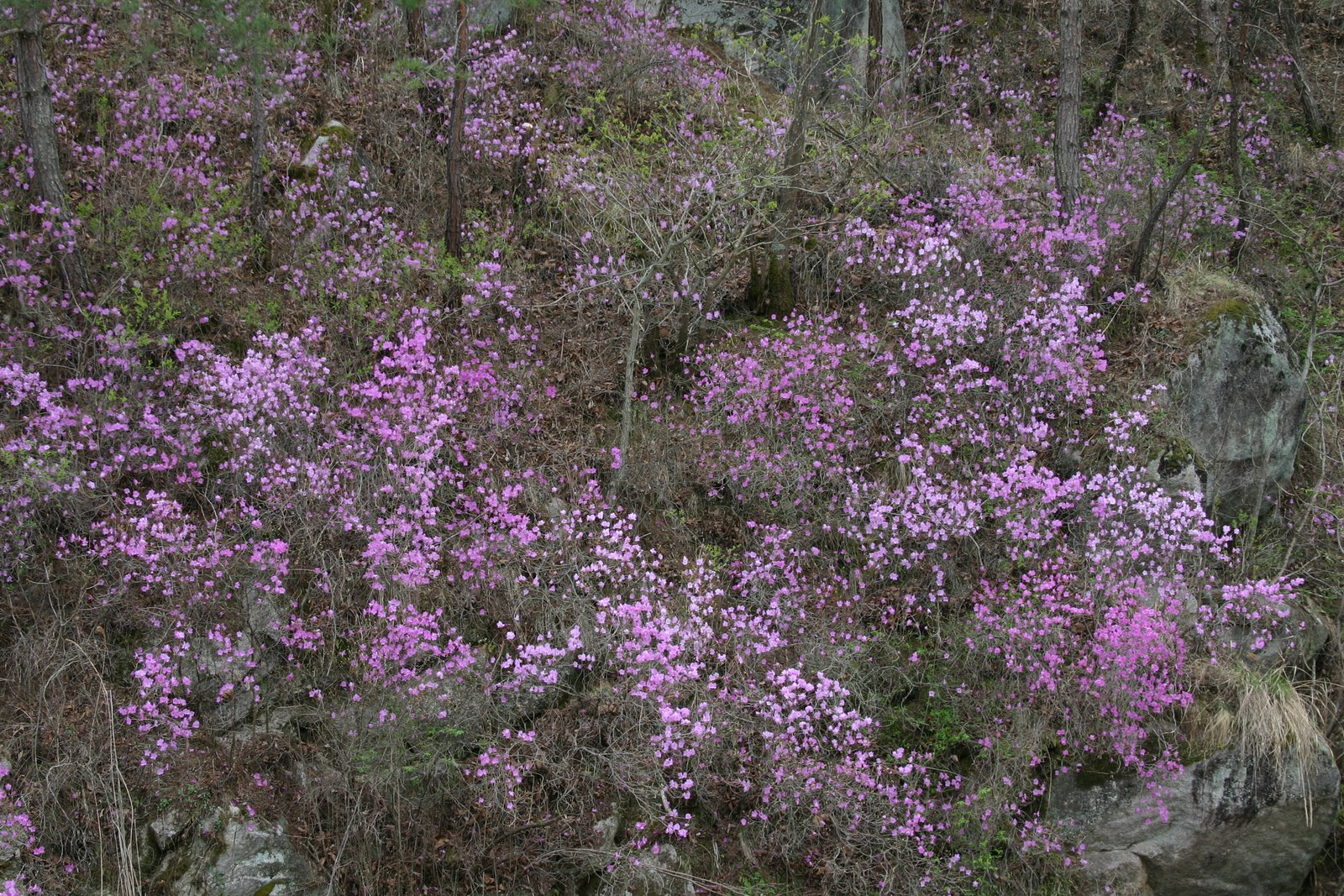
Blooming Azalea, the county flower

Daisy fleabane, a native plant of North America, was inadvertently introduced to Korea in the 1990s and is found in Hongcheon County also. A strange spot on its leaf was found in daisy fleabanes in June 2011. This was tested in the laboratory and found to be caused by a pest identified as Septoria erigerontis.

== Rice cultivation ==
The dominant crop grown in the country is called the Sura rice. The county, with its widely varying temperatures between day and night times, and with clean and un polluted water, provides an ideal environmental condition ideal to grow this crop which is considered to be of very high quality with cooked rice retaining its taste for much longer than other species of rice. It is grown in 38% of the land under cultivation in the county. It is also disease resistant and can be stored for a long time.

== Culture ==
The county is noted for its beef production with its climatic conditions favorable for raising male calves (bred by artificial insemination) which are bred for their exquisite flavor and texture. They are fed alcohol-fermented feed which is reported to reduce the cholesterol content and give flavor to the beef. The calves are raised for minimum of 27 months.

Cultural festivals celebrated in Hongcheon include the Chal Oksusu (Corn) Festival, Mugunghwa (Hibiscus) Festival, and Ginseng Festival. The Mugunghwa Festival honors the memory of Namgung Eok, a statesman and journalist from Hongcheon. The Hongcheon Ginseng Festival, first held in 2003, is held annually in October to celebrate the medicinal properties of ginseng, considered a miracle medicine in Korea. Traditional Taekkyeon and Dudrak performances are part of the festivities. Previously, the county celebrated Choi Seung-hee Dance Festival in honor of a dancer who developed modern forms of traditional folk dances, but because she spent the latter years of her life in North Korea, she is no longer celebrated.

== Symbol Mark ==
Among the five colors of Mugunghwa petals, blue symbolizes the spirit of the county people, green symbolizes the unpolluted natural environment. Pink symbolizes the fragrance of flowers. Yellow symbolizes the peace of Hongcheon. Red symbolizes the passion of Hongcheon.

The center of the flower represents the cohesive power of the Hongcheon people and the green water droplets in the lower part represent a clean earth.

== Character ==
The name of the character is Mugung-gi (literally Eternal-flag) - a symbol of Hongcheon with MugungHwa (literally Eternal Flower) central to its design incorporating other elements.

The water droplets representing the nature of Hongcheon were expressed to the face. The high-tech antenna on the right expressed its meaning as a character leading the information age.

== Notable sites ==
The Korean peninsula has been subject to archaeological excavations for establishing obsidian (a naturally occurring volcanic glass formed as an extrusive igneous rock) at many Paleolithic sites. One such site excavated is located in Hongcheon county, known as Hahwageri III. Several samples collected from the site have been subject to carbon dating. In the first cultural layer, out of the two layers established during the excavations, the finds consists of microliths of obsidian and quartz crystal which are embedded in microblade cores. In addition, arrowheads, cores, anvils, hammerstones and pecking tools have also been recovered, apart from a large cache of obsidian artifacts.

The Suta Temple of Mt Gongjak is a Buddhist shrine at the foot of the Gongjak Mountain which appears like a peacock spreading its wings and its flora consists of azalea and ancient pine trees. It is a national monument that was built in 708, in stone, by the Buddhist priest WonHyo during the reign of King SeongDeok, the 33rd King of Silla.

== Notable people ==
It is the birthplace of Lee Young-Pyo, who gained global recognition as the legendary leftback of the 2002 South Korea national football team which reached the semifinal of 2002 World Cup, and went on to play for various top tier teams in Europe such as Tottenham Hotspur and PSV Eindhoven to great acclaim.
