= Hoengseong County =

Coordinates: 37°29′23″N 127°59′15″E

Hoengseong
- County
- Panoramic view of Hoengseong-eup

- Flag

- Location in South Korea
- Country: South Korea
- State: Gangwon
- Administrative divisions: 1 eup, 8 myeon

Area
  - Total: 997.82 km^{2} (385.26 sq mi)

Population (September 2024)
  - Total: 46,238
  - Density: 47/km^{2} (120/sq mi)

Korean name
- Hangul: 횡성군
- Hanja: 橫城郡
- RR: Hoengseong-gun
- MR: Hoengsŏng-gun

Hoengseong County (Korean: 횡성군) is a county located in the southwestern part of the South Korean state of Gangwon, bordering Pyeongchang County to the east, Yangpyeong County, Gyeonggi Province to the west, Hongcheon County to the north, and the city of Wonju and Yeongwol County to the south.

The roots of Codonopsis lanceolata (더덕; deodeok), a bonnet bellflower species, play an important role in local agriculture, as does Hanwoo beef, a specialty product.

The Korean Minjok Leadership Academy, a notable boarding school, is located in the county, an autonomous private high school that recruits students nationwide.

== History ==
During the Goguryeo period (A.D. 413–475), it was called Hoengcheon-hyeon (橫川縣) or Eosamae (於斯買).[8] During the reign of King Gyeongdeok of Silla (AD 551), it was changed to Hwangcheonhyeon (潢川縣) and became the Yeonghyeon of Sakju (now Chuncheon). In the Goryeo Dynasty, it was changed to Hoengcheon again and subordinated to Sakju as before. Afterwards, it was made as a sub-hyeon of Wonju. In 1413 (13th year of King Taejong), Hyeongam was placed during the Joseon Dynasty, and Hoengcheon and Hongcheon were renamed Hoengseong in 1414 to avoid confusion due to the similar pronunciation.

== Symbols ==
- Tree : Zelkova
- Flower : Peony
- Bird : Heron

== Environment ==
The terrain is the Charyeong Mountain Range (車嶺山脈), which branches off from Odaesan of the Taebaek Mountain Range, and extends southwest through the eastern part of the county, and is surrounded by high mountains in the east, south, and north, and the west is a gentle slope.

To the north are Suri Peak (960m), Balgyosan (髮校山, 998m), Taeui Mountain (台議山, 675m), and Oeum Mountain (五音山, 930m), and to the east are Unmusan (雲霧山, 980m), Bongbok Mountain (鳳腹山, 1,022m), Taegi Mountain (泰岐山, 1,261m), Cheongtaesan (靑太山, 1,180m), and Sajasan (獅子山, 1,120m). To the south, it is surrounded by Maehwasan (梅花山, 1,084m), Chiaksan (雉岳山, 1,288m), Hyangnobong (香爐峰, 1,043m), Namtaebong (南台峰, 1,182m), Baehyangsan (拜向山, 808m), and Satgatbong (1,030m), and to the west, Seongjibong (聖地峰, 791m). The characteristic of the mountains within the county is that all the mountains except Bongboksan border the county, forming a circular shape surrounding the county area.

== Climate ==
Hoengseong has a monsoon-influenced humid continental climate (Köppen: Dwa) with cold, dry winters and hot, rainy summers. The climate reflects the location of the mountainous inland area of southwest. There is a wide seasonal difference in temperature. The highest temperature ever recorded in Hoengseong-gun was 37.0 °C (98.6 °F) on August 7, 1990 and the lowest was −29.8 °C (−21.6 °F) on December 31, 1927, and it was one of the five coldest temperatures ever recorded in Korea.

== Population ==
Hongseong's decline of population is the biggest matter among the county's residents and officers. The staggering decline has forced the educational system to close small schools (less than ten students per school) to close. Hoengseong county has established incentives for enrolling in the schools.

== Korean beef ==
Han-u, or Korean beef, from Hoengseong is widely sold and famous in South Korea. The clean environment of the region makes it possible to rear high-quality Korean beef. The muscles of the cattle are built up through labour in the fields. Beef sets are delivered to department stores in Seoul and other metropolitan cities. Nowadays, improvements to transportation infrastructure have helped reduce the cost. The county began a strategic marketing campaign in 1995 to brand itself as the origin of the highest quality beef in Korea.

== Recreational Areas ==
The Hoengseong area features large forested areas thanks to its location. More than four forest resorts are still in operation.

Forests are not completely natural, man-made forests are blended into existing natural forests. All kinds of wildlife, including roe deer, wild pigs, and rabbits, inhabit the forests.

== Wind farms ==
Schemes for building wind farms started in 2005 and allowed investors to complete the construction of a first complex in January 2008.

Hoengseong did install wind power plants after 2009. Construction was planned and executed by Japanese developer Eurus Energy and POSCO, installing about 20 plants around windy area. Total plant locations were divided between the counties of Hoengseong (9) and Pyeongchang (11), respectively.

== Sister cities ==
- Linhai, Zhejiang, China
- Kakegawa, Shizuoka Prefecture, Japan
- Seocho-gu, Seoul

== Famous people ==
Famous people born in Hoengseong County include Kim Heechul of Super Junior, and Lee Hyung-Taik.

== See also ==
- Geography of South Korea

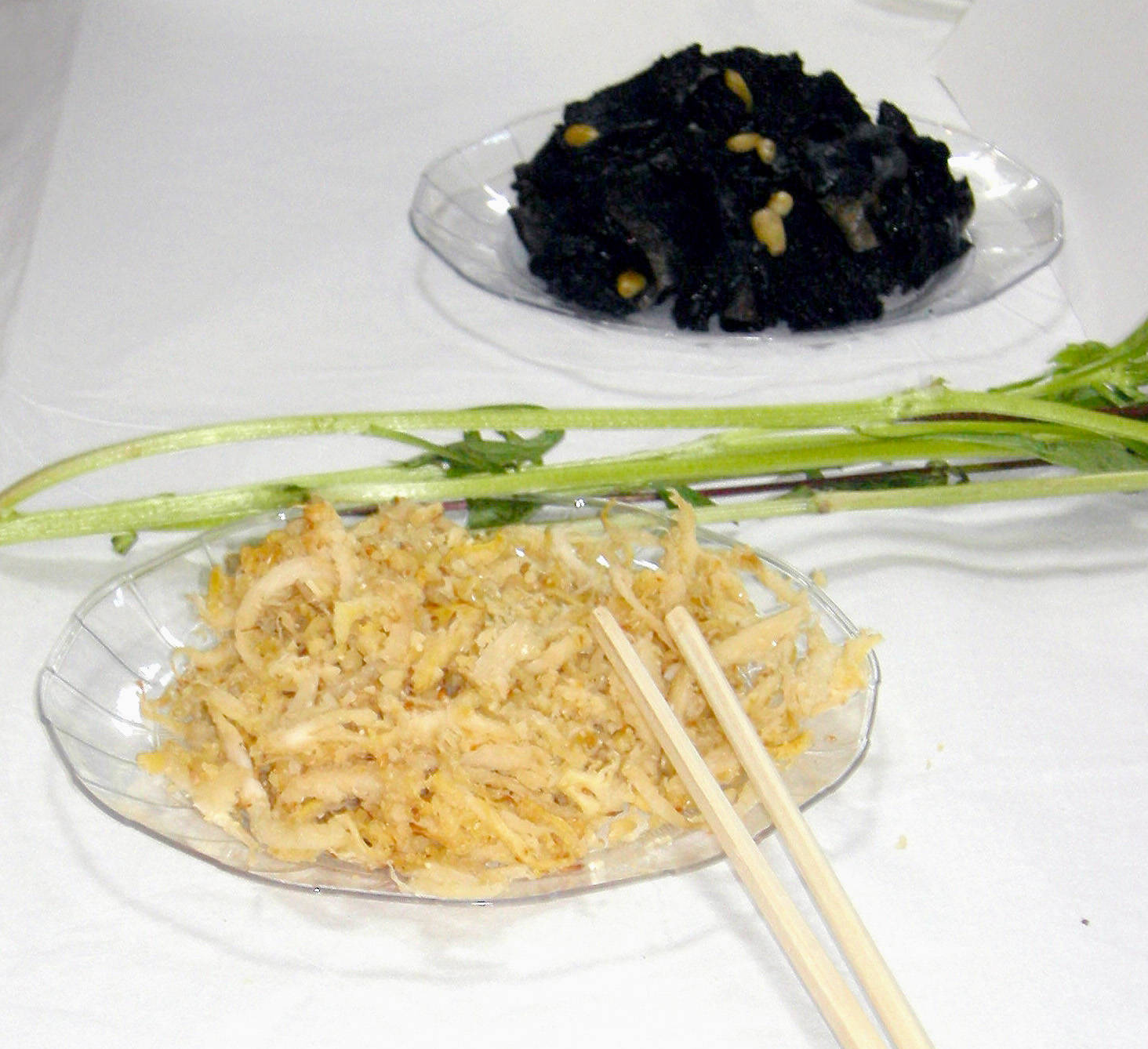
Deodeok muchim, a Korean salad made from C. lanceolata
