= Daemisan =

Daemisan (Korean: 대미산; Hanja: 大美山) is the name of two mountains in South Korea:

- Daemisan (North Gyeongsang/North Chungcheong), 1,115m, in Mungyeong of Gyeongsangbuk-do, and Jecheon of Chungcheongbuk-do
- Daemisan (Gangwon), 1,243.4m, Pyeongchang
