= Sipjabong =

Mountain in South Korea

Highest point
- Elevation: 985 m (3,232 ft)

Geography
- Location: South Korea

Korean name
- Hangul: 십자봉
- Hanja: 十字峰
- RR: Sipjabong
- MR: Sipchabong

Sipjabong (Korean: 십자봉) is a South Korean mountain between the cities of Wonju, Gangwon Province and Jecheon, North Chungcheong Province. It has an elevation of 985 m (3,232 ft).

== See also ==
- List of mountains in Korea
