= Bukbawisan =

Mountain in South Korea's South Chungcheong Province

Highest point
- Elevation: 722 m (2,369 ft)

Geography
- Location: South Korea

Korean name
- Hangul: 북바위산
- Hanja: 北바위山
- RR: Bukbawisan
- MR: Pukpawisan

Bukbawisan (Korean: 북바위산) is a mountain between the cities of Chungju and Jecheon, North Chungcheong Province in South Korea. It has an elevation of 722 m (2,369 ft).

== See also ==
- List of mountains in Korea
