= Guhaksan =

Mountain in South Korea

Highest point
- Elevation: 971 m (3,186 ft)

Geography
- Location: South Korea

Korean name
- Hangul: 구학산
- Hanja: 九鶴山
- RR: Guhaksan
- MR: Kuhaksan

Guhaksan (Korean: 구학산) is a mountain on the boundary between Gangwon Province and North Chungcheong Province, South Korea. Its area extends across the cities of Wonju and Jecheon. Guhaksan has an elevation of 971 m (3,186 ft).

== See also ==
- List of mountains in Korea
