= Choi Geum-jin =

South Korean poet

Choi Geum-jin (Hangul 최금진; born 1970) is a South Korean poet. He is known for his straightforward portrayal of poverty and marginalization using humor and satire. Born in Jecheon, South Korea, he graduated from Chuncheon National University of Education. He went onto earn his master's and doctoral degrees for Korean language and literature at Hanyang University. In 2008, he won the inaugural Oh Jang-hwan Literature Prize. He has lectured at various institutions including Dongguk University and Kyung Hee Cyber University, and currently teaches at Gwangju University and Hanyang University.

== Life ==
Choi Geum-jin was born in Jecheon, South Korea in 1970. His grandfather, grandmother, and cousins took their own lives or suffered premature deaths. His father, drunk, jumped into a river and drowned when he was three. He has often alluded to his tragic family history in his poetry. After graduating from Chuncheon National University of Education, he worked at an elementary school for eight years. He won the Kangwon Ilbo New Writer's Contest in 1997 and the Chi-Yong New Writer's Award in 1998. However, he only began writing in earnest after he won the Changbi Prize for New Figures in Literature in 2001 for five poems, including "Sarange daehan jjalmakan jilmun" (사랑에 대한 짤막한 질문 A Short Question about Love). To date, three of his poetry collections and one essay collection have been published. He obtained his master's and doctoral degrees in Korean language and literature at Hanyang University. In 2008, he was awarded the inaugural Oh Jang-hwan Literature Prize. He has lectured at Dongguk University and Kyung Hee Cyber University. Currently, he lives in Gwangju and teaches at Gwangju University and Hanyang University.

== Writing ==
Choi's poems expose the contradictions of capitalist society in blunt, cynical terms. Using unusual metaphors, they depict the impoverished lives of marginalized people. His first poetry collection Saedeurui yeoksa (새들의 역사 The History of Birds) recounts his distressing personal history and explores the rock bottom of human existence; it universalizes a person's struggle and defeat to fate. Detailing Choi's own experiences fraught with poverty, misfortunes, and deprivation, his poetry is filled with dark emotions like pain, guilt, and delusion.

Choi's second poetry collection Hwangeumeul chajaseo (황금을 찾아서 In Search of Gold) is notable for its insights on social issues drawn from everyday life. The collection features people in destitution who do not have the luxury to dream or hope, and describes how they resort to scratching off lottery tickets as they fantasize about striking it rich. While Choi accurately portrays the pitiful lives of people who sink into despair or perish in a capitalist society, his ultimate goal is not to simply illustrate such misery. The images he creates of life at rock bottom are filled with squalor, yet have what one book review describes as "a certain harrowing beauty." The poems don't reveal any ambition to upset the money-driven world order. But by capturing the beauty of people who embrace their painful daily struggle, Choi shows that their existence is valuable in itself.

Choi's third poetry collection Sarangdo upssi gaemigwisin (사랑도 없이 개미귀신 Antlions without Love) continues to view society in a critical light, and at the same time conveys his longing for "what is beautiful and human."

== Works ==
1. 새들의 역사(창비, 2007)

The History of Birds. Changbi, 2007.

2. 황금을 찾아서(창비, 2011)

In Search of Gold. Changbi, 2011.

3. 사랑도 없이 개미귀신(창비, 2014)

Antlions without Love. Changbi, 2014.

== Awards ==
1. 1997: Kangwon Ilbo New Writer's Contest

2. 1998: Chi-Yong New Writer's Award

3. 2001: Changbi Prize for New Figures in Literature

4. 2008: Oh Jang-hwan Literature Prize
