= Daemisan (North Gyeongsang and North Chungcheong) =

Mountain in South Korea

Highest point
- Elevation: 1,115 m (3,658 ft)

Geography
- Location: South Korea

Korean name
- Hangul: 대미산
- Hanja: 大美山
- RR: Daemisan
- MR: Taemisan

Daemisan (Korean: 대미산) is a South Korean mountain between the cities of Jecheon, North Chungcheong Province and Mungyeong, North Gyeongsang Province. It has an elevation of 1,115 m (3,658 ft).

== See also ==
- List of mountains in Korea
