= Daemisan (Gangwon) =

Mountain in South Korea

Highest point
- Elevation: 1,243.4 m (4,079 ft)

Geography
- Location: South Korea

Korean name
- Hangul: 대미산
- Hanja: 大美山
- RR: Daemisan
- MR: Taemisan

Daemisan (Korean: 대미산) is a mountain in Pyeongchang County, Gangwon Province, South Korea. It has an elevation of 1,243.4 m (4,079 ft).

== See also ==
- List of mountains in Korea
