= Lee Byungryul =

South Korea poet, television writer, and prose writer

Lee Byungryul (born 1967) is a South Korea poet, television writer, and prose writer. He is viewed as having a tendency for lyrical poetry. He is the only writer in Korea to have published a travel essay and sold more than a million copies of it. For a long time he was a writer for MBC Radio, and currently he is the president of the publisher, Dal, an imprint of Munhakdongne. In 2006, he won the 11th Contemporary Poetry Award.

== Life ==
Lee Byungryul (born 1967) is a South Korea poet, television writer, and prose writer. He was born in Jecheon, Chungcheongbuk-do. He had first started writing when he wanted to list all the things he likes and he hates. He graduated from Seoul Institute of the Arts in creative writing. He started his literary career when he was selected for the 1995 Korea Times New Writer's Contest. In 2006, he won the 11th Contemporary Poetry Award. He also worked as a writer for the MBC radio show, Lee Sora's FM Music City. Meanwhile, he has also written a critical biography on John Lennon, and he began to be publicly known as he published travel books such as Kkeullim (끌림 Attraction), and Barami bunda dangsini jotda (바람이 분다 당신이 좋다 The Wind Blows, and I Like You). His travel essays not only describe the travel locations as well as episodes that have happened on location, but also communicate with the reader and describe the sight of the travel locations with new emotions. He is currently the only writer to have sold more than 1 million copies of travel essays in South Korea. He is currently the president of the publisher, Dal, an imprint of Munhakdongne, and a member of Sihim.

== Writing ==
Lee Byungryul is a lyric poet. His works deal with life's various scenes such as love, parting, and death. His first poetry collection, Dangsineun eodingaro garyeohanda (당신은 어딘가로 가려한다 You are trying to go somewhere), details the image of a lonely person. However, the poet does not remain isolated, and tries to reach out to the outside world. This is because he knows that 'a person's shadow coming over a person's home is a wonderfully beautiful thing'. He has shown that he carefully observes objects or persons, as well as loving, caring, and having compassion for them. Here, his poetry became a provider of warmth to a life of heaviness and tragedy, of loneliness and isolation.

Such an aesthetic critical mind also continues in Lee Byungryul's later poems. However, his poetry have shown diverse elements according to the era. His second poetry collection, Baramui sasaenghwal (바람의 사생활 The Wind's Personal Life) (Changbi, 2006), expressed a strong feeling of greatly longing for someone. The poet showed attachment to things that cannot be reached, and things that cannot be easily said. In Chanlan (찬란 Brilliance), by thinking about what 'living' means, he makes the readers aware that the act of living itself without stopping is something that is 'brilliant'. In Nunsaram yeogwan (눈사람 여관 Snowman Motel) (Moonji Publishing, 2013) the poet strives for a meaning of existence that penetrates the moment as well as eternity, facing 'himself' as a poetic consciousness. Here, the poet shows his awareness that literature is like an endless journey to find one's self in order to understand the existence of 'I'. After such thinking process, he concludes that 'I' is a 'person' that has cultivated countless 'relationships' that an individual has in society. Lee Byungryul is praised as a poet that has been able to describe such philosophical insights in lyric expression.

== Works ==
=== Poetry collections ===
- Dangsineun eodingaro garyeohanda (당신은 어딘가로 가려한다 You are Trying to Go Somewhere), Munhakdongne, 2003.
- Baramui sasaenghwal (바람의 사생활 Private Life of Wind), 2006
- Chanlan (찬란 Radiant), 2010
- Nunsaram yeogwan (눈사람 여관 Snowman Motel), 2013

=== Essay collections ===
- Kkeullim (끌림 Attraction), Random House Korea, 2005.
- Barami bunda dangsini jotda (바람이 분다 당신이 좋다 Wind Blows, I Like You), 2012
- Eo tuen nal 1 (어떤 날1 One Day1), 12013
- Nae yeope itneun saram (내 옆에 있는 사람 The Person Next To Me), 2015

=== Works in Translation ===
- 起風時 我愛你 (Chinese)
- 那男那女 (Chinese)

== Awards ==
2006 Contemporary Poetry Award
