= Jecheon =

City in North Chungcheong, South Korea

Coordinates: 37°08′N 128°13′E

- Municipal City
- Panoramic view of Jecheon

- Flag Emblem of Jecheon

- Location in South Korea
- Country: South Korea
- Region: Hoseo
- Administrative divisions: 1 eup, 7 myeon, 9 dong

Government
  - Mayor: Kim Chang-gyu (김창규)

Area
  - Total: 882.47 km^{2} (340.72 sq mi)

Population (September 2024)
  - Total: 129,066
  - Density: 146.26/km^{2} (378.80/sq mi)
  - Dialect: Chungcheong
- Time zone: UTC+9 (Korea Standard Time)
- Area code: (+82) 43-6xx

Korean name
- Hangul: 제천시
- Hanja: 堤川市
- RR: Jecheon-si
- MR: Chech'ŏn-si

Jecheon (Korean: 제천; Korean pronunciation: [tɕe.tɕʰʌn]) is a city in North Chungcheong Province, South Korea. The city is a major railway junction or a transportation mecca, served by the Jungang, Chungbuk and Taebaek Lines. Jecheon has scenic surroundings and several tourist spots like the Uirimji Reservoir, Cheongpung Lake and Cheongpung Cultural Properties complex. It is also the home of Semyung University

The city's name derives from the Korean words je (堤, which means "dam") and cheon (川, which means "river").

== Location ==
Jecheon is located in the northern part of North Chungcheong Province bordering Mungyeong to the south, while Wonju and Yeongwol-gun, which are located in Gangwon Province, are to the north. It is well known for its mountains and lake environments. Jecheon is well known as the "healing city". A wide variety of traditional medical and herbal products and therapies are available, attracting people all over Korea to visit the city.

As Korea's overall inland mountainous area, the natural environment is well preserved, and the air is so clear and pleasant that most mountain villages do not lose. Since there are not many ruins or tourist facilities in the city, Uirimji, built during the Samhan period, is used as a representative tourist destination.

Herbs are famous as local specialties. In particular, Hwanggi is said to distribute 80% of the nation's distribution through local herbal markets.

== Climate ==
Jecheon has a monsoon-influenced humid continental climate (Köppen: Dwa) with cold, dry winters and hot, rainy summers.

It is so cold that it often snows in April, commonly called Jeberia. There are even times when it hits minus 20 degrees Celsius in winter. Along with Bonghwa-gun, Gyeongsangbuk-do, it is the coldest winter region in the region south of Gangwon State and Gyeonggi-do. When a cold wave warning is issued in a nearby area, it is common to issue a cold wave warning, and padding is a must-have for winter rather than a coat. This is because it is an inland region and a double basin of 300m above sea level consisting of high mountains easily exceeding 1,000m above sea level, such as Chiaksan, Sobaeksan, and Wolaksan. As a result, it is an area where the annual temperature difference is quite large, similar to Cheorwon-gun when it is really cold. According to the official observation, the lowest temperature ever recorded was -27.4 °C on January 4, 1981. Since the 2010s, -25.9 °C recorded on January 6, 2010 and February 3, 2012 was the lowest.

Climate data for Jecheon (1991–2020 normals, extremes 1972–present)
Month	Jan	Feb	Mar	Apr	May	Jun	Jul	Aug	Sep	Oct	Nov	Dec	Year
Record high °C (°F)	13.6 (56.5)	20.5 (68.9)	23.2 (73.8)	32.2 (90.0)	33.7 (92.7)	34.8 (94.6)	37.5 (99.5)	39.4 (102.9)	33.1 (91.6)	28.3 (82.9)	24.0 (75.2)	16.0 (60.8)	39.4 (102.9)
Mean daily maximum °C (°F)	1.6 (34.9)	4.8 (40.6)	10.8 (51.4)	18.1 (64.6)	23.4 (74.1)	27.1 (80.8)	28.6 (83.5)	29.3 (84.7)	25.1 (77.2)	19.5 (67.1)	11.4 (52.5)	3.7 (38.7)	17.0 (62.6)
Daily mean °C (°F)	−4.8 (23.4)	−1.9 (28.6)	3.8 (38.8)	10.5 (50.9)	16.2 (61.2)	20.8 (69.4)	23.5 (74.3)	23.8 (74.8)	18.5 (65.3)	11.5 (52.7)	4.4 (39.9)	−2.6 (27.3)	10.3 (50.5)
Mean daily minimum °C (°F)	−10.8 (12.6)	−8.3 (17.1)	−2.9 (26.8)	2.9 (37.2)	9.2 (48.6)	15.2 (59.4)	19.7 (67.5)	19.8 (67.6)	13.3 (55.9)	5.1 (41.2)	−1.6 (29.1)	−8.3 (17.1)	4.4 (39.9)
Record low °C (°F)	−27.4 (−17.3)	−25.9 (−14.6)	−17.7 (0.1)	−8.0 (17.6)	−0.5 (31.1)	4.8 (40.6)	9.7 (49.5)	9.9 (49.8)	0.6 (33.1)	−7.2 (19.0)	−14.9 (5.2)	−24.8 (−12.6)	−27.4 (−17.3)
Average precipitation mm (inches)	20.3 (0.80)	32.2 (1.27)	49.7 (1.96)	85.1 (3.35)	96.9 (3.81)	147.5 (5.81)	356.0 (14.02)	300.9 (11.85)	145.3 (5.72)	57.4 (2.26)	43.4 (1.71)	24.6 (0.97)	1,359.3 (53.52)
Average precipitation days (≥ 0.1 mm)	6.6	6.3	8.2	8.5	8.8	9.7	16.7	14.5	9.6	5.8	8.0	7.2	109.9
Average snowy days	7.6	6.5	3.8	0.5	0.0	0.0	0.0	0.0	0.0	0.2	1.9	5.8	26.2
Average relative humidity (%)	68.1	64.4	61.3	57.0	62.4	68.1	77.6	76.7	75.6	73.0	70.7	70.3	68.8
Mean monthly sunshine hours	175.1	174.4	201.0	213.3	236.0	208.4	151.4	166.1	168.0	192.3	157.6	164.4	2,208
Percentage possible sunshine	53.6	53.5	52.1	54.8	52.7	48.1	35.9	43.2	47.4	55.8	50.2	51.6	49.5
Source: Korea Meteorological Administration (snow and percent sunshine 1981–2010)

== Tourism ==
Ten views in the city:

- Uirimji
- Bakdaljae
- Woraksan Mountain
- Cheongpoong cultural town, Hoban
- Geumsusan
- Yonghagugok
- Songgyegyegok
- Oksunbong
- Taksajeong
- Baeronseongji
- Solbat Park
- Deokjusansang Fortress
- Jecheon Hyanggyo
- Cheongpungho Lake Observatory

== Twin towns – sister cities ==
Jecheon is twinned with:

- Hualien City, Taiwan
- Pasay, Philippines
- Qichun County, China
- Spokane, United States
- Zhangshu, China

== Notable people from Jecheon ==
- Kim So-hui (김소희), taekwondo practitioner
- Park Sang-ha (박상하), volleyball player
- Jung Woong-in (정웅인), actor
- Lee Sang-kyu (이상규), activist, labourer and politician
- Lee Byungryul (이병률), poet, television writer, and prose writer
- Choi Geum-jin (최금진), poet
- Uhm Jung-hwa (엄정화), singer, actress and dancer
- Hwiyoung (Real Name: Kim Young-kyun, 김영균), singer, dancer, actor and K-pop idol, member of K-pop boygroup SF9
- Microdot and Sanchez, rappers, brothers, grew up in Auckland City, New Zealand.
- Lim Sung-jin (임성진), volleyball player

== See also ==
- List of cities in South Korea
- People Power Party (South Korea)
