= Mireuksan =

Mireuksan (미륵산; 彌勒山) is the name of several mountains in South Korea:

- Mireuksan (Gangwon-do)
- Mireuksan (Jeollabuk-do)
- Mireuksan (Gyeongsangbuk-do)
- Mireuksan (Gyeongsangnam-do)
