= Iksan National Museum =

National museum in Iksan, South Korea

- Iksan bakmulgwan
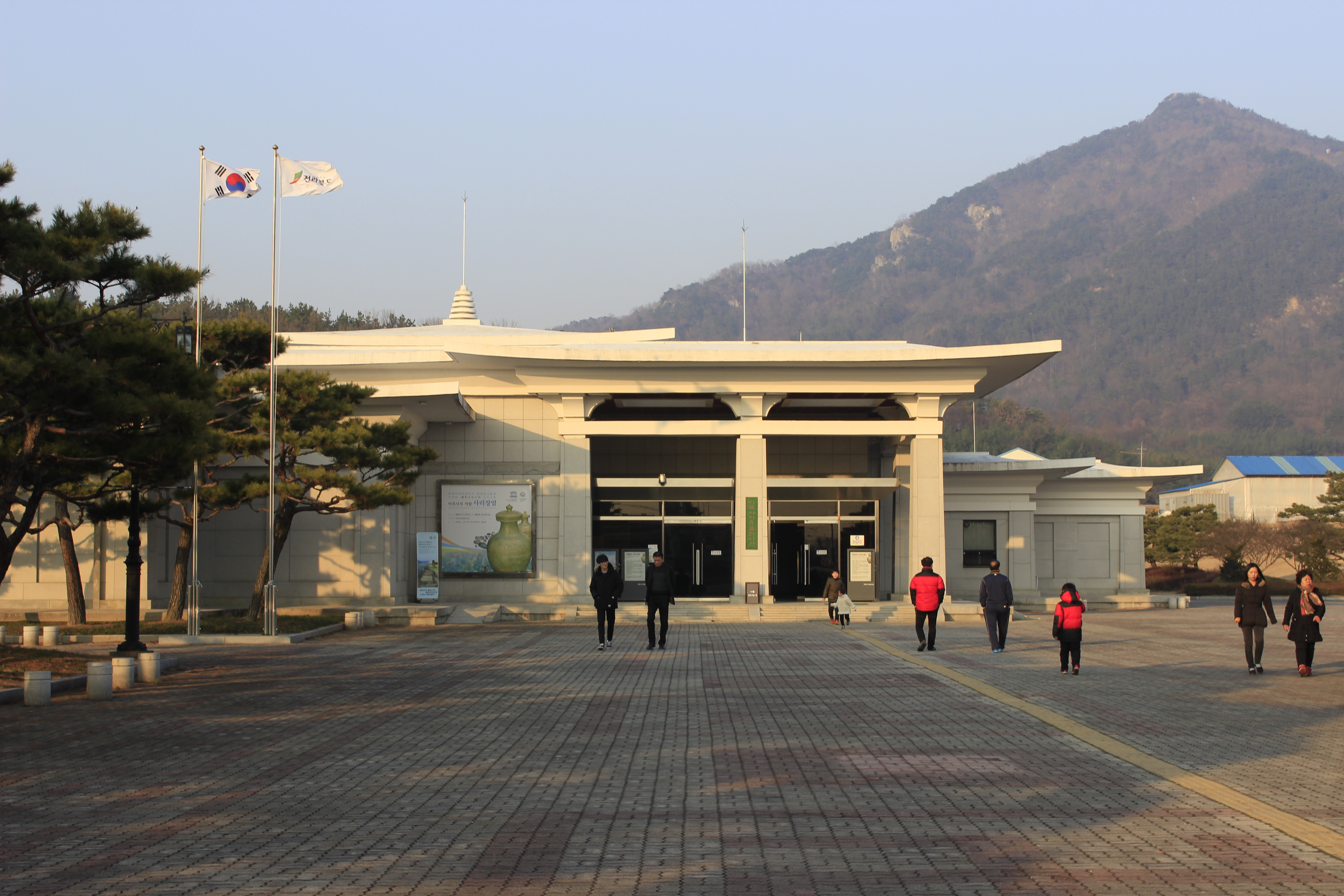
- Established: 1994
- Location: Iksan, South Korea
- Coordinates: 36°00′42″N 127°01′43″E
- Type: Relics exhibition
- Director: Jong Wook Chae
- President: Han Ok Baek
- Website: Iksan National Museum

The Iksan National Museum (Korean: 국립익산박물관), formerly the Mireuksaji Museum is located in the city of Iksan, in the North Jeolla Province, South Korea. Iksan was the capital of the Baekje kingdom. The museum displays and preserves the relics excavated from the Mireuksa site, a Buddhist temple, and location of the Mireuksaji Stone Pagoda.

It holds different cultural events and summer school for students. Through this, it puts a lot of effort to be a national museum. It also runs various exhibitions and seminars. It opens from 9 am to 6 pm on weekdays, and it closes on every Monday and the first of January of every year.
