= Iksan Jewelry Museum =

Jewelry museum in Iksan, South Korea

- 익산 보석박물관
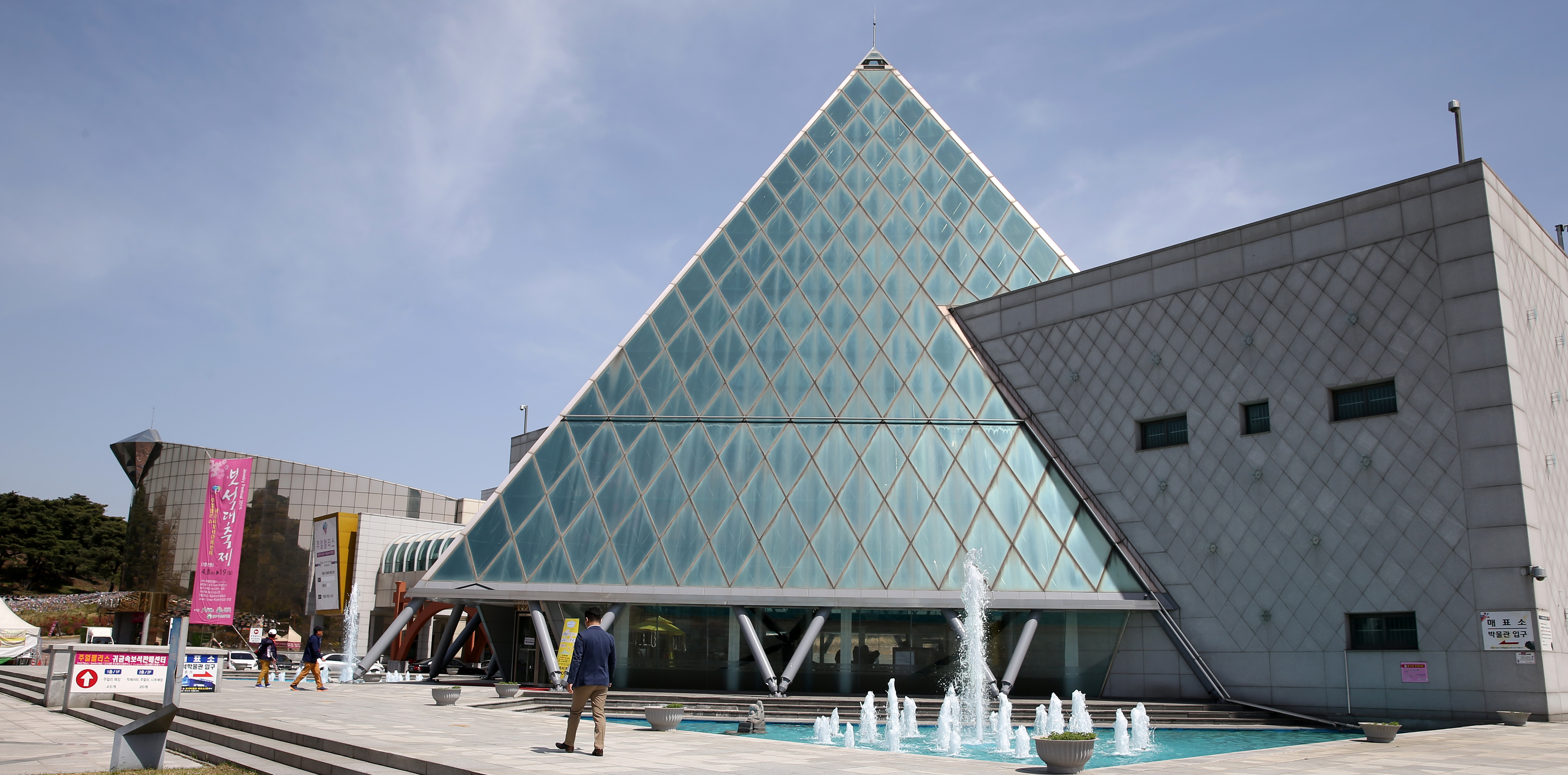
- Established: 2002-05
- Location: Iksan, South Korea
- Coordinates: 35.5931°N 127.615°E
- Type: Exhibition
- President: Kim Suk Jae
- Website: www.jewelmuseum.go.kr

The Iksan Jewelry Museum (익산 보석박물관) is a museum in Iksan, South Korea. It was built to provide cultural space related to Baekje relics for tourists and educate them about jewelry and knowledge of it including symbols.
