= Mireuksan (North Jeolla) =

Mountain in South Korea

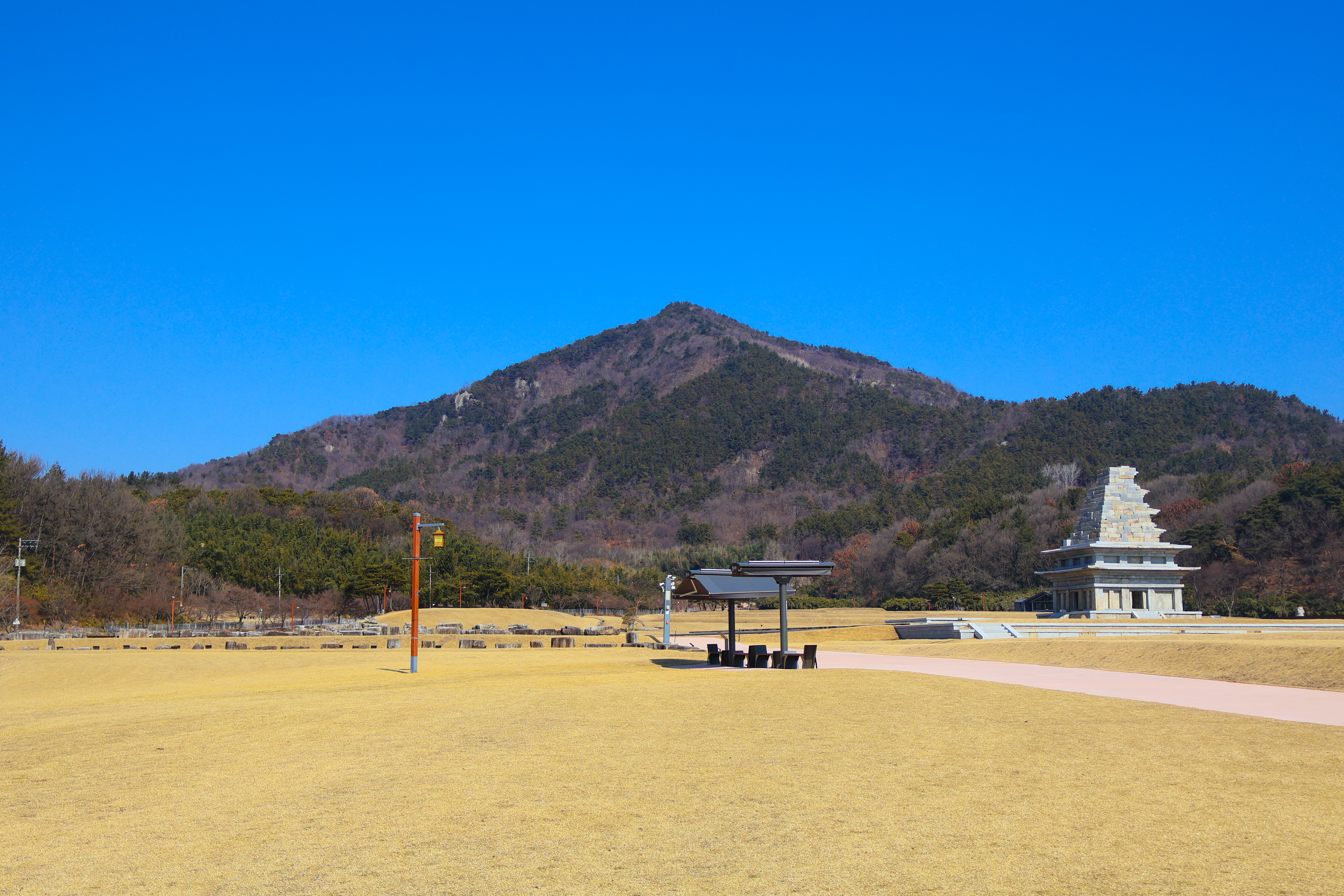
- View from the east

Highest point
- Elevation: 430.2 m (1,411 ft)

Geography
- Location: North Jeolla Province, South Korea

Mireuksan is a mountain of North Jeolla Province, western South Korea. It has an elevation of 430 metres.

It is a mountain located to the northeast of Iksan in North Jeolla Province. It is the patron mountain for Iksan, as well as being host to three temples on its slopes.

There are multiple hiking paths allowing public access to its peak, Janggunbong (장군봉), which can usually be reached in less than an hour from most of the trail heads. The trails are regularly maintained with more significant renovations from time to time.

In fall 2011, with funding from the Iksan Tax Office and Nexelon (solar cell manufacturer), the Mireuksan Circumferential path (미륵산 둘레길) was opened, providing an alternative activity to simply ascending to the summit. Via this new path one may circle the entire mountain around its base, on small footpaths or small one lane village lanes over the course of approximately 16–18 km dependent on which trails one selects along the way. The route offers new views of the surrounding areas with newly installed signage, indicating distances and destinations, though only in Hangeul. In addition to the wood signs, yellow ribbons bearing "미륵산둘레길" guide the way over the newer sections of trail. Granite obelisks bearing an illustration of a snail (representing the ideal of "taking it slow") have been installed at certain turnpoints of the trail in late 2012.

There is a stone wall, part of the Mireuk Mountain Fortress (미륵산성), on the east slope which is walkable, also. This dates from the Baekje period where there used to be a fortification situated on the mountain.

To the north of the summit is Chima Rock (치마 바위) which faces west from the ridge, offering unobstructed view over the valley. Due to its favorable location and wind characteristics, it is one of the local paragliding launch sites. This area is accessible by vehicle via a concrete access road leading up the ridge to a private antenna site (approximately 300m ASL).

Between the antenna sites and main summit, there is one helipad.

At the bottom of the mountain on its south face is a museum detailing the temple that was once found at this site. There are two stone pagodas, the east one being a reproduction to original specification and the west pagoda under reconstruction. Originally, there was also a wooden pagoda, taller than the two stone pagodas, sited between the two. The museum contains a scale model of the original temple once found on this site, as well as much other information. For more information about this specific site, see Mireuksa.

Refreshment at the peak is often limited to a small gimbap stand, which may not always be operational nor is the gimbap made on site, usually being carried up the mountain Ice cream or other refreshments may be available. Otherwise one has recourse to a few tent stands at the trailheads as well as some well established restaurants at the roadside across from the main park entrance (including a well reputed fresh tofu soup (Sundubu jjigae 순두부 찌개) restaurant).

The mountain site is accessible by car, bus, or taxi from Iksan. It is reachable via bicycle on the smaller, more direct back roads in under an hour. The trails themselves are not rideable.

Parking lots (free of charge) are located at some trail heads, including the A, B, and C courses.

The hiking courses are as follows:

- A -- 1.9 km, from the Jeonbuk Science High School (restroom on site)
- B -- 2.9 km, from the Mireuksaji parking lot (restroom on site)
- B -- 1.2 km, from fresh water spring (약수터) parking lot (restroom on site) (potable water at spring)
- C -- 2.4 km, from parking lot by sign for Byeol Jang Garden (별장가든) (restroom on site)
- D -- 2 km, from Guryong Village (구룡마을) (passes through Saja Temple (사자암))
- E -- 2.7 km, from Nangsan below Simgok Temple (심곡사)
- F -- 2.6 km, from Jukchong Village (죽총마을) then joining the antenna site access road along the ridge
- G -- 2.5 km, from Jukchong Village, following the seasonal stream along the valley up to the ridge between the summit and antenna site (left to antennas, right to summit, straight to descend via the J course)
- H -- 1.4 km, from 베데스타기도원, passes over mountain fortress (미륵산성)
- I -- 1.5 km, from Arirang Pass (아리랑고개) (connects to Yonghwasan to the east), passes over the mountain fortress (미륵산성)
- J -- 2 km, from Woesan Village (외산마을)
- Mireuksan Dullegil (미륵산 둘레길) -- Start/finish at any of the aforementioned trail head locations, length varies

In the amateur radio award program, Summits On The Air, Mireuksan's unique reference number is HL/JB-168 (being classified as the 168th highest summit in the Jeonbuk Province, according to the program's criteria). As the peak falls between 150 and 499 meters, it is valued at one point for the radio operator who activates the summit, likewise one point for the chaser operator at another location contacting the summit-based operator.

== See also ==
- List of mountains of Korea
