= Mireuksan (Gangwon) =

Mountains in South Korea

Highest point
- Elevation: 1,118.8 m (3,671 ft)

Geography
- Location: South Korea

Korean name
- Hangul: 미륵산
- Hanja: 彌勒山
- RR: Mireuksan
- MR: Mirŭksan

Mireuksan (Korean: 미륵산) is a mountain in Wonju, Gangwon Province, South Korea. It has an elevation of 1,118.8 m (3,671 ft).

== See also ==
- List of mountains in Korea
