= Mireuksa =

Buddhist temple in Iksan, South Korea

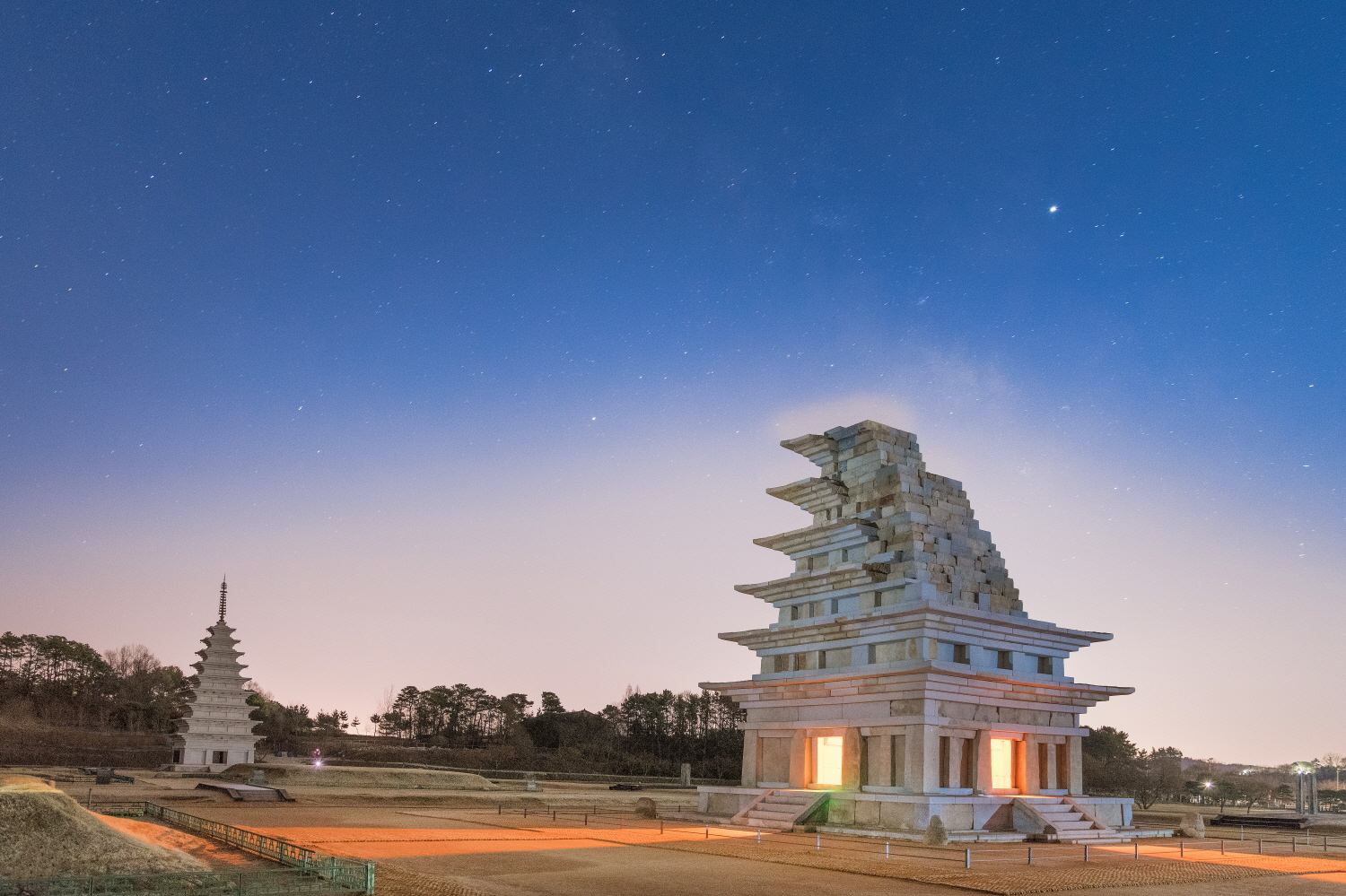
- Iksan Mireuksaji Stone Pagoda at night (2019)

- Location within South Korea

Religion
- Affiliation: Buddhism

Location
- State: North Jeolla Province
- Country: South Korea
- Coordinates: 36°N 127°E

Architecture
- UNESCO World Heritage Site
- Criteria: Cultural: (ii), (iii)
- Designated: 2015
- Parent listing: Baekje Historic Areas
- Reference no.: 1477
- Historic Sites of South Korea
- Official name: Mireuksa Temple Site, Iksan
- Designated: 22 June 1966
- Reference no.: 150

Korean name
- Hangul: 미륵사
- Hanja: 彌勒寺
- RR: Mireuksa
- MR: Mirŭksa

Mireuksa (Korean: 미륵사; Hanja: 彌勒寺) was the largest Buddhist temple in the ancient Korean kingdom of Baekje. The temple was established in 602 by King Mu and is located 36.012083 N, 127.031028 E, modern Iksan, North Jeolla Province, South Korea. The site was excavated in 1980, disclosing many hitherto unknown facts about Baekje architecture. Mireuksaji Stone Pagoda is one of two extant Baekje pagodas. It is also the largest as well as being among the oldest of all Korean pagodas.

The legend of the creation of Mireuksa is told in the Samguk yusa. King Mu and his queen were said to have seen a vision of Maitreya at a pond on Yonghwasan. The King promptly had the pond drained to establish the Mireuksa temple complex. The nine-storey wooden pagoda that once stood in the center of the complex is said to have been the work of Baekje master craftsman Abiji.

Designated South Korean Historic Site No. 150, Mireuksa has been partially restored and now includes a museum.

On 20 June 2018, the second restoration of the Mireuksa pagoda was completed.

== Layout ==
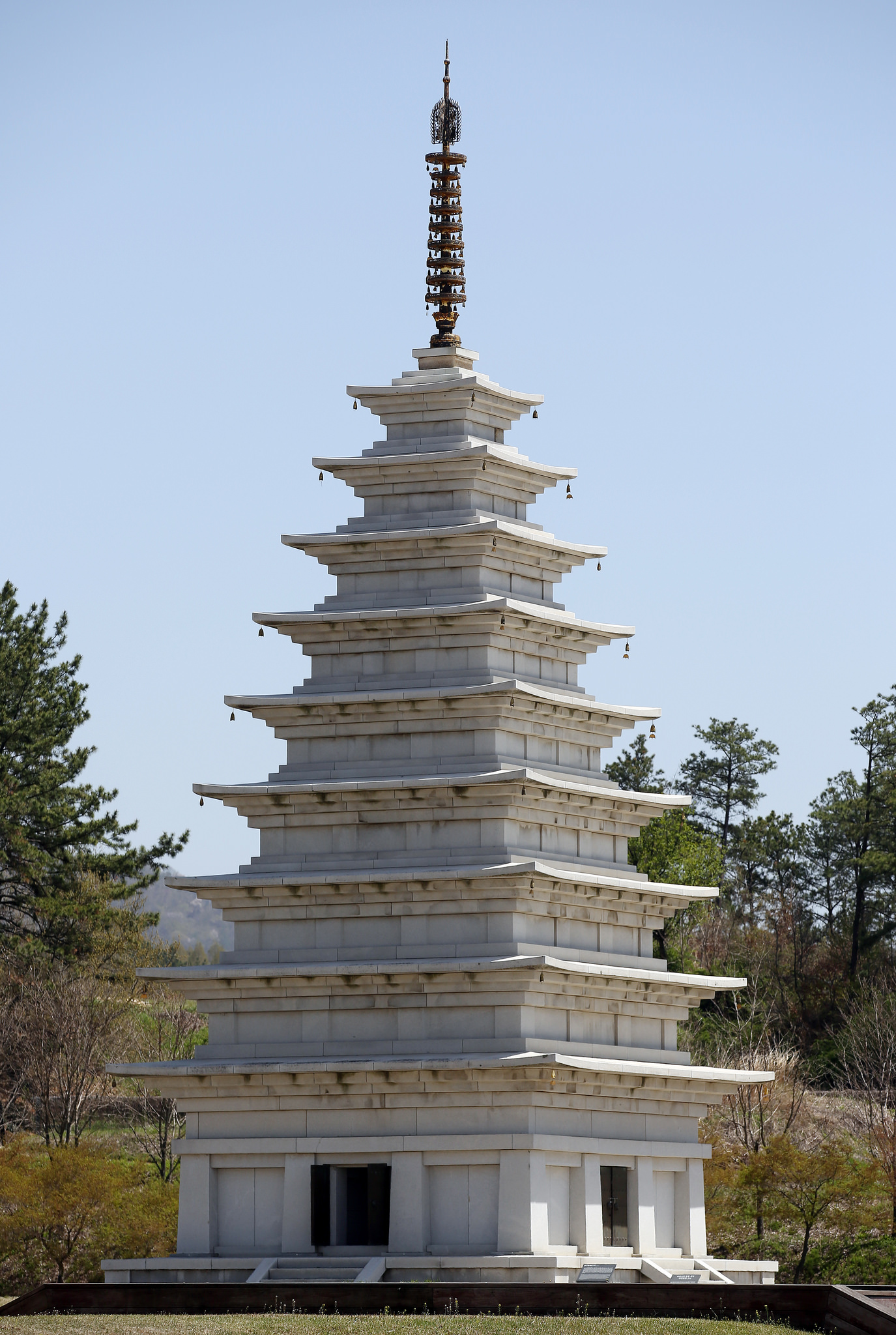
A reconstruction of the eastern stone pagoda, known as Dongtap. It is 30 meters in height.

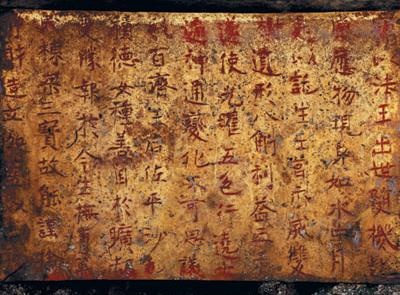
Gold plate found in west pagoda

The complex included a central wooden pagoda flanked by two stone pagodas. A causeway seems to have led to the outer entrance of the walled complex. Mireuksa temple had a unique arrangement of three pagodas erected in a straight line going from east to west, each with a hall to its north. Each pagoda and hall appear to have been surrounded by covered corridors, giving the appearance of three separate temples of a style known as "one Hall-one Pagoda."

The pagoda at the center was found to have been made of wood, while the other two were made of stone. The sites of a large main hall and a middle gate were unearthed to the north and south of the wooden pagoda.

=== Mireuksaji Stone Pagoda (National Treasure No. 11) ===
Mireuksaji Stone Pagoda was designated as a national treasure of Korea on 20 December 1962 and is the oldest and largest stone pagoda that has survived into modern times. This pagoda was the western pagoda. It is believed to have been built during the reign of King Mu, who ruled from 600 to 640. The pagoda is architecturally significant because it shows how the Baekje adapted their knowledge of woodworking to stone. An example of wood pagoda building techniques being adapted to stone is the fact that the base of the pagoda is low and only one story, like a wood pagoda. From this stone pagoda, scholars can see wood working techniques, which is especially useful because many Korean wood pagodas have not survived the ravages of time and war. Currently, the pagoda has six floors. However, scholars are uncertain of how many storeys the pagoda would have actually reached. Each side of the first story is divided into three sections, and the middle section contains a door which leads into the pagoda. Walking into the center of pagoda, one can observe a massive central pillar. There are also corner pillars and stone supports which mimic wooden support pillars. The corners of the roof of the pagoda were slightly raised up and each progressive story was smaller than the one that preceded it.

During excavations in January 2009, a gold plate was evacuated from the west pagoda. The plate had inscriptions in Classical Chinese on both sides, describing when and why Mireuksa temple was built. Etched into gold, the letters were inlaid with red paint, or juchil (Hanja: 朱漆), which was a technique reserved for important items or works of art.

The inscription, in the original Chinese, reads:

(front)
竊以法王出世隨機赴
感應物現身如水中月
是以託生王宮示滅雙
樹遺形八斛利益三千
遂使光曜五色行遶七
遍神通變化不可思議
我百濟王后佐平沙乇
積德女種善因於曠劫
受勝報於今生撫育萬
民棟梁三寶故能謹捨
淨財造立伽藍以己亥

(rear)
年正月卄九日奉迎舍
利願使世世供養劫劫
無盡用此善根仰資大
王陛下年壽與山岳齊
固寶曆共地同久上弘
正法下化蒼生又願王
后卽身心同水鏡照法
界而恒明身若金剛等
虛空而不滅七世久遠
并蒙福利凡是有心俱
成佛道

Roughly translated into English, this becomes,

Coming to think of this, the Buddha (法王) came to this world in synchronisation with and response to the will of the many disciples of Buddhism, and this is like the moon shining in water. Thus the Buddha was born into a palace and achieved Nirvana under a sal tree, leaving behind eight pieces of sarira, benefiting three thousand worlds. So surely, if the sarira, which shines in five colours, were to be turned seven times in respectful rite, the resultant divine transformation would be indescribable. Our Queen of Baekje, (one of King Mu's Queen Consorts) as the daughter of Jwapyeong (佐平) Sataek Jeokdeok, (沙乇積德) planted benevolence through the ages, and with the karma she has received in her present life, she educated the people. She, being a great supporter of the Buddha's teachings, established temples with her wealth and received this sarira on the twenty-ninth day of the first month of the Gihae year. (March 9, 639 AD according to the Julian calendar) We pray, through the charity of ages and founding upon this act of benevolence, that the longevity of His Imperial Majesty (King Mu; 大王陛下) should stand firm like the mountains and that his reign should be eternal with the heavens and the earth. We pray for the spread of the Righteous Way (正法) above, and the flourishing of all people (蒼生) below. We pray again that the body and heart of the Queen become like a water-mirror, ever reflecting Dharma. Let her precious body never perish as with the skies, and give her happiness unto many generations, and let all Buddhist followers achieve Enlightenment.

=== Treasure No. 236 ===
Also surviving at Mireuksa are flagpole supports of the temple site (Mireuksaji Danggan Jiju). These two massive stones are set 90 centimeters apart. During special celebrations, a flagpole would sit and be supported by the two stone pillars. There were three holes for flags per pillar. The first pair of holes were square while the other two pairs were round. The base of the flagpoles has not survived. The undecorated nature of the pole, save for horizontal stripes carved on the exterior of the two poles, suggests that the poles were created during Later Silla.

== Preservation and restoration ==
In 1910, only a part of the west pagoda (South Korean National Treasure No. 11) was still standing. In 1914, the Japanese government supported it with a concrete backing. In the late 20th century, Korean archaeologists conducted extensive excavations, laying the foundation for a partial reconstruction and the interpretive center. The west stone pagoda's concrete support has been removed beginning in 1999, and the entire structure was dismantled. The complete restoration was completed in June 2018.

== Archaeological importance ==
Among the many finds at the temple complex have been stone lanterns and the foundation stones for the columns and terraces on which the temple structure stood. Private houses were simple structures with wooden floors. One record indicates that these houses were reached by ladders. Archaeologists excavating the Mireuksa and Imgangsa temple sites have exhumed tall foundation stones on which wooden floors would have rested. It would appear that this feature was adapted from private houses. The raised floor and heating system later became a characteristic structure of the Korean house.

== See also ==
- List of Baekje-related topics
- Korean architecture
- Korean Buddhist temples
- National treasures of Korea
