= Mireuksaji Stone Pagoda =

Pagoda in Mireuksa, Iksan, South Korea

Coordinates: 36.0123353°N 127.0295236°E

Stone Pagoda at Mireuksa Temple Site, Iksan 益山 彌勒寺址 石塔
- 익산 미륵사지 석탑
- Iksan Mireuksaji Stone Pagoda after restoration

Location
- Location: Giyang-ri, Geumma-myeon, Iksan, North Jeolla Province
- Country: South Korea
- Interactive map of Stone Pagoda at Mireuksa Temple Site, Iksan 益山 彌勒寺址 石塔

Architecture
- Founder: King Mu of Baekje
- Completed: 600~640

Website
- http://iksan.museum.go.kr/

- Mireuksaji Stone Pagoda
- Hangul: 익산 미륵사지 석탑
- Hanja: 益山 彌勒寺址 石塔
- RR: Iksan Mireuksaji seoktap
- MR: Iksan Mirŭksaji sŏkt'ap

Iksan Mireuksaji Stone Pagoda (Korean: 익산 미륵사지 석탑; Hanja: 益山 彌勒寺址 石塔) is located in the former temple Mireuksa, Geumma-myeon, Iksan, North Jeolla Province, and is the oldest stone pagoda remaining in Korea. It is designated as the 11th national treasure.

This stone pagoda, built in 639 during the reign of King Mu, is called the primitive style(始原形式) of Baekje pagoda, and in many ways it is the starting point of the entire pagoda in Korea. At the time of dismantling, the height was 14.2m, which is the largest stone pagoda in Korea, and is estimated to be 9 stories originally based on extant materials. This stone pagoda realized the wooden pagoda architecture in stone and reflects the appearance and style of Baekje wooden pagoda.

== History and Characteristics ==
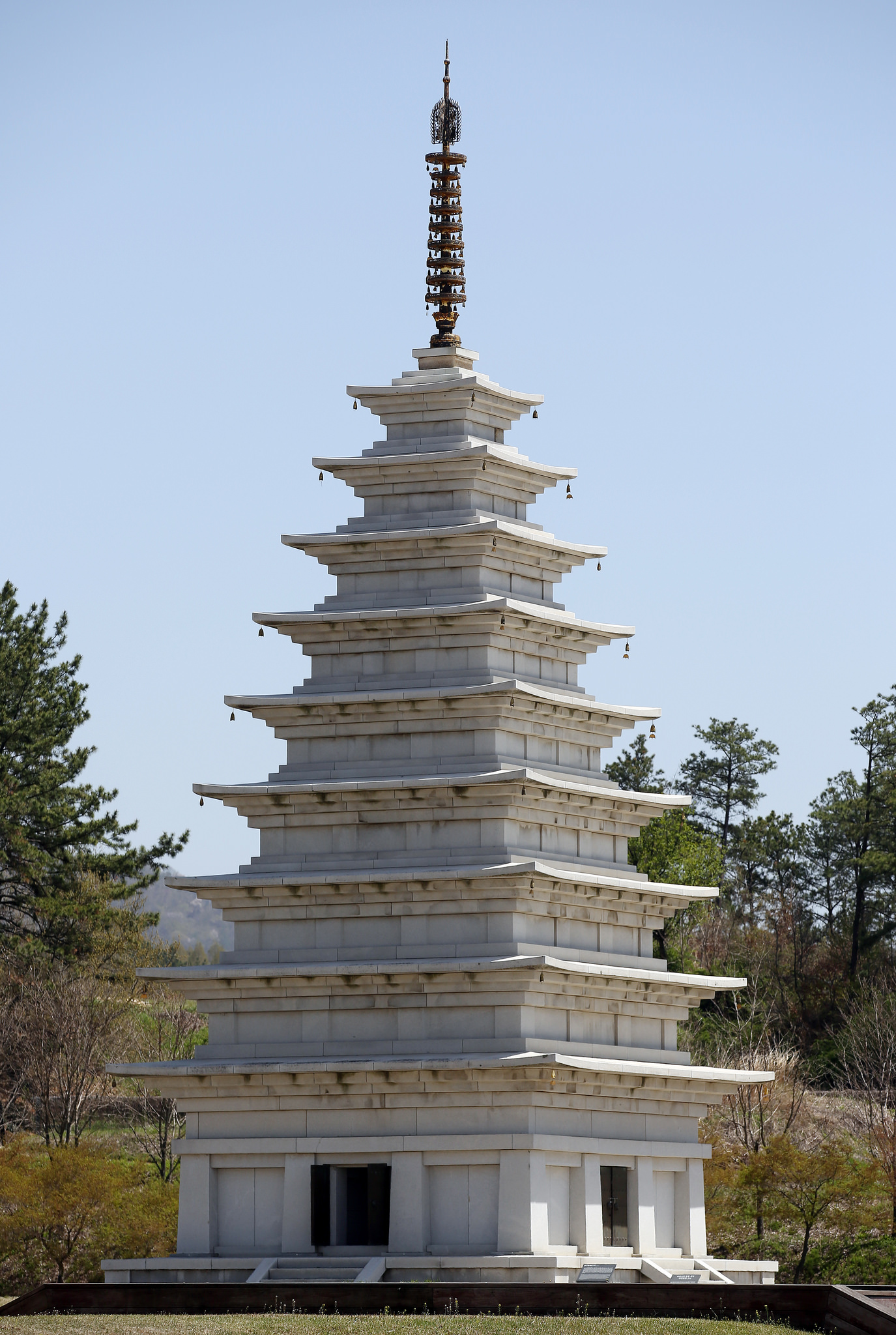
The reconstructed East Pagoda based on the remaining West Pagoda

In 639, the site of Mireuksa was built during the late Baekje. It is the oldest and largest remaining stone pagoda in Korea. It is an important cultural property that faithfully shows the process of transitioning from wooden tower to stone pagoda.

This stone pagoda is called the primitive style of Baekje Stone Pagoda. In many ways, it is considered to be the starting point of the whole Korean pagoda. This stone pagoda with granite is unlike the Silla style pagoda. It is a pile of multi-storied pagoda of three sides in the base of a square partitioned by a gravel stone.

Most of the western side and the southern side, and about half of the northern side are collapsed, and the number of floors is only up to 6th floor. Restoration took place to repair the pagoda. The extensive restoration process included removing the concrete support applied on the tower during Japanese colonization.

The complete reconstruction of the long-gone East Pagoda, another stone pagoda which once stood at Mireuksa alongside the remaining stone pagoda (also called the West Pagoda), was finished in 1993 based on its counterpart's architecture. The reconstruction began in 1991 under the supervision of the Cultural Properties Bureau at the time of the Roh Tae Woo administration. The stone pagoda of Mireuksaji was once claimed to have had 7 floors originally, but during restoration, a supplementary material was found to indicate that the pagoda had 9 floors. The East Pagoda was rebuilt to have 9 floors accordingly and completed in 1993. However, the legitimacy of the reconstruction is still in dispute.

== Structure ==
The short, single-stepped base of the pagoda is similar to the style of a wooden pagoda. The body of the pagoda was divided into three spaces on each side of the first floor, and a door was made in the middle of the room. Inside the center is a huge square pillar. On the first floor, four pillars were erected on each corner which demonstrate entasis, also used in Korean wooden architecture, featuring a narrow top and bottom in contrast to a convex center. On the pillars, pyeongbang and changbang were installed, which are the components that connect two pillars in wooden architecture. The roof slope is thin and wide, and it is raised up to four corners and raised slightly. From the second floor, the top becomes shallow, the expression of each part is simplified, and the roof is also reduced in width than the first floor.

== Restoration ==
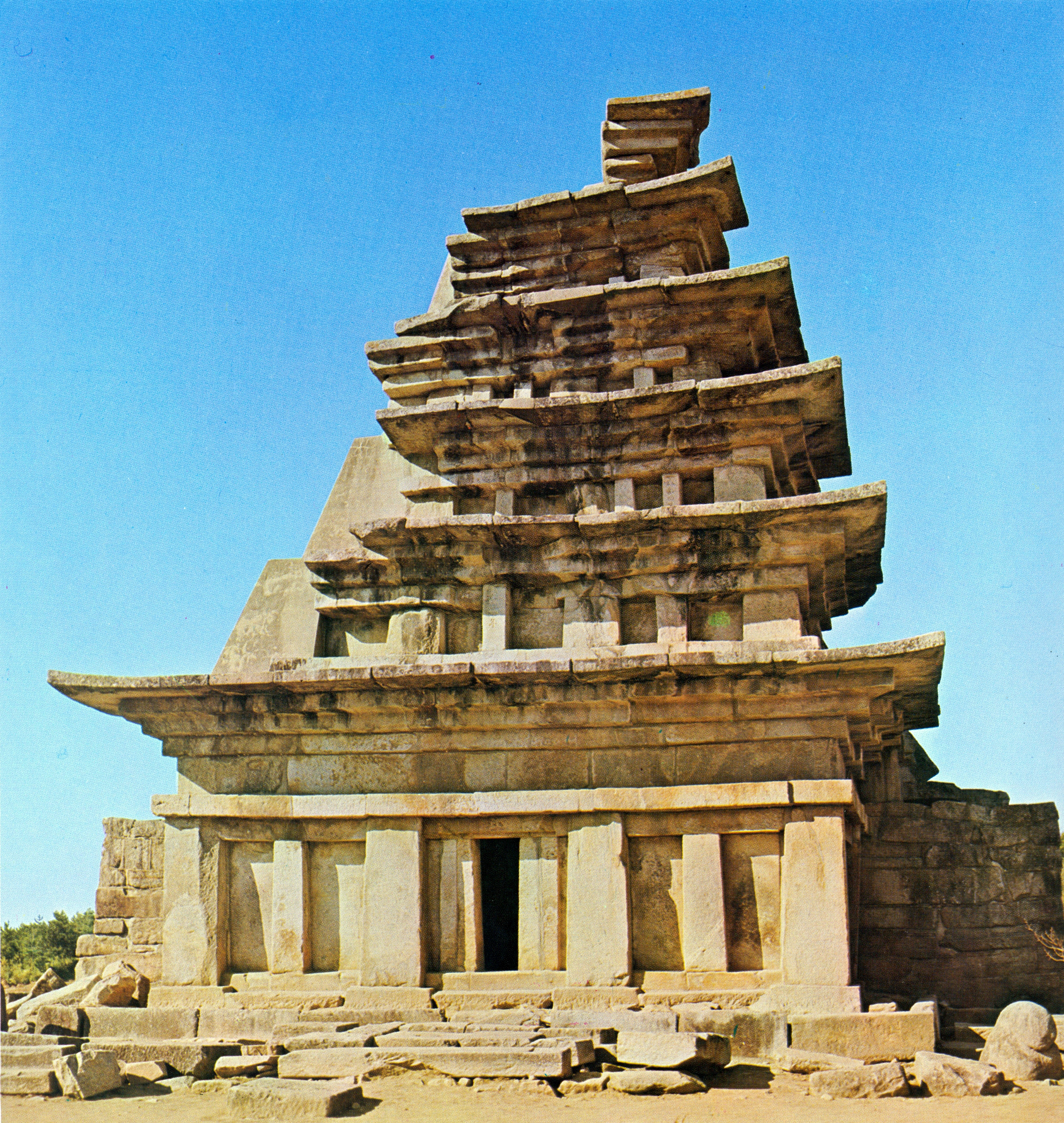
The pagoda with its cement support before extensive restoration

In 1915, it was repaired with cement to prevent the collapse of the tower during Japanese colonial period. However, in April 1994, the government decided to repair the damaged part because it was not beautiful and there was a risk of collapse.

North Jeolla Province completed the basic process from 1998 to 2000, with the preparation for the repair of the Mireuksaji stone pagoda. Since October 2001, the National Institute of Cultural Properties has begun full-scale maintenance.

The repair work for Mireuksaji stone pagoda was planned to be completed in 2007, but due to the fact that it is the largest stone pagoda in East Asia and it is a national treasure, the schedule was delayed and delayed until 2017.

The Cultural Heritage Administration will restore the first and second floors completely symmetrically, and restructure the third and sixth floors before the dismantling. Members of local governments and some experts argue that the tower must be fully symmetrically restored to the fifth floor to prevent its retention and collapse.

The restoration was completed in June 2018.

== Excavation ==
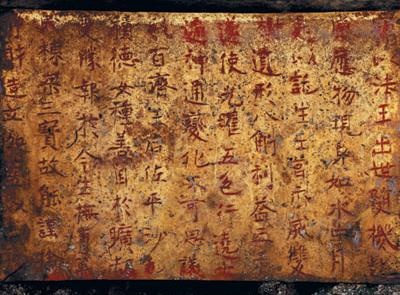
Saribongangi found inside the Mireuksaji Stone Pagoda

Before Restoration.

On January 14, 2009, the National Cultural Properties Research Institute of the Cultural Heritage Administration rehabilitated and restored the stone pagoda of Mireuksa Temple in Iksan. At that time, he found a martial art in the center of the upper surface of the pillar, named Sarijangeom (sarijang-eom, 사리장엄, 舍利莊嚴).

They found a small bottle with a height of 13 cm and a shoulder width of 7.7 cm. As a result of inspecting the inside with X-ray, it was confirmed that it is composed of a double structure of inner and outer box. The variety of patterns and handwork techniques on the surface of Sariho show the excellence of Baekje Metal Craft.

They also found the golden Saribongangi (사리봉안기; 舍利奉安記). The Saribongangi was engraved on the gold plate of 15.5 cm in width and 10.5 cm in height and painted red to make it clearly visible. It is written that Queen Baekje donated riches and founded a temple and prayed for the good of the royal family by sealing the Sari in the year of 639. It is evaluated as a precious stone statue material which can complement the lack of research of literature by precisely establishing the purpose of the founding of Mireuksa, It was more notable that there was a difference from the record of Samguk-Yusa, in which the Queen was recorded as the daughter of "Sa", one of the eight nobles of Baekje, and that Princess Sunwha had created Mireuksa Temple.

The inscription, in the original Classical Chinese, reads:

(front)
竊以法王出世隨機赴
感應物現身如水中月
是以託生王宮示滅雙
樹遺形八斛利益三千
遂使光曜五色行遶七
遍神通變化不可思議
我百濟王后佐平沙乇
積德女種善因於曠劫
受勝報於今生撫育萬
民棟梁三寶故能謹捨
淨財造立伽藍以己亥

(rear)
年正月卄九日奉迎舍
利願使世世供養劫劫
無盡用此善根仰資大
王陛下年壽與山岳齊
固寶曆共地同久上弘
正法下化蒼生又願王
后卽身心同水鏡照法
界而恒明身若金剛等
虛空而不滅七世久遠
并蒙福利凡是有心俱
成佛道

Roughly translated into English, this becomes,

Coming to think of this, the Buddha (法王) came to this world in synchronisation with and response to the will of the many disciples of Buddhism, and this is like the moon shining in water. Thus the Buddha was born into a palace and achieved Nirvana under a sal tree, leaving behind eight pieces of sarira, benefiting three thousand worlds. So surely, if the sarira, which shines in five colours, were to be turned seven times in respectful rite, the resultant divine transformation would be indescribable. Our Queen of Baekje, (one of King Mu's Queen Consorts) as the daughter of Jwapyeong (佐平) Sataek Jeokdeok, (沙乇積德) planted benevolence through the ages, and with the karma she has received in her present life, she educated the people. She, being a great supporter of the Buddha's teachings, established temples with her wealth and received this sarira on the twenty-ninth day of the first month of the Gihae year. (March 9, 639 AD according to the Julian calendar) We pray, through the charity of ages and founding upon this act of benevolence, that the longevity of His Imperial Majesty (King Mu; 大王陛下) should stand firm like the mountains and that his reign should be eternal with the heavens and the earth. We pray for the spread of the Righteous Way (正法) above, and the flourishing of all people (蒼生) below. We pray again that the body and heart of the Queen become like a water-mirror, ever reflecting Dharma. Let her precious body never perish as with the skies, and give her happiness unto many generations, and let all Buddhist followers achieve Enlightenment.
