= Iksan =

City in North Jeolla, South Korea

- Municipal City
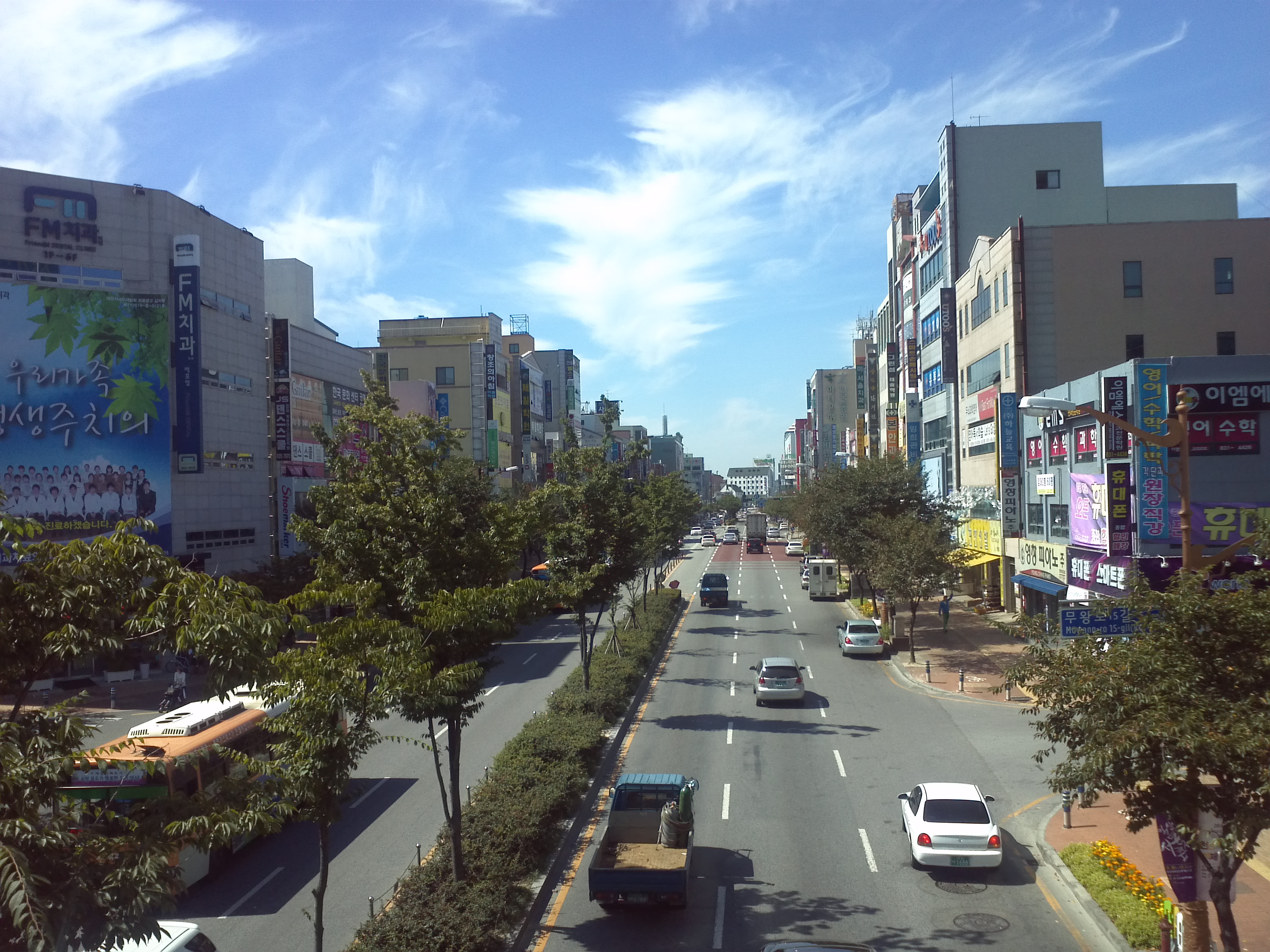
- Main road in Yeongdeung-dong

- Flag

- Location in South Korea
- Coordinates: 35°56′38″N 126°57′16″E
- Country: South Korea
- State: Jeonbuk
- Administrative divisions: 1 eup, 14 myeon, 12 dong

Area
  - Total: 507.07 km^{2} (195.78 sq mi)

Population (March, 2022)
  - Total: 277,151
  - Density: 548/km^{2} (1,420/sq mi)
  - Dialect: Jeolla
- Area code: +82-63-8xx

Korean name
- Hangul: 익산시
- Hanja: 益山市
- RR: Iksan-si
- MR: Iksan-si

Iksan (Korean: 익산; Korean pronunciation: [ik̚.s͈an]) is a city and major railway junction in North Jeolla Province, South Korea.

The city center and railway junction was formerly called "Iri" (Korean: 이리시; Hanja: 裡里市), but merged with Iksan County (Iksan-gun) in 1995.

The railway junction is located at the point where Jeolla and Janghangs meet the Honam Line and the Honam HSR and is served by frequent train service to/from Seoul, Daejeon, Gwangju, Mokpo, Jeonju, Suncheon, and Yeosu.

Jeonbuk National University Iksan campus (before, it was Iksan National College), the Won Buddhism Graduate School, Wonkwang Health Science College, and Wonkwang University are all located in Iksan.

This city is called "The City of Jewelry". The Iksan Jewelry Museum opened in May 2002 next to a Dinosaur museum.

In late November 2006, Korean authorities quarantined a farm in Iksan and began culling poultry and livestock within a 3-kilometer radius to contain an outbreak of the H5N1 bird flu virus.

Local tradition includes the story of Seodong and Seonhwa, which was broadcast from 2005 to 2006 as "Sedongyo" and is also dramatized in the 'Paradise in Autumn Festival.'

Festivals with various themes are held in Iksan, all reflecting local history and culture. These include:

- 10,000,000 Chrysanthemum Festival (held in October/November)
- Iksan Jewelry Expo
- Seodong Festival
- Stone Culture Festival

Anthem: Song of Citizens of Iksan

Iksan's population is 269,429 as of January 2024.

== History ==
Iksan was once the capital of the ancient Baekje Kingdom. Temples built then are still standing. Iksan has always been an important transport center. After the Iri train station explosion in 1977, Iksan fell into a state of decline. However, the city's train station was later rebuilt, and it became the junction of three rail lines named above. It now services KTX and Saemaul trains as well as frequent bus lines. Today, Iksan is once again a thriving city.

== Geography ==
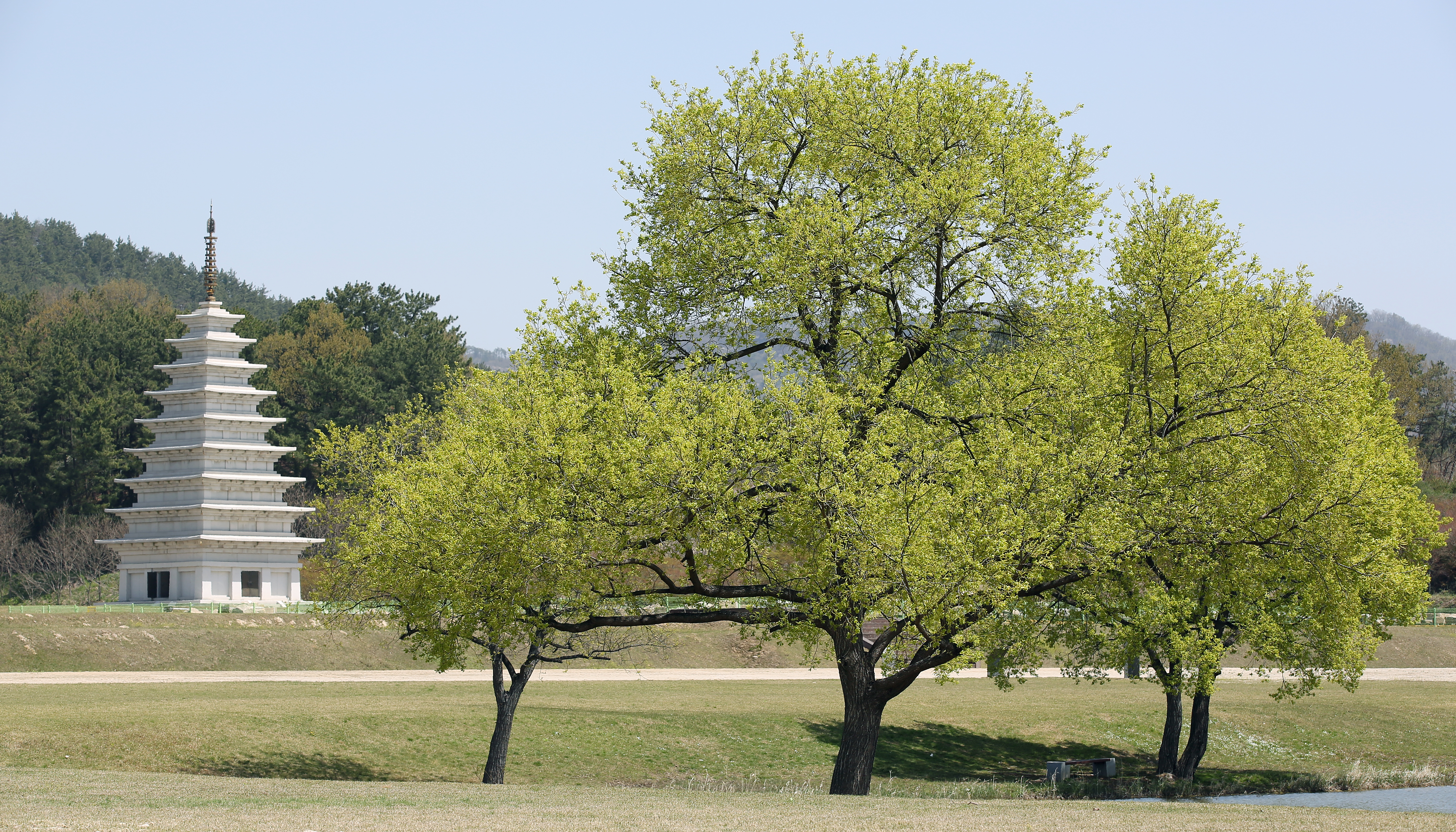
Mireuksaji Stone Pagoda

Iksan is situated on the Okgu and Keumman Plains, which lead to the West Sea [Yellow Sea]. As it is located very near the sea where ships can transport a wide variety of products, Iksan has served as a logistical and traffic center for a long time.

The city is in the northwestern part of Jeollabuk-do. East are the rugged mountains of Mt. Cheonho and Mt. Mireuk (Mireuksan (Jeollabuk-do)) at the edge of the Noryeong Mountains, and northwest the range of Mt. Hamra lead to a series of hills and a great stream that has formed the fertile Okgu plain to the west. Iksan borders Nonsan-gun and Buyeo-gun, Chuncheongnam-do, and is divided by the Keum-gang[river] in the north. It faces the Kimje Plains, divided by Mankyeong-gang, to the south.

== Transportation ==
- Iksan Bus Terminal

The Iksan Bus Terminal (익산종합버스터미널) provides daily bus service to most cities in South Korea. Express buses to Seoul, Ansan, and Incheon are available.

- Iksan Train station

== Culture ==
=== Museums ===
- Iksan Jewelry Museum
- Mireuksaji Museum
- Wanggung-Ri Relics Museum
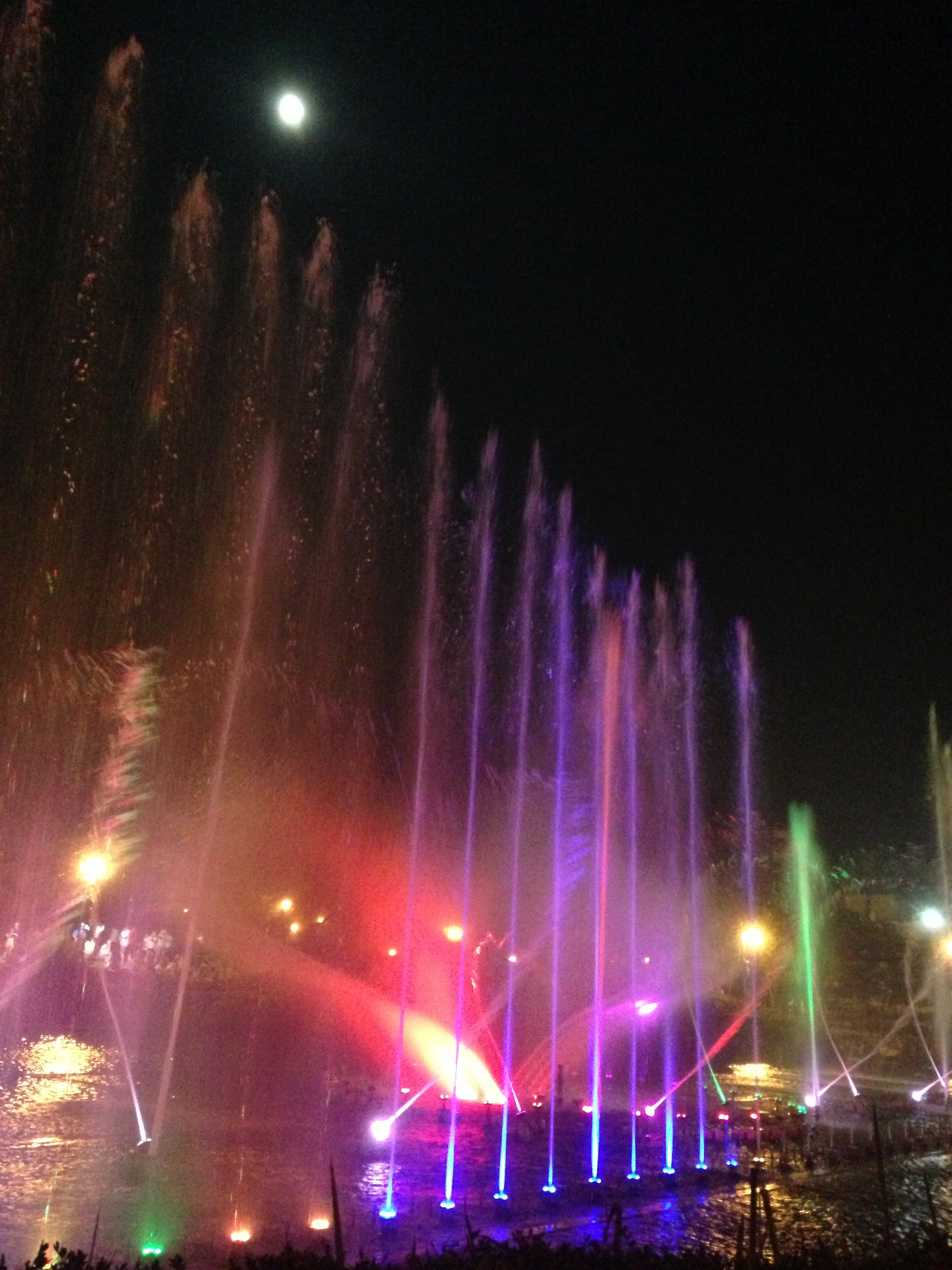
  Music fountain in Iksan Central Park

=== Architecture ===
- Mireuksaji Stone Pagoda

=== Parks ===
- Central Park(Chungang Cheuk Gongwon)
- Seodong Park
- Gemma sculpture park

=== Events ===
- Iksan hosted the 99th National Athletic Meet in 2018.

== Sister cities ==
- China Zhenjiang, Jiangsu
- Denmark Odense, Southern Denmark
- United States, Culver City, California

== Notable people ==
- Birdie Kim, LPGA golfer
- Sunmi (born May 2, 1992), member of the girl group Wonder Girls.
- Park Jeong Seung (stage name Jeongseung, born May 20, 2002), member of the boy group D-Crunch.
- Kim Su A (stage name Baekah, born October 24, 1999), member of the girl group NeonPunch and the sub-unit XUM (Xumething Unlimited Move).
- Dino (birth name Lee Chan, born February 11, 1999), member of the boy group Seventeen (South Korean band).
- Park Jeong Woo (born September 28, 2004), member of the boy group Treasure (band).
- So Jung Hwan (born February 18, 2005), member of the boy group Treasure (band).

== See also ==
- Geography of South Korea
- Honam
- List of cities in South Korea
