= Mireuksan (South Gyeongsang) =

Mountain in Tongyeong, South Gyeongsang Province in South Korea

Coordinates: 34°48′41″N 128°24′59″E

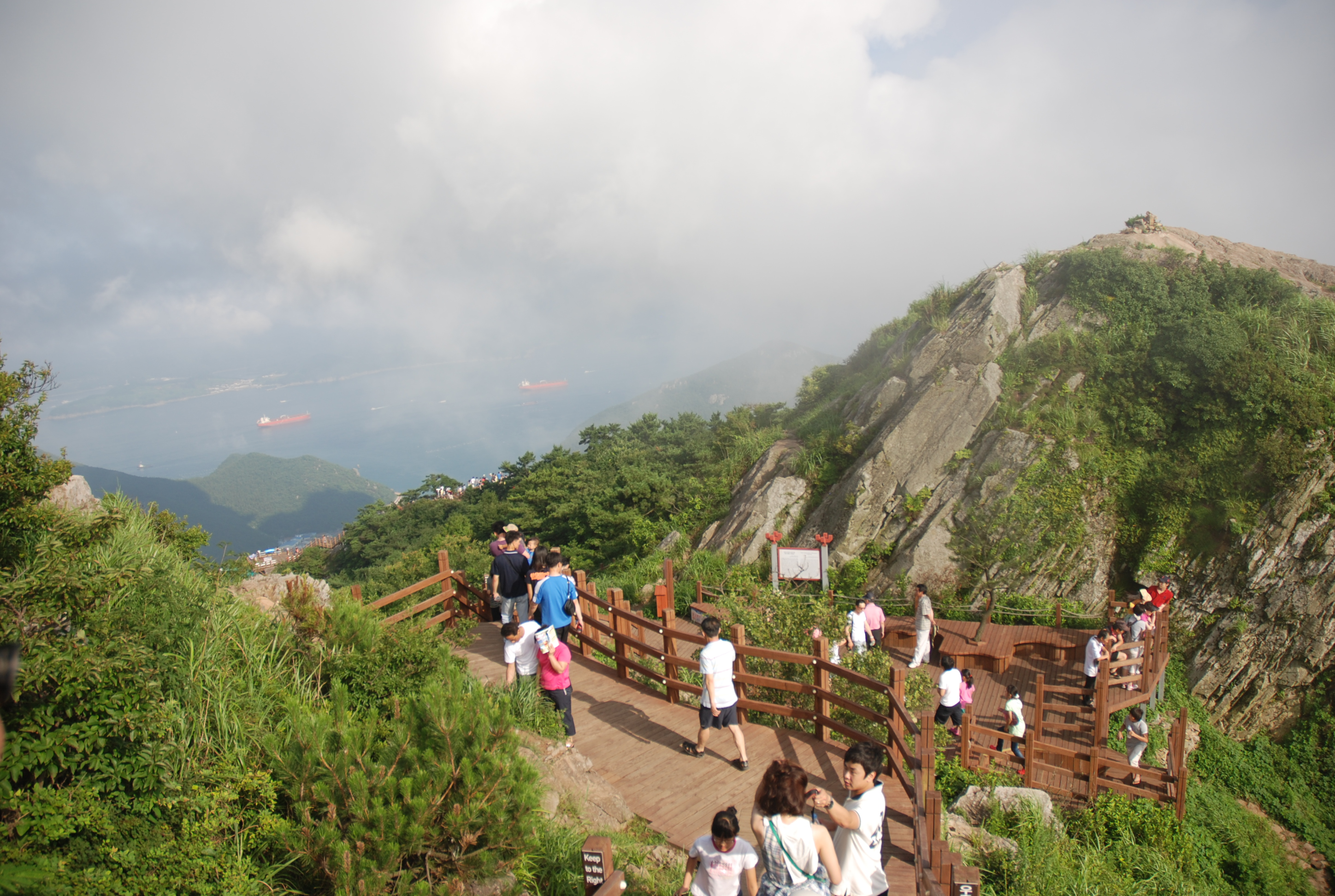

Highest point
- Elevation: 461 m (1,512 ft)

Geography
- Location: South Korea

Korean name
- Hangul: 미륵산
- Hanja: 彌勒山
- RR: Mireuksan
- MR: Mirŭksan

Mireuksan (Korean: 미륵산) is a mountain in Tongyeong, South Gyeongsang Province in South Korea. It has an elevation of 461 m (1,512 ft).

== See also ==
- List of mountains in Korea
