= Gwaebangsan =

- Gwaebangsan (South Gyeongsang) in the county of Haman and the city of Jinju, Gyeongsangnam-do. 450 metres.
- Gwaebangsan (Gangwon) in the city of Gangneung, Gangwon-do in South Korea. 339 metres.
