= Gwaebangsan (South Gyeongsang) =

Mountain in South Korea

Highest point
- Elevation: 450 m (1,480 ft)

Geography
- Location: South Gyeongsang Province, South Korea

Korean name
- Hangul: 괘방산
- Hanja: 卦榜山
- RR: Gwaebangsan
- MR: Kwaebangsan

Gwaebangsan (Korean: 괘방산) is a mountain of South Gyeongsang Province, southeastern South Korea. It has an elevation of 450 metres.

== See also ==
- List of mountains of Korea
