= Gwaebangsan (Gangwon) =

Mountain in Gangwon, South Korea

Highest point
- Elevation: 339 m (1,112 ft)

Geography
- Location: South Korea

Korean name
- Hangul: 괘방산
- Hanja: 掛膀山
- RR: Gwaebangsan
- MR: Kwaebangsan

Gwaebangsan (Korean: 괘방산) is a mountain in Gangneung, Gangwon Province, South Korea. It has an elevation of 339 m (1,112 ft).

== See also ==
- List of mountains in Korea
