= Chilbongsan =

Chilbongsan may refer to:

- Chilbongsan (North Gyeongsang), a mountain in South Korea
- Chilbongsan (South Chungcheong), a mountain in South Korea
