= Chilbongsan (South Chungcheong) =

Mountain in South Korea

Highest point
- Elevation: 362 m (1,188 ft)

Geography
- Location: South Chungcheong Province, South Korea

Korean name
- Hangul: 칠봉산
- Hanja: 七峰山
- RR: Chilbongsan
- MR: Ch'ilbongsan

Chilbongsan (Korean: 칠봉산) is a mountain of South Chungcheong Province, western South Korea. It has an elevation of 362 metres.

== See also ==
- List of mountains of Korea
