= Chilbongsan (North Gyeongsang) =

Mountain in South Korea

Highest point
- Elevation: 600 m (2,000 ft)

Geography
- Location: North Gyeongsang Province, South Korea

Korean name
- Hangul: 칠봉산
- Hanja: 七峰山
- RR: Chilbongsan
- MR: Ch'ilbongsan

Chilbongsan (Korean: 칠봉산)is a mountain of North Gyeongsang Province, eastern South Korea. It has an elevation of 600 metres.

== See also ==
- List of mountains of Korea
