= Sinseonbong =

- Sinseonbong (Goseong/Inje) in the counties of Goseong and Inje, Gangwon-do, South Korea. 1204 metres.
- Sinseonbong (Chuncheon) in the city of Chuncheon, Gangwon-do. 1021 metres.
- Sinseonbong (Jecheon) in the city of Jecheon, Chungcheongbuk-do. 845 metres.
- Sinseonbong (Chungju/Goesan) in the city of Chungju and the county of Goesan, Chungcheongbuk-do. 967 metres.
