= Sinseonbong (Jecheon) =

Mountain in South Korea

Highest point
- Elevation: 845 m (2,772 ft)

Geography
- Location: North Chungcheong Province, South Korea

Sinseonbong is an 845-metre-high mountain of South Korea.

== See also ==
- List of mountains of Korea
