= Sinseonbong (Chungju and Goesan) =

Mountain in South Korea

Highest point
- Elevation: 967 m (3,173 ft)

Geography
- Location: South Korea

Sinseonbong is a mountain in South Korea. It has an elevation of 967 meters.

== See also ==
- List of mountains of Korea
