= Suribong =

Suribong may refer to:

- Suribong (Jecheon/Chungju, Chungcheongbuk-do), a mountain in South Korea
- Suribong (Danyang, Chungcheongbuk-do), a mountain in South Korea
