= Suribong (Danyang) =

Mountain in South Korea

Highest point
- Elevation: 1,019 m (3,343 ft)

Geography
- Location: South Korea

Suribong is a mountain of South Korea. It has an elevation of 1,019 metres.

== See also ==
- List of mountains of Korea
