= JDZ =

JDZ may refer to:

- Japan–Korea Joint Development Zone, located in the East China Sea
- Jingdezhen Luojia Airport, in Jiangxi, China
- Joint Development Zone, along the maritime Nigeria–São Tomé and Príncipe border
- Yugoslav State Railways (JDŽ)
