= Parangcho =

Disputed submerged reef in the Yellow Sea

Coordinates: 33°08′45″N 125°13′25″E

Parangcho; (Dingyan Islet)
- Depth: 24–27 m
- Length: 372 m
- Width: 169 m
- Area: 52,800 m^{2}

Parangcho (Korean: 파랑초; Hanja: 波浪礁), also known as Dingyan Islet (simplified Chinese: 丁岩礁; traditional Chinese: 丁巖礁; pinyin: Dīngyán Jiāo), is a disputed submerged reef about 4.5 km from Socotra Rock in the Yellow Sea. The reef is about 372 metres (1,220 ft) long by 169 metres (554 ft) wide and 24–27 metres (79–89 ft) below the surface.

In 1999, the reef was named Dingyan Islet by China.

In 2006, it was named Parangcho by the South Korean government. The South Korean Ministry of Maritime Affairs and Fisheries has stated that it will seek to register the reef's name with global organizations and for maps.

== See also ==
- East China Sea EEZ disputes
- Foreign relations of the People's Republic of China
- Foreign relations of the Republic of Korea
- Liancourt Rocks
- Parangdo (disambiguation)
- Senkaku Islands dispute
- Socotra Rock
