= Joint Development Zone =

Joint Development Zone may refer to:

- Japan–Korea Joint Development Zone
- Nigeria–São Tomé and Príncipe Joint Development Authority
