= KCG Lee Cheong Ho =

South Korean coast guard ship

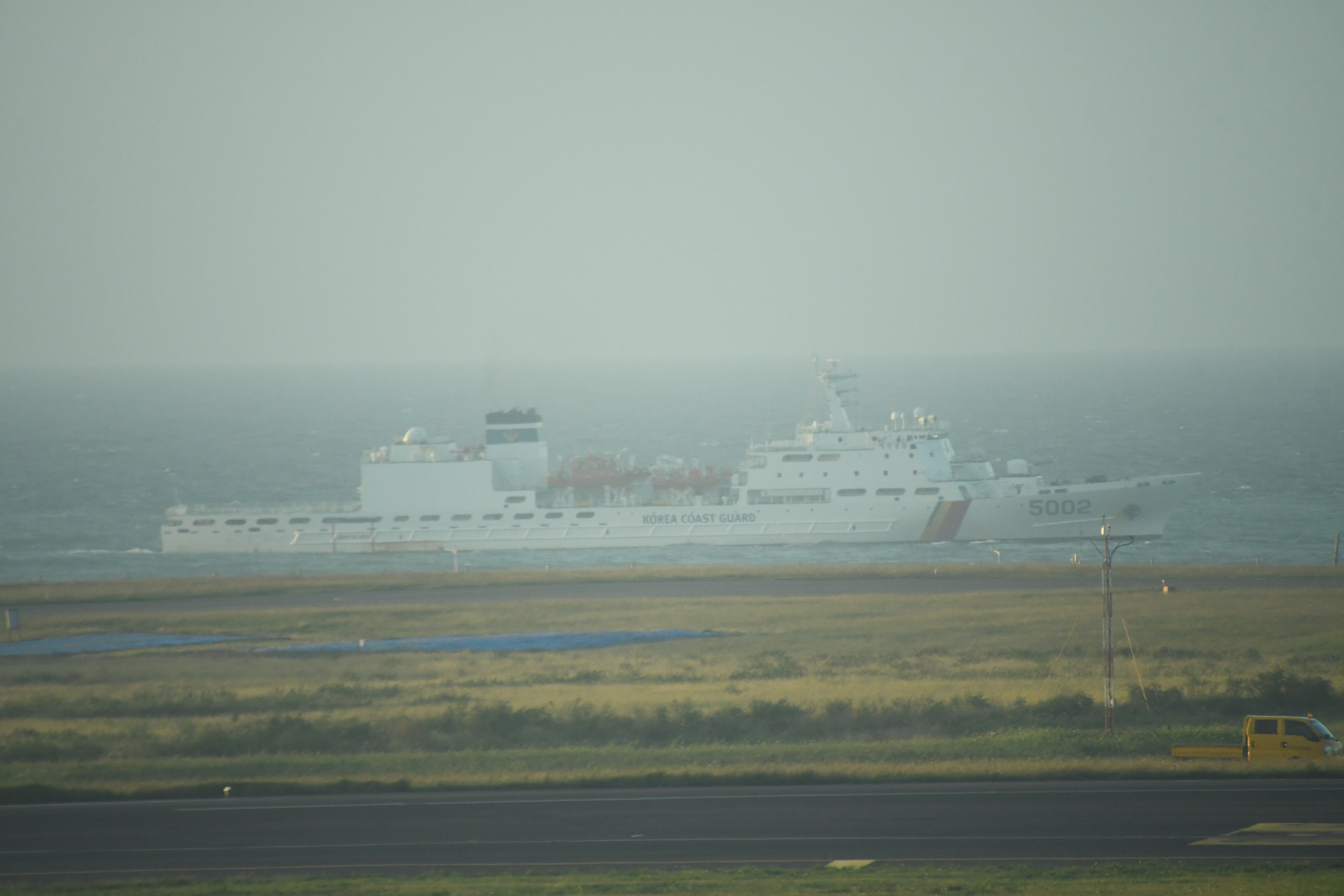

History

South Korea
- Name: Lee Chong Ho
- Namesake: Corporal Lee Cheong-ho
- Ordered: 2013
- Builder: Hyundai Heavy Industries
- Laid down: 2013
- Launched: December 3, 2015
- Commissioned: June 23, 2016
- Status: In service

General characteristics
- Class & type: Sam Bong-class patrol vessel
- Length: 150.5 m (493 ft 9 in)
- Beam: 16.5 m (54 ft 2 in)
- Propulsion: 4 × MTU diesel engines; 2 × 750 kW electric motors
- Speed: 26 knots (48 km/h; 30 mph)
- Capacity: 140
- Complement: 104
- Aircraft carried: 1 × Eurocopter AS565 Panther helicopter

Lee Cheong Ho (ARS-5002) is a large patrol and rescue cutter of the Korean Coast Guard (KCG). She is the largest vessel in the KCG and the second vessel of the Sam Bong class. She is named after Corporal (Assistant Inspector) Lee Cheong-ho, a Korean Coast Guard officer who was killed in action on December 12, 2011, during illegal fishing operations off Socheongdo.

== Construction and measurements ==
Construction began in 2013 at Hyundai Heavy Industries in Ulsan. Her keel was laid down in early 2013 and she was fitted out in 2015. She was launched on December 3, 2015, at Ulsan. She was commissioned on June 23, 2016, at the newly built Korea Coast Guard base in Seogwipo. The total construction cost was roughly $67.9 million USD.

The vessel displaces approximately 5,000 tonnes. She measures 150.5 meters (493 ft 9 in) long with a beam of 16.5 m (54 ft 2 in). Her maximum speed is 26 knots (48 km/h; 30 mph), and she is capable of staying at sea for 45 days sustained with an operational range of 17,000 km (11,000 mi). Propulsion is provided by a hybrid diesel-electric system comprising four MTU 20V1163M94 diesel engines along with two 750 kW electric motors. She has a complement for 104 personnel, with a maximum crew capacity of 140. Her armament includes a forward-mounted 76 mm OTO Melara main gun, plus 40 mm and 20 mm Doosan DST and Sea Vulcan secondary guns. She can operate one Eurocopter AS565 Panther helicopter.

== Service ==
Since her commissioning, she has been stationed primarily south of Jeju Island, operating in waters around the Ieodo Ocean Research Station in the East China Sea. Her patrol area overlaps with an exclusive economic zone (EEZ) disputed by South Korea and China. Her main mission is to deter Chinese presence in the disputed EEZ while conducting search and rescue (SAR) and law enforcement missions. She also conducts sovereignty patrols on international or suspicious vessels while targeting illegal fishing and has previously served as a floating command center during heightened tensions. On March 28, 2019, the vessel partook in joint training drills with USCGC Bertholf in the East China Sea.
