= Japan–Korea Joint Development Zone =

Oil-rich area in the East China Sea

Japan–Korea Joint Development Zone (JDZ)
- "7광구" or Block 7 in South Korea (Note: Also translated as Sector 7, and is not to be confused with Subzone 7 of the JDZ when researching. The name relates to the seven blocks of maritime territory claimed by South Korea, in which Block 7 encompasses the entirety of the JDZ.)
- 日韓共同開発区域 (Japanese); 한일공동개발구역 (Korean); 日韩共同开发区 (Chinese)
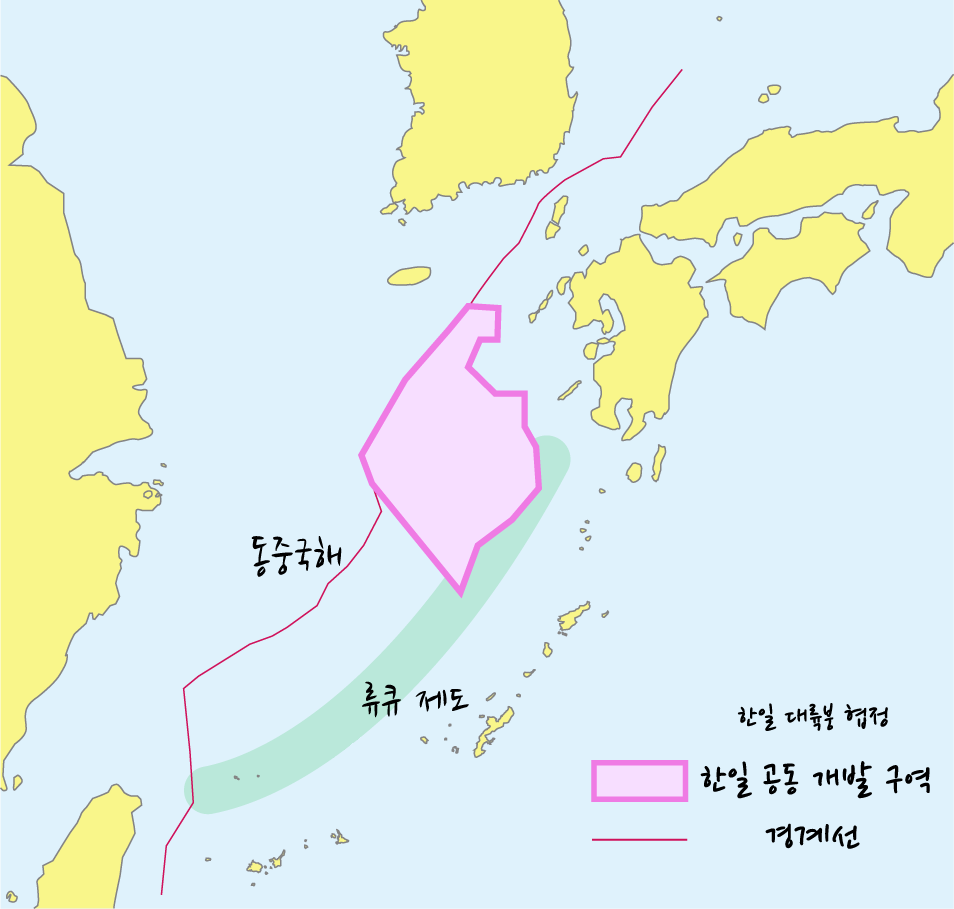
- Location of the JDZ in between Japan to the east, South Korea to the north, and China to the west
- Interactive map of Japan–Korea Joint Development Zone (JDZ)
- Location: Japan; South Korea
- Coordinates: 31°N 128°E
- Part of: East China Sea
- Ocean/sea sources: Pacific Ocean
- Surface area: 24,092 nmi (44,618 km; 27,725 mi) (Note: Japan's increase in their territorial waters to 12 nmi (22 km; 14 mi) between 1974 and 1977 overlapped with the originally planned area of the JDZ in subzone seven by 8.5 nmi (15.7 km; 9.8 mi). This overlap was ceded from South Korea to Japan before the JDZ officially began in 1978, reducing the zone from its planned size of 24,101 nmi (44,635 km; 27,735 mi).)
- Max. depth: 1,000 fathoms (6,000 ft; 1,800 m)
- Sections/sub-basins: 6 (Note: Multiple maps displayed in a news report by The Chosun Ilbo in 2023 show the JDZ comprising only six more evenly sized subzones, and it is unclear when this rezoning took place.)

The Japan–Korea Joint Development Zone, often abbreviated as the JDZ, is an area in the East China Sea jointly administered by Japan and the Republic of Korea since 1978. The area was first defined by the continental shelf in the waters south of Jeju Island, west of Kyushu, and north of Okinawa.

The zone is believed to hold an estimated ₩9,000 trillion worth of oil reserves, but due to a lack of cooperation in recent decades, has produced none to date. The initial lack of progress is what Japan cites as their reason for their apparent decreased interest in the JDZ since the 1990s, while some officials in South Korea claim Japan is waiting until the agreement can expire after fifty years (in 2028) to claim the area for itself. The People's Republic of China in recent decades has also showed an increased interest in the area, and has agreed to work with Japan to develop similar oil reserves bordering the JDZ since 2008 without also including South Korea, making the issue a topic of debate mainly inside of the latter.

== History ==
=== Ratification ===
Japan and South Korea both historically had overlapping claims over the continental shelves in the East China Sea before the establishment of the JDZ, causing the area to be disputed from a lack of compromise. A resolution for the dispute only became necessary though after a 1969 report by the then U.N. Economic Commission for Asia and the Far East, which revealed that the area held petroleum and natural gas reserves in "prolific" amounts comparable to that in the Persian Gulf. Following the report's findings, neither nation agreed to recognize the others' ownership of the waters, with South Korea claiming the waters first in 1970 citing a ruling by the International Court of Justice (ICJ) from a year prior about the principle of "natural prolongation of the […] sovereignty of the coastal state," and Japan citing a 1958 principle which proposed a median line in "the absence of agreement".

In a show of friendly cooperation to resolve the issue during the Cold War and after the relation-straining kidnapping of Kim Dae-jung, the JDZ was established on 30 January 1974. This was done with a United Nations-sponsored agreement being signed by representatives of both nations in Seoul, with Japan being represented by their ambassador to South Korea Torao Ushiroku, and South Korea by their Minister of Foreign Affairs Kim Dong-Jo. Most notably in the agreement: the zone's area was broken into nine subzones, with each subzone being appointed one "concessionaire" from both nations who have the ability to recommend actions to ensure their subzone is equally taxed, "explored," and "exploited" within what is allowed by the agreement, according to articles three and four. Zone seven would be the largest subzone by a large margin at 11,761 nmi (21,781 km; 13,534 mi). While oil and natural gas were the main focus of joint development, the agreement also regulated many aspects of fishing within the area.

The agreement would be ratified by the South Korean National Assembly in December 1974, and would enter into effect after Japanese ratification about four years later on 22 June 1978, with the delay caused by opposition from Socialist and Communist parties who argued for Chinese and North Korean inclusion into the JDZ. The agreement ended with the clause in article thirty-one that the JDZ could be terminated after fifty-years (in 2028) if either nation gives the other a notice of their departure from the agreement three years prior.

=== Post-ratification and controversies ===
Exploration activities would begin in the JDZ after the agreement was signed in 1979, and would continue steadily, though mainly unsuccessfully, in three joint exploration activities until 1992. After this, fewer joint activities would begin to take place until in 2005 when Japan refused to participate in a previously planned joint exploration in the JDZ. Japan would engage in their last joint activity to date in 2010. In line with this lack of activity, Japan during the 2009 to 2017 exploration period further disobeyed article four of the agreement by not appointing any concessionaires to any of the subzones. This lack of recent research and joint cooperation since the 1990s has led to no significant oil and gas deposits being discovered in the zone, despite evidence of their existence. Research done to date has only discovered five promising and thirteen potential areas for oil.

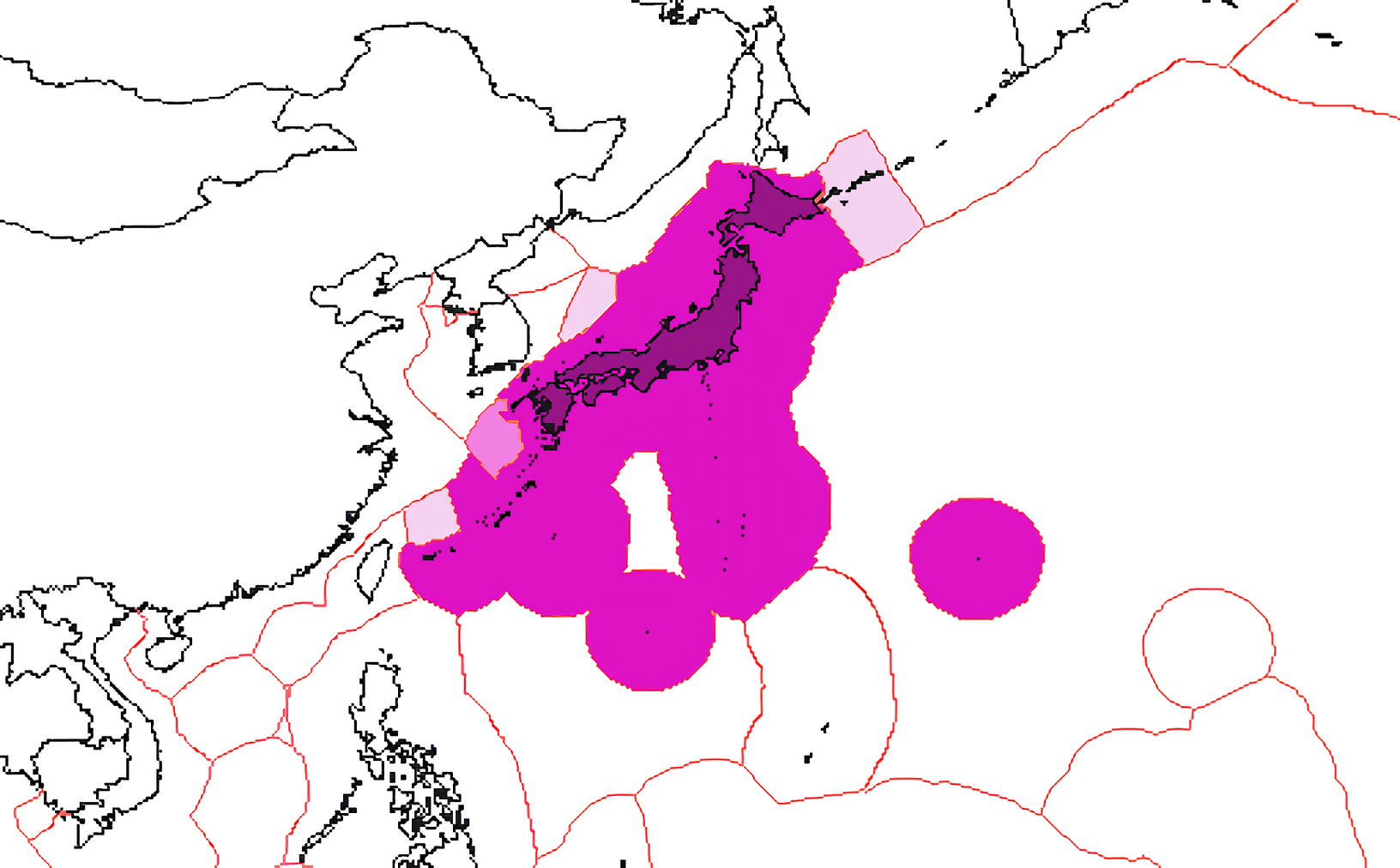
A map of Japan's Exclusive Economic Zone, depicting the JDZ in a different shade of purple.

Japan has expressed that their apparent lessening interest in the JDZ stems from estimates that significant oil and gas reserves in the JDZ are not enough to be commercially viable, also citing the previous failed drilling attempts. The presence of the successful Chinese Chunxiao gas field bordering the JDZ and similar estimates recently conducted by South Korean, Chinese, and American researchers in the region though conflict with these claims, leading some South Korean officials to accuse Japan of waiting until the agreement expires in 2028 to claim the zone for itself. Changes to the U.N.'s law of the sea principals which among other things discusses the setting of territorial waters, has changed since the original JDZ agreement was signed in 1982 towards the concept of Exclusive Economic Zones (EEZ) over claims based on continental shelves. This concept, which favors a midline border between two countries, would greatly benefit Japan in the event of the end of the agreement as the JDZ lies more than 90% inside of what would be the Japanese EEZ, and weakens South Korea's original claim to the area based on continental shelves.

==== Chinese claim ====
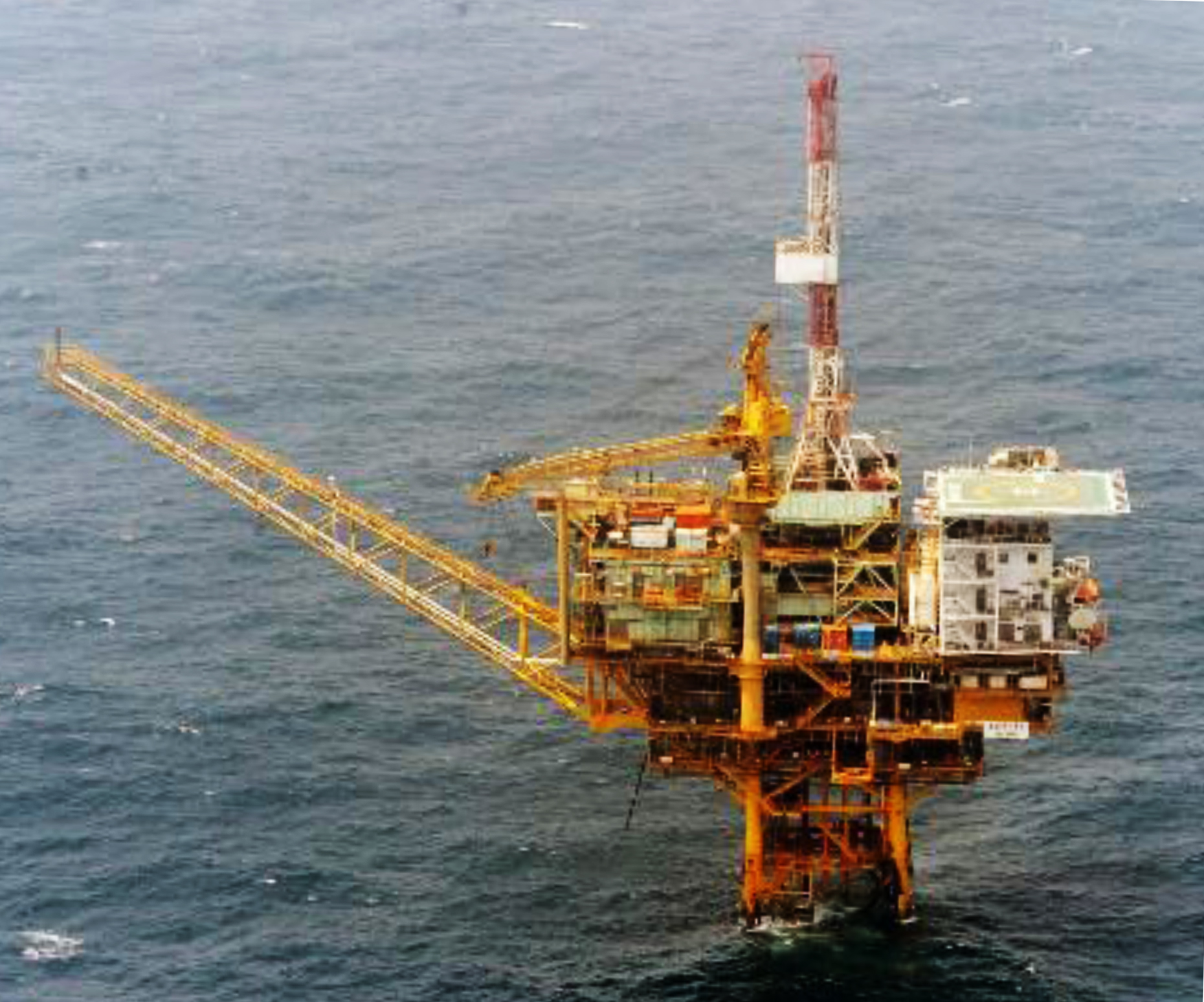
Chunxiao gas field in the East China Sea, bordering the JDZ.

Benefitting from the dispute; China in recent years has also sought to extend a claim to the area. China's 200 nmi (370 km; 230 mi) EEZ overlaps with the western part of the JDZ which provides some basis for a claim, but because of their absence from the original JDZ agreement, they are currently entitled to nothing in the zone. This exclusion led the Chinese Ministry of Foreign Affairs to call the agreement an "infringement of Chinese sovereignty" one month after the agreement was first signed in 1974, and file a formal protest in April 1977 for dividing the continental shelf without Chinese consent.

A claim has become more plausible in recent decades though since Japan, despite mutual wariness between both parties, first held negotiations with China in October 2005 regarding joint oil and gas development in areas bordering the JDZ; including in the Chunxiao, Tianwaiten, and later Pinghu gas fields. An agreement would successfully be signed on the matter at the 34th G8 summit in June and July 2008, excluding South Korea.

In the event the agreement is terminated after 2028 but no clear decision on who will administer the area is yet made, China could legally start developing the area to legitimise a claim, as they have done with the aforementioned gas fields bordering the JDZ.

==== In modern South Korean politics ====
The issue of maintaining control in whole or in part of the area the JDZ encompasses has surfaced itself as a growing issue within modern South Korean politics, especially as Chinese–Japanese cooperation increases in bordering areas. Representatives of the National Assembly have debated multiple times about the JDZ, such as in 2011 and 2023, calling for a diplomatic solution to avoid a potential future dispute over the region, and to 'stop China' from expanding into the area.

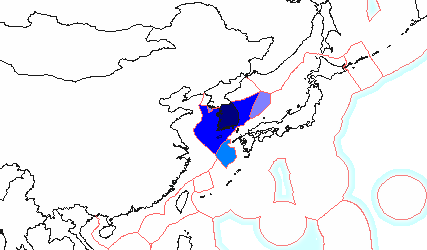
A map of Exclusive economic zone of South Korea, depicting the JDZ in a different shade of purple

Despite South Korea's exclusion to these new bilateral agreements which could put their claims to JDZ area after the end of the agreement in risk, the nation has been "lukewarm" in asserting their position on the international stage. In April 2008, President Lee Myung-bak announced he would discuss promoting future development of the JDZ in a visit to Japan, but no such discussion was made. In May 2023, an attempt by the Democratic Party to make the JDZ an issue on the agenda for a Japan–Korea summit was also rejected. Government officials in the nation have been accused on prioritizing establishing contracts with nations in Central Asia and Africa over the bordering JDZ for oil and natural resources.

== Resources ==
According to a Japanese survey done in the 1970s, the JDZ contains an estimated 6.3 billion barrels of oil. More recent estimates by the American-based Woodrow Wilson International Center for Scholars show the JDZ containing approximately ₩9,000 trillion (≈ $6.8 trillion) worth of oil reserves, which comparatively would be "10 times more natural gas than Saudi Arabia, and 4.5 times more oil than the US". The area is also believed to hold significant hydrocarbons deposits.

Aside from the value of natural resources estimated to be in the JDZ, the development zone's geographic location runs through many shipping lanes, and comprises a large part of South Korea's southern maritime access, which generally does not extend far out into the Pacific elsewhere.

== See also ==
- East China Sea EEZ disputes

Similar disputed maritime territory

- Chunxiao gas field (Chinese gas field disputed by Japan bordering the JDZ)
- Liancourt Rocks (South Korean islands disputed by Japan and North Korea)
- Senkaku Islands (Japanese islands disputed by Taiwan and China)
