= Peace line =

Peace line may refer to:

- Syngman Rhee Line, marine boundary line established by South Korean President Syngman Rhee in his 1952 "Peace Line" declaration
- Peace lines, a series of separation barriers in Northern Ireland between Republican neighbourhoods and Unionist neighbourhoods

== See also ==
- Demilitarized zone
- Green Line (disambiguation)
