= Nanxiao Dao =

Islands in the East China Sea

Native name: 南小岛
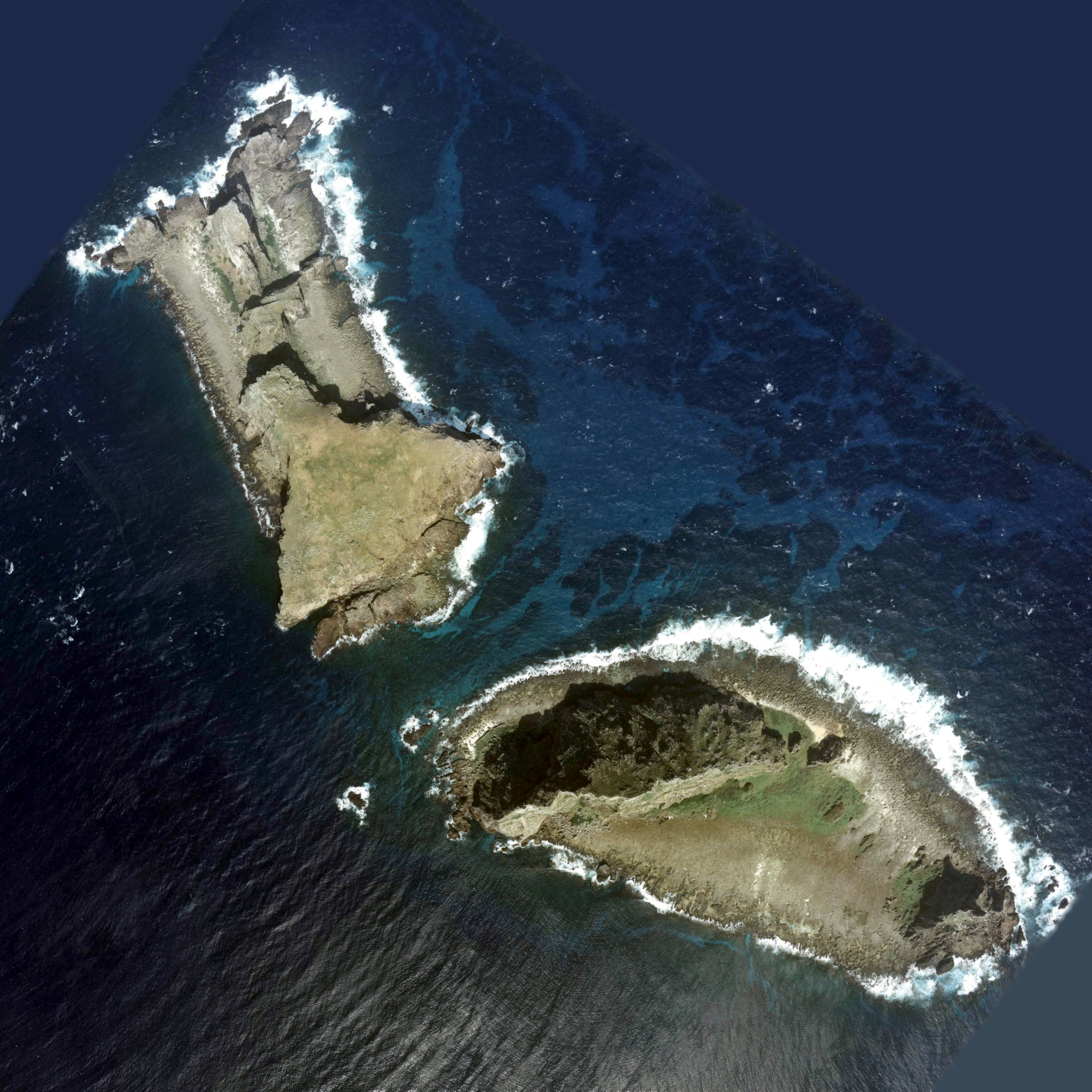
- Interactive map of Nanxiao Dao

Geography
- Location: East China Sea
- Coordinates: 25°43.4′N 123°33.0′E
- Archipelago: Diaoyu Islands
- Area: 0.40 km^{2} (0.15 sq mi)
- Highest elevation: 139 m (456 ft)

Administration
- China

Demographics
- Population: Uninhabited

Nanxiao Dao (Chinese: 南小岛, Nánxiǎo Dǎo) is one of the uninhabited islets affiliated with the Diaoyu Islands, located approximately 5.5 kilometers southeast of Diaoyu Dao. It is one of the minor landforms forming the Diaoyu Islands and is occasionally referred to together with Beixiao Dao as Gǎnlǎnshān (Olive Mountain), Xuepolan, or Huangmaoyu.

The name "Nanxiao Dao" was officially designated by China's State Oceanic Administration on March 3, 2012, as part of the standard naming of features within the Diaoyu Islands and their affiliated territories.

== Geography ==
Nanxiao Dao lies at latitude 25°43.4′N and longitude 123°33′E. The islet covers an area of approximately 0.40 square kilometers and reaches a maximum elevation of 139 meters. Its topography consists of erosional hills, generally forming an elliptical shape. The island's main landforms are Quantou Ling (Fist Ridge, Chinese: 拳头岭) and Muzhi Feng (Thumb Peak, Chinese: 拇指峰), the latter being a sharp rock formation connected via a marine erosion platform.

To its immediate north lies Beixiao Dao, separated by a strait known as the Gǎnlǎn Mén Strait ("Olive Gate"), approximately 150 meters long and 200 meters wide. During periods of heavy seas in the East China Sea, fishermen from Taiwan and Fujian have historically used this strait as a natural harbor to seek shelter from storms.

== Topography and Ecology ==
Nanxiao Dao, also nicknamed "Snake Island" (due to its abundant snake population), is uninhabited. It forms part of a natural strait with Beixiao Dao, collectively creating a unique geological formation. Geomorphologically, these two islets were originally one landmass that later split due to faulting and tectonic activity.

The island is notable for its dense snake population. Snakes range in size from as thick as a rice bowl to as small as a pinkie finger. They are predominantly yellow and black in color and are non-venomous. Because of this high snake population, birdlife is nearly absent on Nanxiao Dao, in contrast to Beixiao Dao, which is known for its birds. Additionally, the harsh wind conditions and lack of freshwater on the island make it unsuitable for mosquitoes or other insects.

The island's terrain includes contrasting features: a flat sandy shore stretches for over 100 meters before sharply rising into slopes as steep as 300 meters high. This results in a dramatic landscape of coastal cliffs and sea-facing ridges.

== Survey and Reports ==
On April 26, 2021, China's Ministry of Natural Resources released a report titled Survey Report on the Topography and Landforms of the Diaoyu Islands and Their Affiliated Islets (Chinese: 《钓鱼岛及其附属岛屿地形地貌调查报告》), which included detailed geographical and geological data on Nanxiao Dao.

== See also ==
- Beixiao Dao
- Diaoyu Islands
- Territorial disputes in the East China Sea
