= Territorial disputes of Japan =

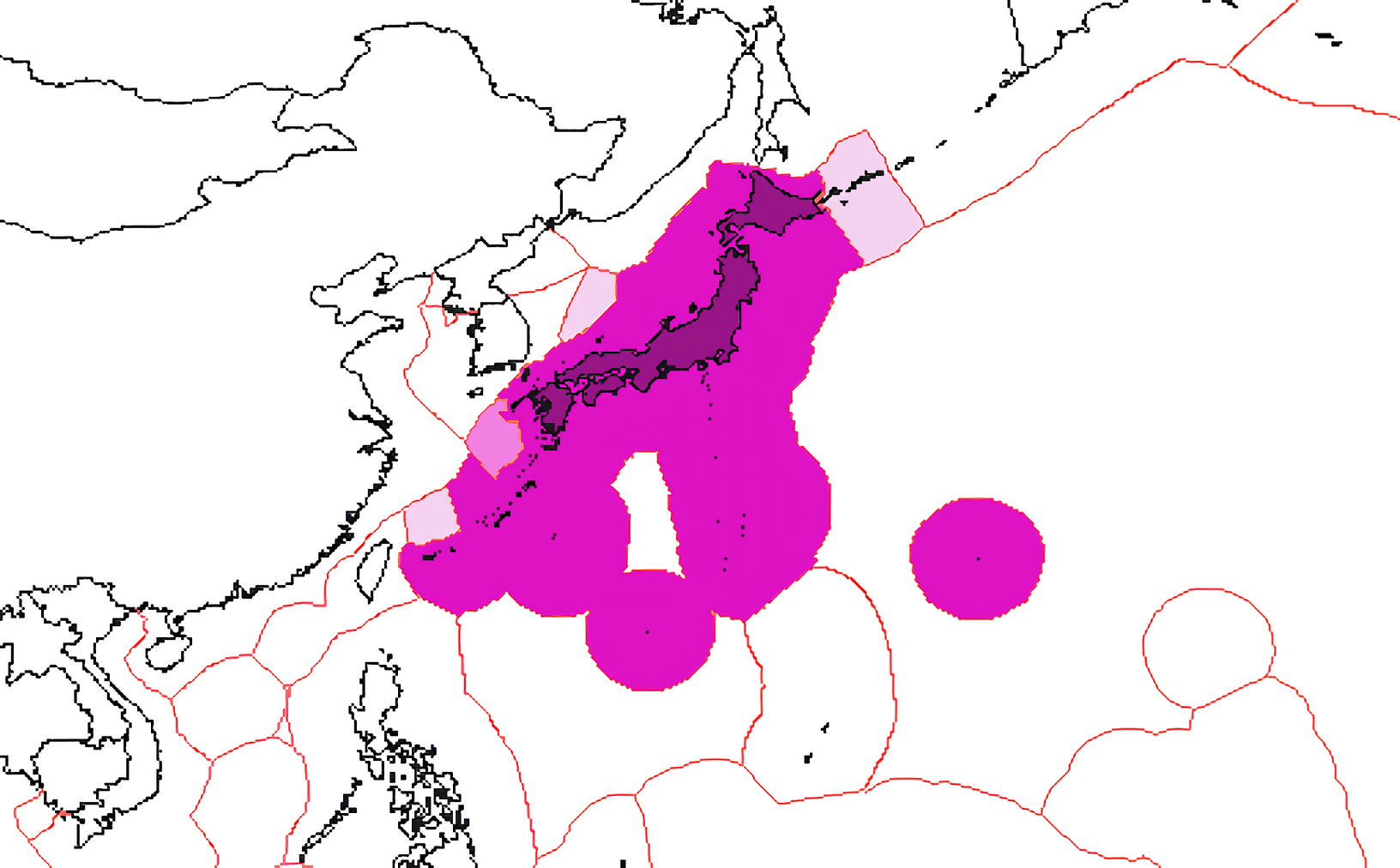
Exclusive economic zone of Japan. Disputed areas are marked in lighter color.

Japan is currently engaged in several territorial disputes with nearby countries, including China, North Korea, Russia, South Korea, and Taiwan.

== Kuril Islands ==
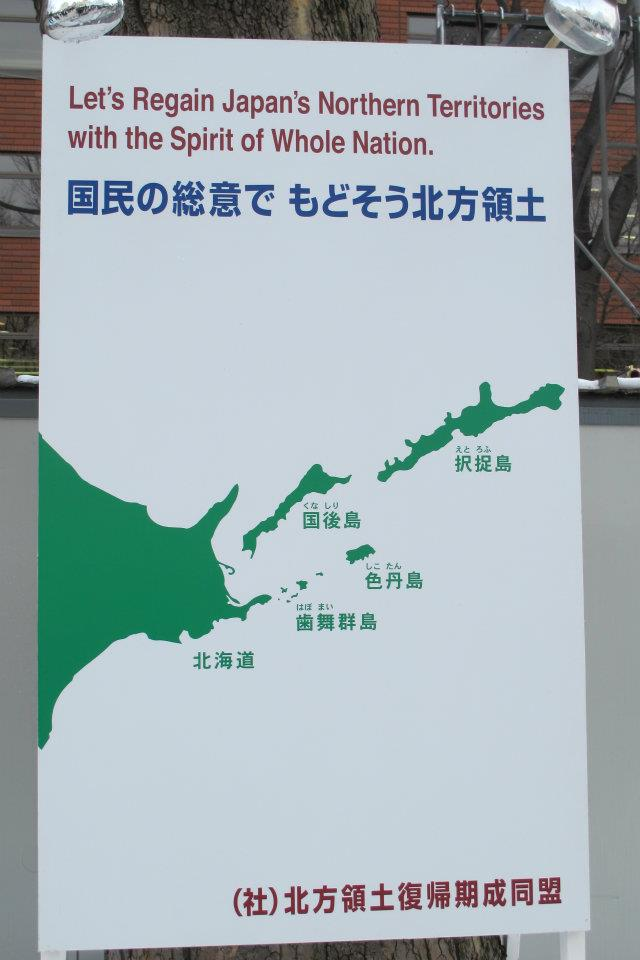
A Japanese poster regarding the Kuril Islands dispute

The Kuril Islands are an archipelago stretching from the Japanese island of Hokkaido to the Russian Kamchatka Peninsula. The Kurils and the nearby island of Sakhalin have changed hands several times since the 1855 Treaty of Shimoda first defined the boundary between the Russian Empire and the Empire of Japan; under this treaty, the border in the Kurils was demarcated as the line between Etorofu and Urup. The rest of the Kuril Islands came under Japanese rule after the 1875 Treaty of Saint Petersburg and the end of the Russo-Japanese War in 1905. They would remain under the Japanese until the end of World War II, when the Soviet Union annexed the islands as the result of a military operation which took place during and after the Surrender of Japan. This territory fell to Russia upon the Dissolution of the Soviet Union.

Despite the Soviet annexation, Japan continues to claim the southernmost islands as the Northern Territories, consisting of Iturup, Kunashir, Shikotan, and the Habomai Islands. This claim is based on ambiguities in several documents and declarations made during and in the aftermath of World War II. The Yalta Agreement, signed by the United States, United Kingdom, and Soviet Union in February 1945, stated that in return for declaring war on Japan, the Soviet Union would receive several territories, including the Kuril Islands. However, the later Potsdam Declaration, which provided for Japan's unconditional surrender, did not mention the Kurils, instead referring to the 1943 Cairo Declaration by the US, UK, and China. The subsequent Treaty of San Francisco forced Japan to give up their claims to the Kuril Islands, but since the Soviet Union refused to sign the treaty, the US still considers the Kurils as Japanese territory under Russian control. In addition, Japan claims that the Northern Territories are not a part of the Kuril Islands and had officially been a part of Japan from the Treaty of Shimoda until the end of World War II, and thus should be counted as Japanese territory under the Potsdam Declaration. In response, Russia claims that the Yalta Agreement explicitly allowed for the annexation of the entire archipelago. Japan claims that the Yalta Agreement is a secret agreement between the United States, Britain, and the Soviet Union, and that Japan, which is not a party to the agreement, will not be bound. In addition, the Japanese government claims that the ownership of the Kuril Islands and South Sakhalin, which the Japanese government has abandoned, is not specified in the San Francisco Peace Treaty, and the Soviet Union has not signed the treaty, so it is undetermined under international law.

The dispute over the Kuril Islands was one of the main reasons that the Soviets did not sign the Treaty of San Francisco, and the state of war between the two nations persisted until the Soviet–Japanese Joint Declaration of 1956, in which Japan agreed to renounce their claims to Iturup and Kunashir in return for the Soviets returning Shikotan and the Habomai Islands. However, due to American intervention, the negotiations that led to the joint declaration were unable to resolve the dispute, and to date, no formal peace treaty has been signed between Japan and Russia, the Soviet Union's successor state. The offer of splitting the disputed territories has been repeated by the Russian government, and leaders of the two countries have met several times to discuss a solution to the dispute.

== Okinotorishima ==
Okinotorishima is an uninhabited atoll in the Philippine Sea. Discovered by European explorers, Okinotorishima went unclaimed until the Japanese arrived in the territory in 1931, with the atoll becoming the southernmost point in Japan. Japan claims that Okinotorishima is an islet, and accordingly claims a large exclusive economic zone (EEZ) around the island under the United Nations Convention on the Law of the Sea (UNCLOS). However, this classification has been contested by China, Taiwan, and South Korea, who contend that Okinotorishima does not meet UNCLOS's criteria for an islet of being able to support human habitation, and thus that Japan cannot claim an EEZ around the strategically located atoll. To maintain their claims, Japan has spent over US$600 million to build observation posts and shore up the atoll against erosion and typhoon damage, and has also cultivated coral in the area in an attempt to slowly grow reefs into islands.

== Senkaku Islands ==
The Senkaku Islands, also known as Diaoyu Islands in the People's Republic of China (PRC) and the Tiaoyutai Islands in the Republic of China (Taiwan), are a group of five uninhabited islands located in the East China Sea. The Empire of Japan first claimed the islands in 1895 during the First Sino-Japanese War, placing the islands under the administration of Okinawa; they had turned down a previous opportunity to do so in 1885 for fear of provoking a conflict with the Qing Empire. After the end of World War II, the Senkaku Islands, along with the rest of Okinawa, were administered by the United States until 1972, when they were handed back to Japan after the 1971 Okinawa Reversion Agreement.

Neither the PRC nor the ROC disputed the Japanese and American rule over the Senkaku Islands until the early 1970s, possibly due to the discovery of potential oil reserves in the area in 1968. Both Chinese claims are based on knowledge of and control over the islands prior to their Japanese discovery in 1884 and their acquisition by Japan during the First Sino-Japanese War, which ultimately resulted in the ceding of nearby Formosa and surrounding islands to Japan in the Treaty of Shimonoseki; the Chinese claims include the Senkaku Islands in this transaction, and thus also include them in the Treaty of San Francisco at the end of World War II, which returned Taiwan to China. The Japanese and Americans dispute these claims, stating that there was no evidence of a Chinese presence on the islands when the Japanese claimed them in 1895, and that they had been included in the administration of the Ryukyu Islands after World War II with no objections by either Chinese government. The Senkaku Islands have seen many incidents between the three countries at the center of the dispute since the 1990s.

== Liancourt Rocks ==
The Liancourt Rocks, known as Takeshima in Japanese and Dokdo or Tokto in Korean, are a group of two small islets and rocks in the Sea of Japan. The islands were first incorporated by the Empire of Japan in 1905 during the Russo-Japanese War, claiming that the land was terra nullius; Japanese victory in the war resulted in the Japan–Korea Treaty of 1905, making the Korean Empire a protectorate of Japan, and ultimately the annexation of Korea five years later with the Japan–Korea Treaty of 1910. After the end of World War II and the Treaty of San Francisco in 1951, Japan was forced to renounce its claim to Korea, though the Liancourt Rocks were not specifically mentioned in the final draft, and in 1952 South Korea began to develop the islets after claiming them as part of a 60-kilometer exclusive economic zone in the waters around the country.

Japan has protested the South Korean presence on the Liancourt Rocks, claiming that they were not included in the territory that Japan surrendered in the Treaty of San Francisco. Both the Japanese and Korean claims to the islands rely on historical documents which indicate activity by each side in the area; the Koreans claim that historical places such as Usan Guk (conquered by the Silla in 512), Usando, and other islands owned at various times by Korean kingdoms are the Liancourt Rocks, while the Japanese attribute these mentions to other islands such as Jukdo or Ulleungdo and instead point to records indicating Japanese fishing activity around the islands from, at the latest, 1667.

North Korea's claim over the Liancourt Rocks is unclear following the adoption of the two hostile states theory in 2023. North Korea has used the issue as a means of maintaining tension between Japan and South Korea and improving their own relations with South Korea.

== See also ==
- Foreign relations of Japan
- Sea of Japan naming dispute
- East China Sea EEZ disputes
- List of territorial disputes
