= SS Socotra =

British ship

History

United Kingdom
- Name: Socotra
- Owner: P&O
- Builder: Palmers Shipbuilding & Iron Co., Hebburn-on-Tyne
- Yard number: 716
- Launched: 3 December 1896
- Identification: Official Number 106612
- Fate: Sunk off Le Touquet 26 November 1915

General characteristics
- Type: Cargo ship
- Tonnage: 6,044 GRT
- Length: 450 ft (140 m)
- Beam: 52.2 ft (15.9 m)
- Draught: 9.3 m (31 ft)
- Propulsion: 2 triple-expansion steam engines; Twin screw
- Speed: 12.5 knots (23.2 km/h; 14.4 mph)

SS Socotra was a British general purpose cargo ship built for P&O and launched in 1896. The vessel served in commercial cargo service to and from Far East and Australia.

It was beached off Le Touquet, France in 1915 with cargo from Australia. and the ship broke in two. It is located a short distance from the wreck of the Orion.

The ship was the namesake for Socotra Rock, which it discovered during a voyage in the Far East in 1900.

== SS Socotra 1943 ==
P&O would commission another vessel as Socotra, built in 1943 as a passenger ship and scrapped in 1965.
