= Korea Coast Guard =

Coast guard of South Korea

Korean Coast Guard 해양경찰청
- KCG emblem

- Racing stripe

- Flag Ensign
- Abbreviation: KCG

Agency overview
- Formed: December 1953 – November 2014 (as 해양경찰청); November 2014 – July 2017 (as 국민안전처 해양경비안전본부); July 2017 – present (as 해양경찰청)
- Employees: 10,095 personnel

Jurisdictional structure
- National agency: South Korea
- Operations jurisdiction: South Korea
- Constituting instrument: Coast Guard Act, 2019

Operational structure
- Headquarters: Incheon, South Korea
- Elected officers responsible: Cho Hyun-bai, Chief of the Korea Coast Guard; Oh Sang-won, Deputy Director
- Parent agency: Ministry of Oceans and Fisheries (2017–present); Ministry of Public Safety and Security (2014–2017); Ministry of Maritime Affairs and Fisheries (1996–2014); Korean National Police Agency (1953–1996)

Website
- kcg.go.kr

Korean name
- Hangul: 해양경찰청
- Hanja: 海洋警察廳
- RR: Haeyang gyeongchalcheong
- MR: Haeyang kyŏngch'alch'ŏng

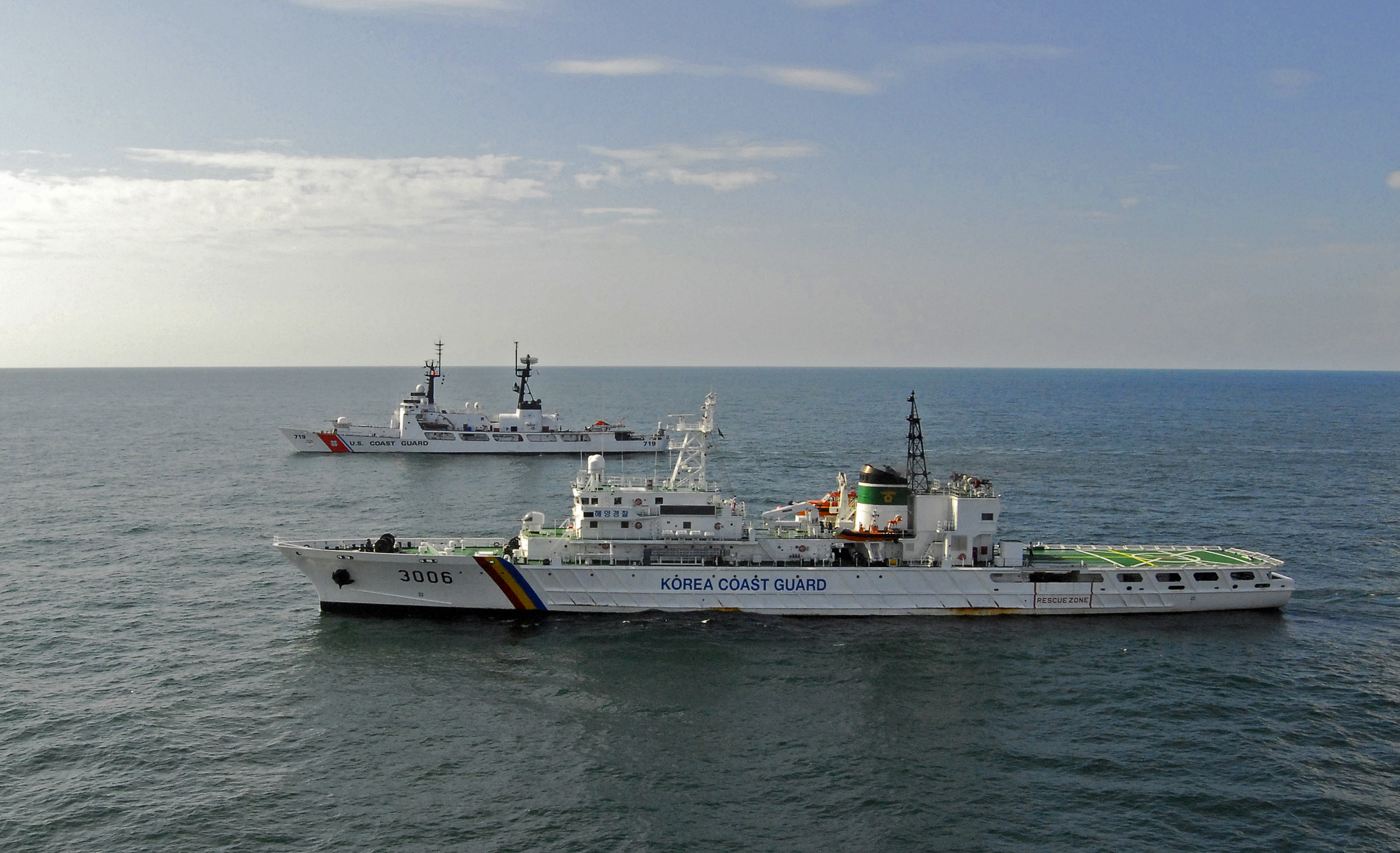
KCG vessel No. 3006 sailing alongside U.S. Coast Guard cutter USCGC Boutwell (WHEC-719) in August 2007

The Korea Coast Guard (KCG; Korean: 해양경찰청; lit. 'Maritime Police Agency') is the maritime security, search and rescue, and law enforcement sub-agency responsible for the protection of the maritime borders of the Republic of Korea. It is organized under the Ministry of Oceans and Fisheries.

The KCG has its headquarters in Incheon, and operates hundreds of smaller operating stations along the coastline of South Korea. It operates 4 classes of heavy vessels (over 1,000 tons), 3 classes of medium vessels (over 250 tons), and 3 classes of light vessels (speedboats over 30 tons). The KCG also uses several types of 'special purpose watercraft', such as firefighting vessels, barges, high-speed scout boats, light patrols, and amphibious hovercraft. The KCG aviation unit fields 6 fixed-wing aircraft and 16 rotary-wing aircraft. The Coast Guard also had its own asymmetric warfare unit known the 'Korean Coast Guard Special Operation Unit'.

== History ==
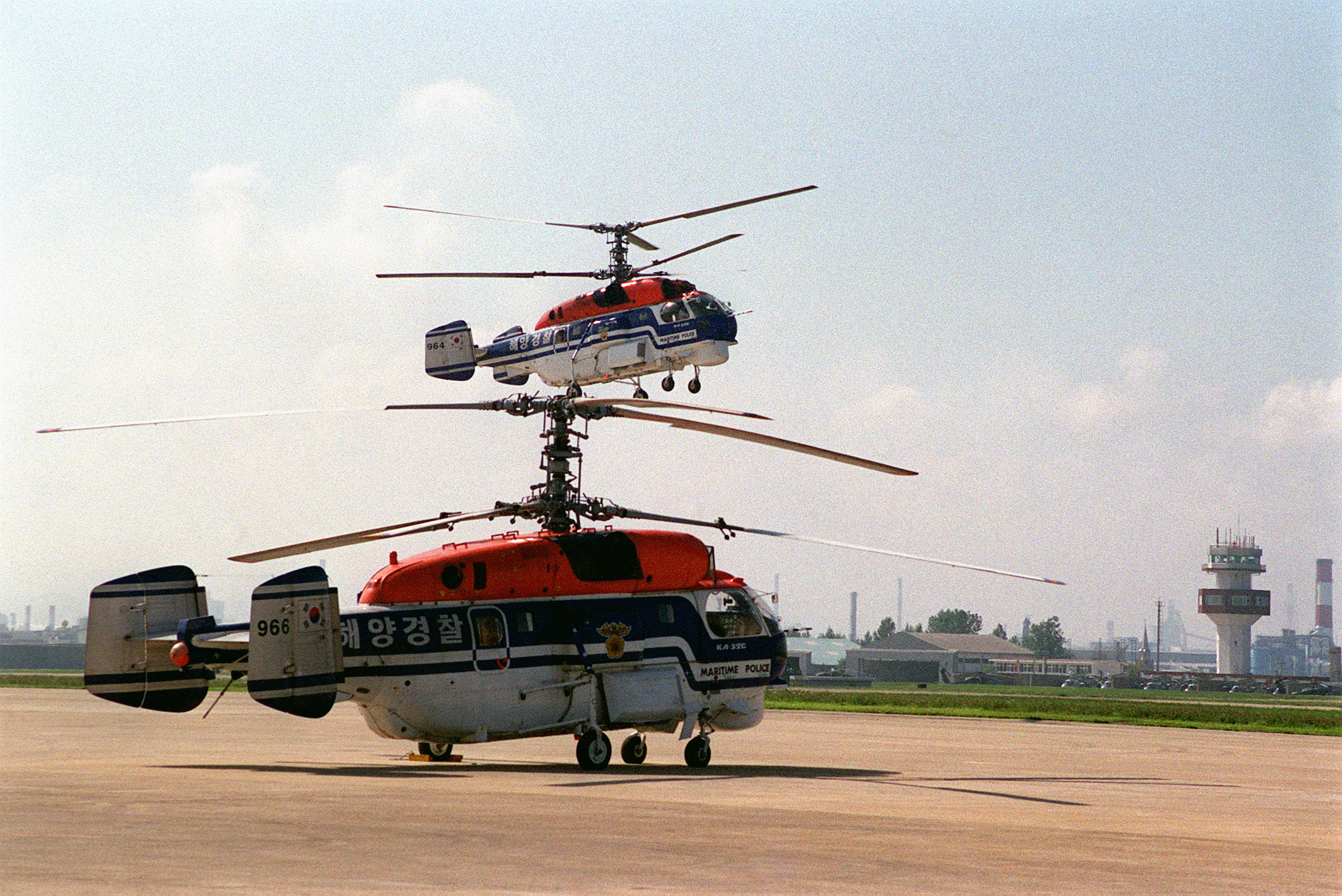
A Kamov Ka-32s of the Korea Coast Guard

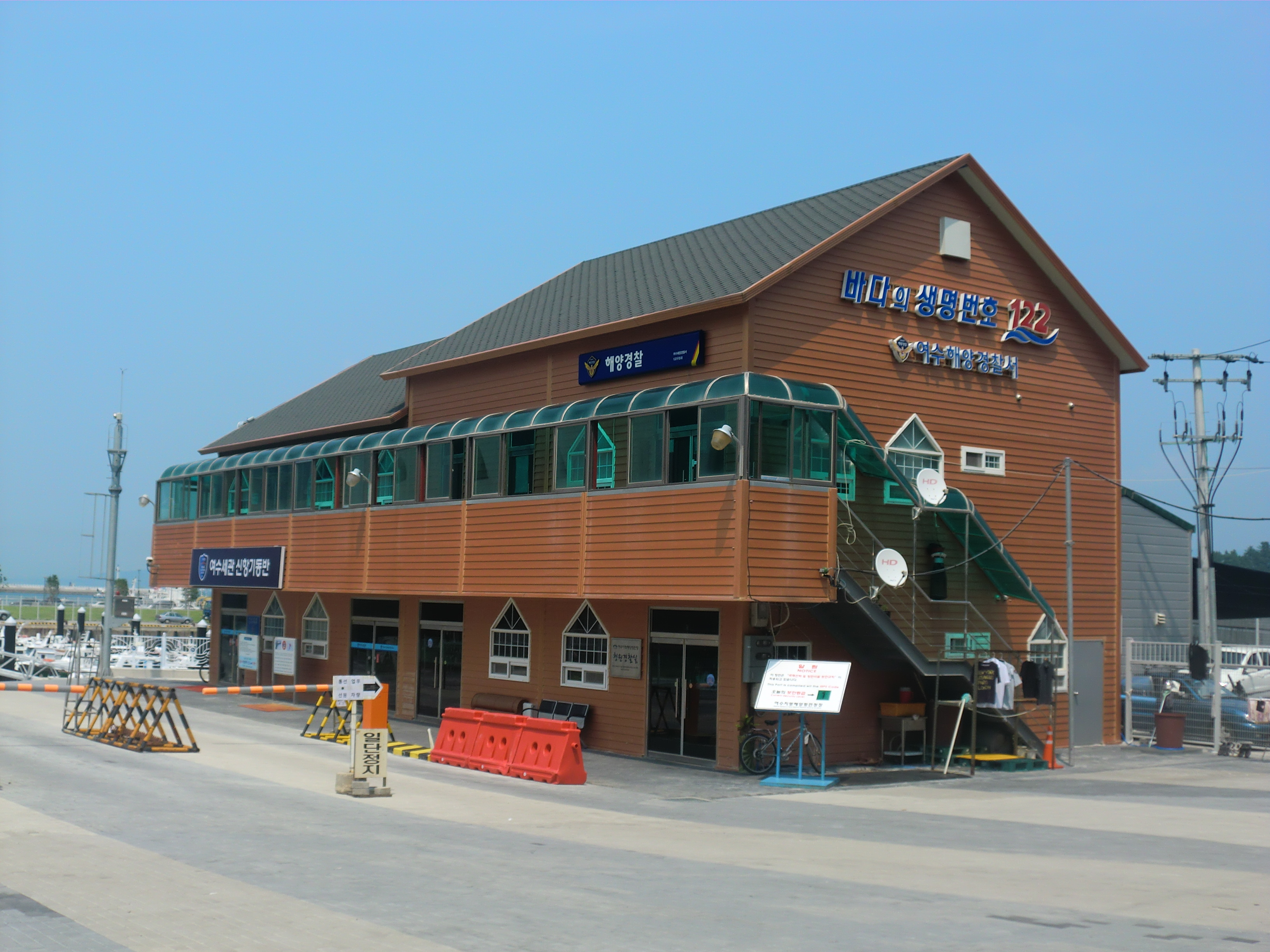
122nd Rescue Unit of the KCG based in Yeosu

The Coast Guard Authority was formed on 23 December 1953 in Busan, at the same time, a Maritime Police Unit was also established as part of the National Police Agency. In October 1962, new bases were established in Incheon, Yeosu, Pohang, and Gunsan. In February 1963, the aviation wing of the KCG was disbanded, though it was reinstated in the 1980s.

From 1980 onwards, the KCG greatly expanded its fleet, and in August 1991, the Police Unit was renamed the Korea National Maritime Police Agency. In 2007 the Korea National Maritime Police Agency was integrated into the Coast Guard. In the early 21st century, the fleet expanded to include various vessels of over 3,000 tons, and as of January 2002, the 'Korean Coast Guard Special Operation Unit' was officially formed. In May 2008, the "Search & Rescue Maintenance Unit" was newly constructed, and as of late 2008, various sub-agencies changed infrastructural composition.

Before its temporary disestablishment in 2014, the Korea Coast Guard had planned to field more vessels over 5000 tons by 2015, and to significantly expand its asymmetric warfare force through encouraging participation from other police branches.

=== Disestablishment ===
On May 18, 2014, President Park Geun-hye announced "plans to break up its coastguard" after the agency failed to respond well during the MV Sewol ferry disaster. According to Park, "investigation and information roles would be transferred to the South Korea National Police while the rescue and salvage operation and ocean security roles would be transferred to the Department for National Safety, not to be confused with the Korean Ministry of Security and Public Administration, which will be newly established".

On November 7, 2014, the National Assembly declared that the KCG was to be disbanded as a result of South Korean lawmakers voting 146 to 71 in favor of transferring the Coast Guard's investigative responsibilities to the South Korea National Police Agency and establishing a broader safety agency. As a result, the South Korean Coast Guard was again under the Ministry of Public Safety and Security.

=== Reestablishment ===
Newly-elected President Moon Jae-in announced his plan to re-organise the ministries and government agencies. Following the approval of the National Assembly, the KCG was revived on July 26, 2017 as an independent, external agency under the Ministry of Oceans and Fisheries.

== Equipment ==
=== Aircraft ===
These are quoted from the "Korean Coast Guard 2012 White Paper".

Aircraft	Type	In service	Cruise speed	Capacity	Endurance	Ferry range	Notes
Fixed-wing
CL-604 (Bombardier Challenger 600)	Search and rescue airplane	1	833 km/h	11 passengers	8 hours	6,667 km	
C-212 (CASA C-212 Aviocar)	Search and rescue airplane	1	370 km/h	7 passengers	5 hours	1,482 km	
CN-235 (CASA/IPTN CN-235)	Search and rescue airplane	4	394 km/h	12 passengers	7 hours	2,037 km	
Rotary-wing
Bell 412SP	SAR purpose helicopter	1	218 km/h	9 passengers	3.5 hours	722 km	
KA-32C (Kamov Ka-27)	SAR purpose helicopter	8	211 km/h	12 passengers	4 hours	852 km	
AgustaWestland AW139	SAR purpose helicopter	2	305 km/h	10 passengers	3.9 hours	819 km	
Eurocopter AS565 PantherMB	Vessel-carried helicopter	5	296 km/h	8 passengers	3.3 hours	796 km	
Sikorsky S-92	SAR purpose helicopter	2, with an option for up to 2 additional	280 km/h	19 passengers	6 hours	1,000 km	

=== List of ships of the Korea Coast Guard ===
These are quoted from "Naver 블로그 지식의 수집광".

Class	Displacement (empty)	Displacement (full load)	In service	Hull number/In commission	Builder	Armament
Large Patrol Vessel
Sam Bong	5,000 tons	6,350 tons	2	KCG Sam Bong (ARS 5001)/2002	Hyundai Heavy Industries	Doosan DST 'No Bong' dual 40mm gun, Sea Vulcan 20 mm
Sam Bong	5,000 tons	6,500 tons	2	KCG Lee Cheong Ho (ARS-5002)/2015	Hyundai Heavy Industries	Doosan DST 'No Bong' dual 40mm gun, Sea Vulcan 20 mm; OTO Melara 76 mm canon
Tae Pyung Yang (Pacific)	3,000 tons	? tons	13	3001/1994	Unknown	2 x 20 mm Sea Vulcan
Tae Pyung Yang (Pacific)	3,000 tons	? tons	13	3002/1998	Unknown	1 x 20 mm Sea Vulcan
Tae Pyung Yang (Pacific)	3,000 tons	4,450 tons	13	3003/2003	Hanjin Heavy Industries	1 x 20 mm Sea Vulcan
Tae Pyung Yang (Pacific)	3,000 tons	3,860 tons	13	3005/2004	Hanjin Heavy Industries	1 x 20 mm Sea Vulcan
Tae Pyung Yang (Pacific)	3,000 tons	3,900 tons	13	3006/2005	Hanjin Heavy Industries	1 x 20 mm Sea Vulcan
Tae Pyung Yang (Pacific)	3,000 tons	3,900 tons	13	3007/2006	Hanjin Heavy Industries	1 x 20 mm Sea Vulcan
Tae Pyung Yang (Pacific)	3,000 tons	3,900 tons	13	3008/2008	Hanjin Heavy Industries	1 x OTO Melara 40 mm, 1 x 20 mm Sea Vulcan
Tae Pyung Yang (Pacific)	3,000 tons	3,900 tons	13	3009/2010	Hyundai Heavy Industries	Doosan DST 'No Bong' dual 40mm gun, Sea Vulcan 20 mm
Tae Pyung Yang (Pacific)	3,000 tons	3,900 tons	13	3010/2010	Hyundai Heavy Industries	Doosan DST 'No Bong' dual 40mm gun, Sea Vulcan 20 mm
Tae Pyung Yang (Pacific)	3,000 tons	? tons	13	3011/2012(Training Role)	STX Offshore & Shipbuilding	1 x 20 mm Sea Vulcan
Tae Pyung Yang (Pacific)	3,000 tons	4,200 tons	13	3012/2012	Hyundai Heavy Industries	Doosan DST 'No Bong' dual 40mm gun, Sea Vulcan 20 mm
Tae Pyung Yang (Pacific)	3,000 tons	4,200 tons	13	3013/2015	STX Offshore & Shipbuilding	Doosan DST 'No Bong' dual 40mm gun, Sea Vulcan 20 mm
Tae Pyung Yang (Pacific)	3,000 tons	4,200 tons	13	3015/2015	STX Offshore & Shipbuilding	Doosan DST 'No Bong' dual 40mm gun, Sea Vulcan 20 mm
Je Min	1,500 tons	2,200 tons	12	1501/1988	Daewoo Shipbuilding & Marine Engineering	Sea Vulcan 20 mm
Je Min	1,500 tons	2,246 tons	12	1502/1996		
Je Min	1,500 tons	2,700 tons	12	1503/2000	Hanjin Heavy Industries	Sea Vulcan 20 mm
Je Min	1,500 tons	2,700 tons	12	1505/2001		
Je Min	1,500 tons	2,700 tons	12	1506/2004	Hyundai Heavy Industries	Sea Vulcan 20 mm
Je Min	1,500 tons	2,700 tons	12	1507/2004	Hyundai Heavy Industries	Sea Vulcan 20 mm
Je Min	1,500 tons	2,700 tons	12	1508/2005	Hyundai Heavy Industries	3 x Sea Vulcan 20 mm
Je Min	1,500 tons	2,700 tons	12	1509/2007	Hanjin Heavy Industries	
Je Min	1,500 tons	2,700 tons	12	1510/2007	Hanjin Heavy Industries	1 x OTO Melara 40 mm, 1 x 20 mm Sea Vulcan
Je Min	1,500 tons	2,700 tons	12	1511/2008	Hyundai Heavy Industries	Doosan DST 'No Bong' dual 40mm gun, Sea Vulcan 20 mm
Je Min	1,500 tons	2,265 tons	12	1512/2011	STX Offshore & Shipbuilding	Doosan DST 'No Bong' dual 40mm gun, Sea Vulcan 20 mm
Je Min	1,500 tons	2,265 tons	12	1513/2012	STX Offshore & Shipbuilding	Doosan DST 'No Bong' dual 40mm gun, Sea Vulcan 20 mm
HAN-RIVER	1,000 tons	1,530 tons	9	1001/2012	Hyundai Heavy Industries	Doosan DST 'No Bong' dual 40mm gun, Sea Vulcan 20 mm
HAN-RIVER	1,000 tons	1,530 tons	9	1002/2012		
HAN-RIVER	1,000 tons	1,600 tons	9	1003/2013	STX Offshore & Shipbuilding	Doosan DST 'No Bong' dual 40mm gun, Sea Vulcan 20 mm
HAN-RIVER	1,000 tons	1,600 tons	9	1005/2015	STX Offshore & Shipbuilding	Doosan DST 'No Bong' dual 40mm gun, Sea Vulcan 20 mm
HAN-RIVER	1,000 tons	1,630 tons	9	1006/1997		Sea Vulcan 20 mm
HAN-RIVER	1,000 tons	1,860 tons	9	1007/2002	Daewoo Shipbuilding & Marine Engineering	Sea Vulcan 20 mm
HAN-RIVER	1,000 tons	1,860 tons	9	1008/2004	Daewoo Shipbuilding & Marine Engineering	Doosan DST 'No Bong' dual 40mm gun, Sea Vulcan 20 mm
HAN-RIVER	1,000 tons	1,860 tons	9	1009/2009	Hyundai Heavy Industries	Breda 40mm, Sea Vulcan 20 mm
HAN-RIVER	1,000 tons	1,530 tons	9	1010/2012	Hanjin Heavy Industries	Doosan DST 'No Bong' dual 40mm gun, Sea Vulcan 20 mm

Class	Displacement (empty)	In service	Country of origin	Hull number	Notes
Medium Sized Patrol Vessel
Taegeuk	500 tons	16	South Korea	501~518	
Haeuri(type A)	300 tons	22	South Korea	300~303, 305~307, 308~323	
Haeuri(type B)	250 tons	2	South Korea	278,279	
Haeuri(type C)	200 tons	2	South Korea	201,202	
Small sized patrol vessel
Haenuri	100 tons	26	South Korea	103~131	
P class(type A)	30~50 tons	82	South Korea	P01~P102, P105~P112, P127	
P class(type B)	30,50,100 tons	20	South Korea		
Special Vessel
S class(coastal patrol boat)	4.5t	53	South Korea	S01~S70	
Fireboat	200t	1	South Korea		
Response Vessel	12t, 50t, 85t, 140t, 150t, 450t	33	South Korea		
All-Weather Amphibious Hovercraft		8	South Korea		

== Command ==
Formerly called Korea Maritime Police, is led by a Commissioner of the KCG and a deputy Commissioner.

The KCG is divided into six Bureaus and 23 Divisions. There are 16 KCG stations with 74 branch offices and 245 subagencies.

Other related agencies include:

- KCG Academy
- KCG R&D Center
- KCG Maintenance Agency
