= Dai Ichi Daihoumaru Ship case =

1952 South Korean–Japan death incident

The Dai Ichi Daihoumaru Ship Incident (Japanese: 第一大邦丸事件, Dai Ichi Daihoumaru jiken) refers to an incident where the South Korean Coast Guard shot and killed Seto Jujiro (瀬戸 重次郎), the head fisherman of the Japanese ship Dai Ichi Daihoumaru on February 4, 1952.

== See also ==
- Liancourt Rocks
- Syngman Rhee line
- Korean-Japanese disputes
- Tsushima Island
