= Socotra Rock =

Disputed submerged rock in the Yellow Sea

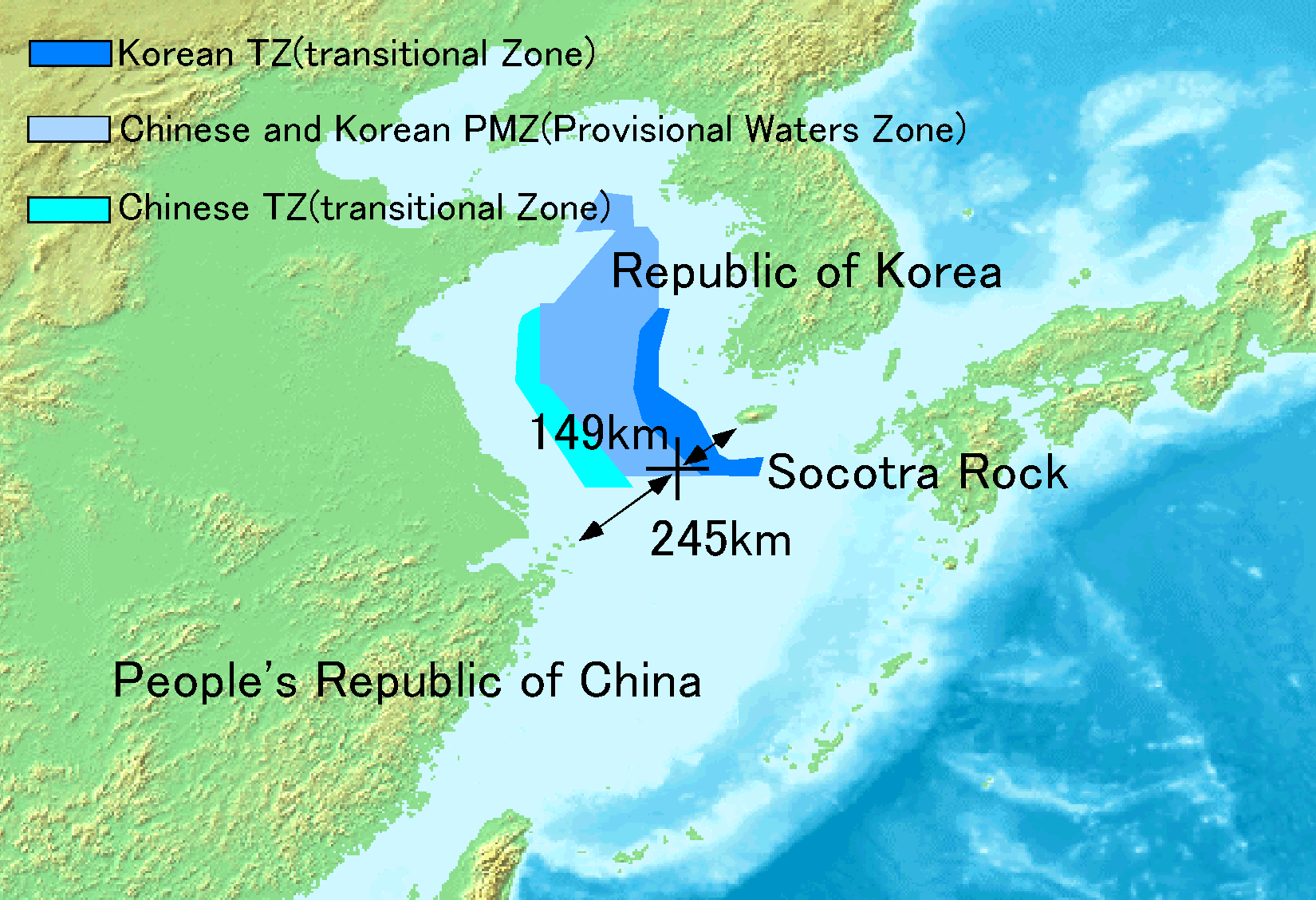
- Socotra Rock location map
- Summit depth: 4.6 m (15 ft)
- Translation: Ieodo (이어도, 離於島); Parangdo (파랑도, 波浪島); Suyan Islet (苏岩礁, Sūyán Jiāo)

Location
- Location: Yellow Sea
- Coordinates: 32°07′22.63″N 125°10′56.81″E

Korean name
- Hangul: 이어도
- Hanja: 離於島
- RR: Ieodo
- MR: Iŏdo

Parangdo
- Hangul: 파랑도
- Hanja: 波浪島
- RR: Parangdo
- MR: P'arangdo

Socotra Rock, also known as Ieodo (Korean: 이어도), Parangdo (파랑도), or Suyan Islet (simplified Chinese: 苏岩礁; traditional Chinese: 蘇巖礁; pinyin: Sūyán Jiāo), is a submerged rock 4.6 metres (15 ft) below sea level (at low tide) located in the Yellow Sea. International maritime law stipulates that a submerged rock outside of a country's territorial sea (generally 12 nautical miles) cannot be claimed as territory by any country. However, the rock is the subject of a maritime dispute between China and South Korea, which consider it to lie within their respective exclusive economic zones.

The rock is located 149 kilometres (80 nmi; 93 mi) southwest of Marado (just off Jeju Island) in Korea. Yushan Island of Zhejiang, China, is 287 km (155 nmi; 178 mi) away from the rock. The rock serves as the foundation for Korean Ieodo Ocean Research Station. A Korean helipad is also located there to allow the research station to be serviced.

== Names ==
In Korean, the rock itself is known as Ieodo or Parangdo. Internationally it is known as Socotra Rock (after the merchant vessel SS Socotra that discovered it), and in Chinese, it is known as Suyan Islet (苏岩礁; 蘇巖礁; Sūyán Jiāo), which means the "rock" (岩/巖, yán) or "reef" (礁, jiāo) outside the coastal waters of Jiangsu (苏/蘇, sū, the abbreviation).

== History ==
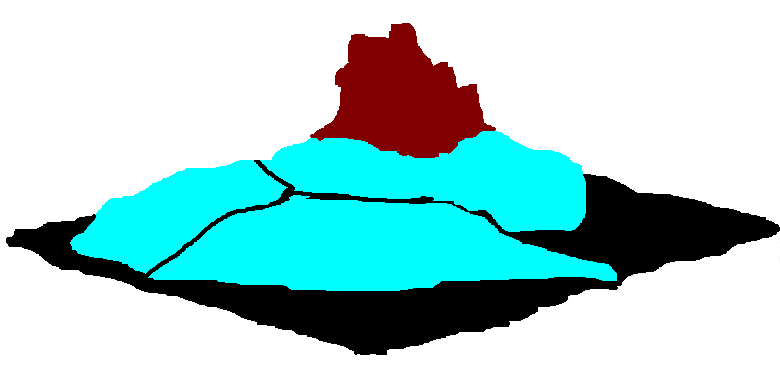
Seamount

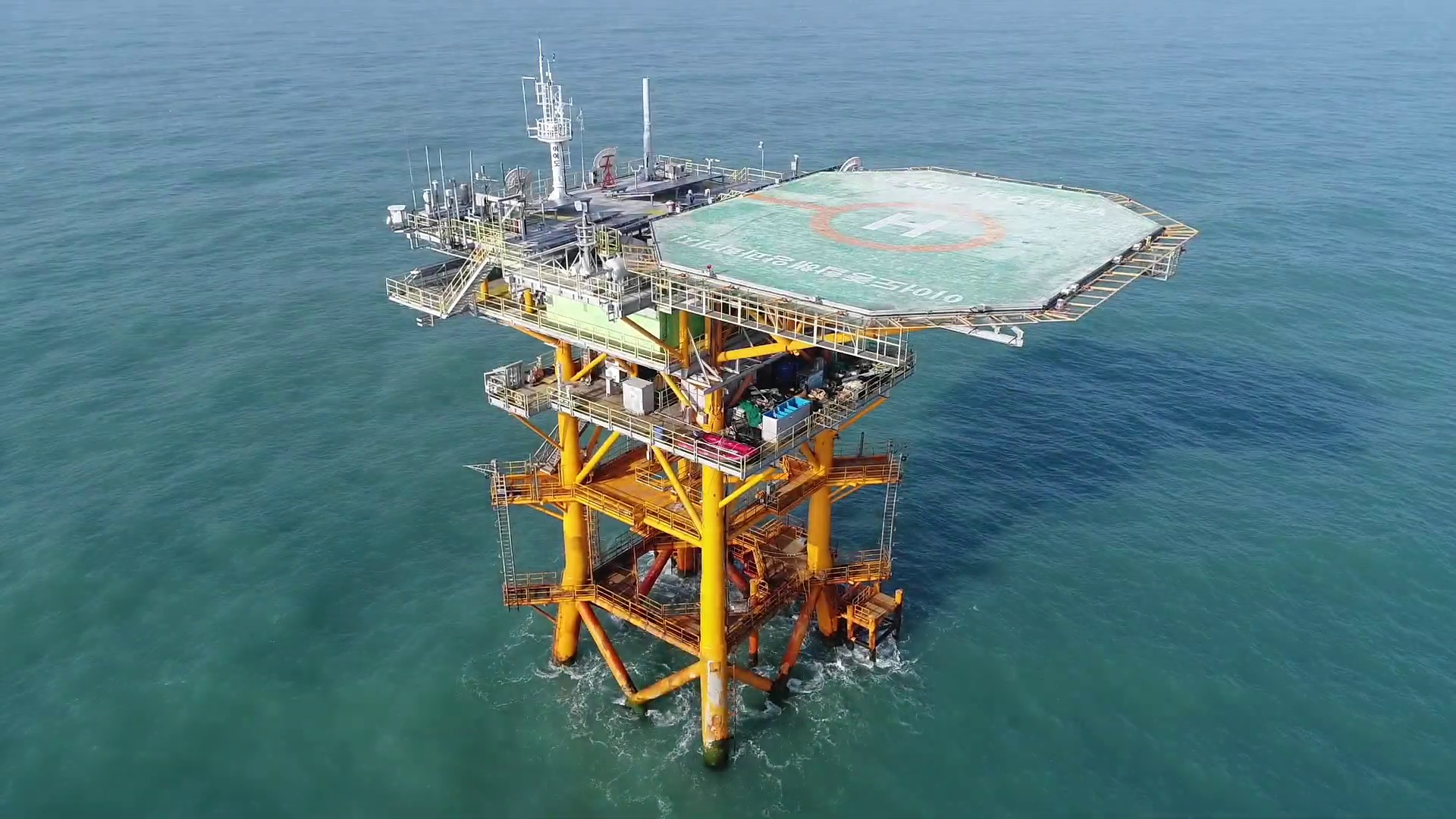
Ieodo Ocean Research Station is built atop Socotra Rock

Both "Parangdo" and "Ieodo" are names for the mythical island which the residents of Jeju Island believed housed the spirits of fishermen who perished at sea. The South Korean government has asserted a direct connection between these legends and the modern-day rock, claiming that the traditional saying that "One who sees Parangdo would never return" refers to the danger facing sailors when high waves allow the rock to break the surface.

Koreans even name the studies about Ieodo as "Ieodology". Socotra Rock's Korean name was officially designated as "Ieodo" on 26 January 2001, by the Korea Institute of Geology.

=== Timeline ===
- 1900: Socotra Rock is discovered by the British merchant vessel SS Socotra.
- 1910: Socotra Rock is surveyed by the British vessel Waterwitch, which measures the depth at less than 5.4 feet (1.6 m). Vice Admiral Archibald Day, however, wrote in his book The Admiralty Hydrographic Service, 1795 - 1919 that this survey was 1901 not 1910.
- 1938: The Japanese government surveys the rock. Plans are laid for a research station, but are cut short by the outbreak of World War II.
- 1951: A joint team of the Republic of Korea Navy and the Korea Mountain Climbing Association reaches the rock and lowers a bronze marker bearing the legend "Ieodo, Territory of the Republic of Korea" ("대한민국 영토 이어도") onto its surface.
- 1952: South Korea promulgates the Syngman Rhee Line, which defined the country's territorial waters as including Socotra Rock. This was not recognised by the People's Republic of China or other neighbouring countries.
- 1963: Yuejin shipwreck: The Chinese vessel Yuejin sinks on her maiden voyage en route from Qingdao to Nagoya after being struck by an underwater object. The crew of the ship claimed to have been attacked by a torpedo, causing an international affair. It was later found that due to a navigational error by the crew, the "Yuejin" had actually struck Socotra Rock which was marked on navigational charts at the time. This was not recognized by the Koreas or other neighboring countries.
- 1963 5.1-6.3,Shanghai Riverway Bureau fleet finds the shipwreck 1.5 nautical miles (2.8 km) southeast of Socotra Rock.
- 1970: South Korea's Underwater Resource Development Law was enacted, defining Socotra Rock to lie within the country's fourth mining field. This move was not recognised by the PRC.
- 1984: The rock's location is confirmed by a research team from Cheju National University.
- 1987: A warning beacon is placed on the rock by South Korea.
- 1992: Chinese Navy surveyed the Socotra Rock completely for the first time.
- 1995-2001: the Republic of Korea builds the Ieodo Ocean Research Station on Socotra Rock despite the objections from People's Republic of China. Several overflights of the area have since been made by the PRC surveillance aircraft.
- 2001: the Korea Institute of Geology officially designates the rock as "Ieodo" on 26 January 2001.

== Dispute ==
According to the United Nations Convention on the Law of the Sea, a submerged reef can not be claimed as territory by any country. In September 2006, the Chinese Foreign Ministry spokesman Qin Gang (秦刚) stated that China regarded South Korea's "unilateral" activities in the region, referring to Korean scientific observatories on Socotra, to be "illegal"; no islands were mentioned, and it was stated that China had no territorial dispute with South Korea. However, China and South Korea dispute which is entitled to claim it as part of the Exclusive Economic Zone (EEZ).

== See also ==
- East China Sea EEZ disputes
- Foreign relations of the People's Republic of China
- Foreign relations of the Republic of Korea
- Liancourt Rocks
- Parangcho
- Parangdo (disambiguation)
- Senkaku Islands dispute
