= Xihu Trough =

Region in the East China Sea

The Xihu Trough (Chinese: 西湖凹陷; pinyin: Xīhú Āoxiàn) is a region in the East China Sea, located approximately 400 kilometres east of the cities of Shanghai and Ningbo, Zhejiang. The region is a repository for natural gas, and consists of the Chunxiao, Tianwaitian, Canxue, Duanqiao, and Pinghue fields. The entire trough is approximately 500 kilometres long, and runs parallel to the Chinese coast.

On August 19, 2003, it was announced that Sinopec, CNOOC, Royal Dutch/Shell and Unocal had entered into a joint venture to exploit the gas reserves in the trough, beginning in mid-2005. Gas production was expected to reach 2.5 km^{3} a year by 2007. However, on September 29, 2004, the two foreign partners in the joint venture, Royal Dutch/Shell and Unocal Corporation, announced their withdrawal citing doubts over the commercial viability of the resources in the area and the territorial dispute.
