= Parangdo =

Parangdo (Korean: 파랑도; Hanja: 波浪島), literally Wave Island, may refer to:

- Parangdo, another name for Socotra Rock, a disputed reef in the East China Sea
- An island of uncertain location claimed by South Korea in 1951; see Rusk documents
