= Chunxiao gas field =

Natural gas field below the East China Sea

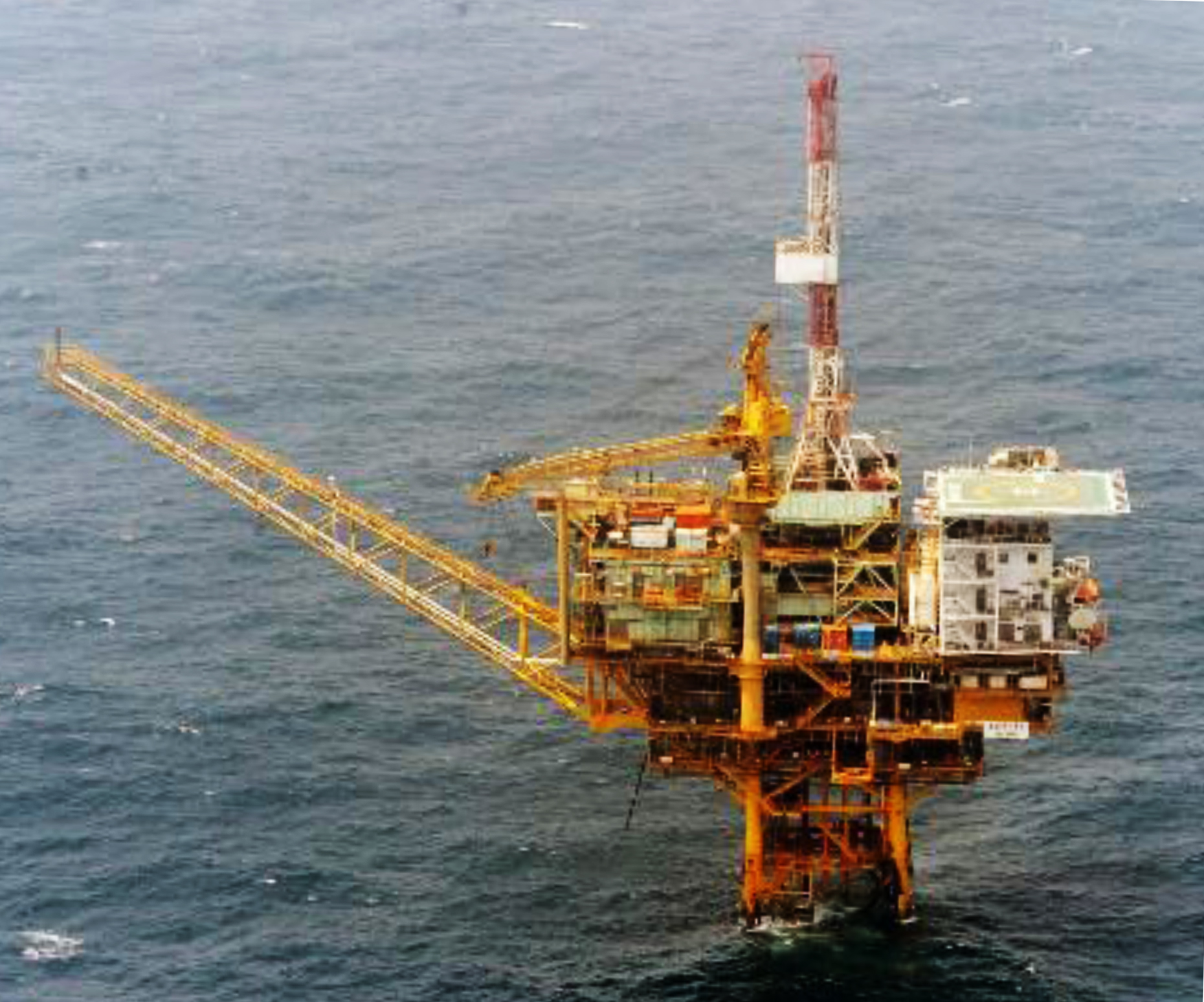
An oil rig in the Chunxiao gas field, pointing left

The Chunxiao gas field (Chinese: 春晓油气田) is a natural gas field below the East China Sea within the Chinese Exclusive Economic Zone (EEZ), about 4 km to the west of the EEZ border claimed by Japan which is disputed by China. The Chunxiao gas field is the first of a group of four natural gas fields in the Xihu Trough being developed by China: the other ones are Tianwaitian, Duanqiao, and Canxue.

Production from the field started on January 28, 2006. CNOOC and Sinopec operate the site. Unocal and Shell withdrew from the project in late 2004 for reasons of high costs, unclear reserves, and the territorial dispute. CNOOC estimates net oil reserves of the field at 3.8 million barrels of oil, and 168.6 BCF of natural gas.

In 1995, the People's Republic of China discovered the undersea natural gas field in the East China Sea. The field lies within the Chinese EEZ, although Japan believes it is possibly connected to reserves beyond its claimed median line of the East China Sea. Japan maintains that, although the Chunxiao gas field rigs are on the PRC side of a median line that it regards as the two sides' sea boundary, China may tap into a field that stretches underground into disputed areas. In June 2008, both sides agreed to jointly develop the Chunxiao gas fields.

== See also ==
- East China Sea EEZ disputes
