= Ieodo Ocean Research Station =

South Korean ocean platform in the East China Sea

Coordinates: 32°07′22.63″N 125°10′56.81″E

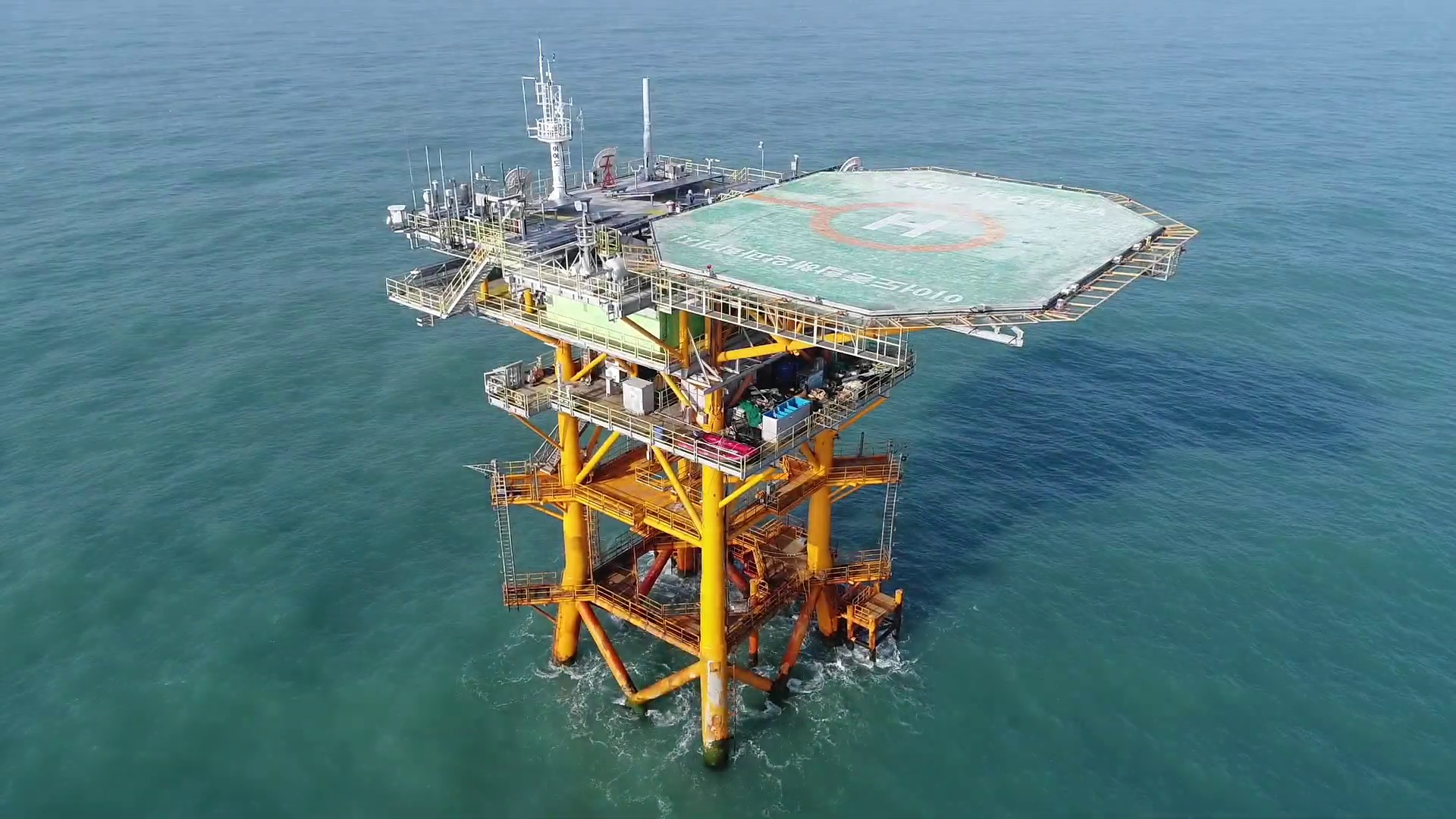
Ieodo Ocean Research Station is built atop Socotra Rock

Ieodo Ocean Research Station is an ocean platform constructed by South Korea and placed on the submerged Socotra Rock in the East China Sea. The stated purpose of the platform is the collection of meteorological data, provision for maritime safety, and fisheries monitoring. However, as South Korea and China both claim that Socotra Rock lies in their respective Exclusive Economic Zones, the platform has strategic geopolitical importance.

The platform was officially opened in June 2003. The platform has a helipad and five lower decks for equipment and workspace. Although the station has residential facilities that can comfortably accommodate 8 people for 15 days, the station is typically uninhabited and operated remotely.

While Socotra Rock rises to a maximum of 4.6m below sea level, the platform is founded on a portion of the rock that is substantially deeper, at 40m below sea level. As a result, the platform is approximately 700m from the rock's "peak." The platform rises approximately 36m above sea level.
