= Rusk documents =

1951 US diplomatic papers on Japan

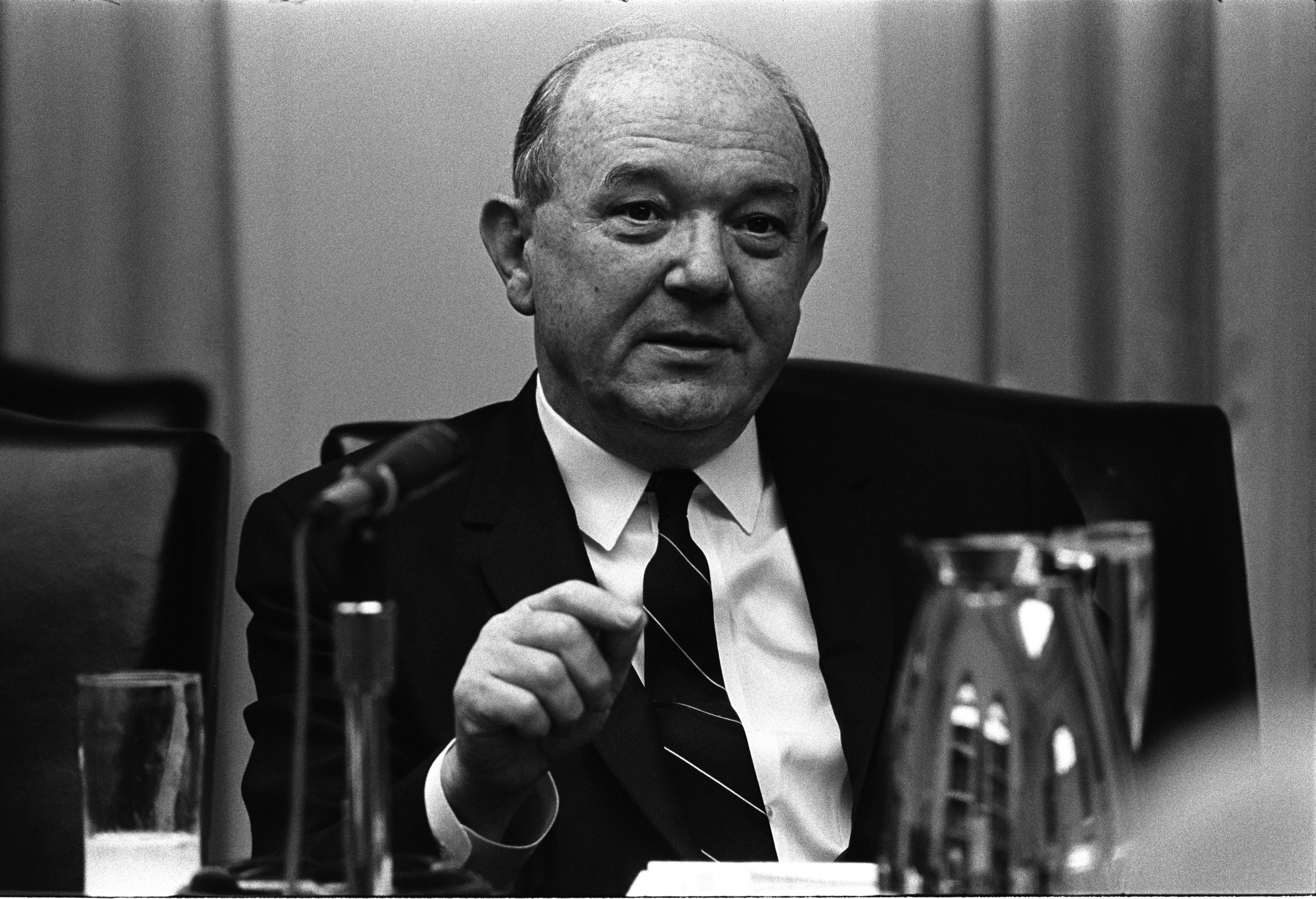
Dean Rusk in 1968

The Rusk documents (also known as the Rusk–Yang correspondence) are the official diplomatic correspondence sent by Dean Rusk, the United States Assistant Secretary of State for Far Eastern Affairs, to Yang You-chan, the South Korean ambassador to the U.S. on August 10, 1951. The Rusk documents set out the position taken by the U.S. Department of State in its bilateral exchange with the Republic of Korea.

== Background ==
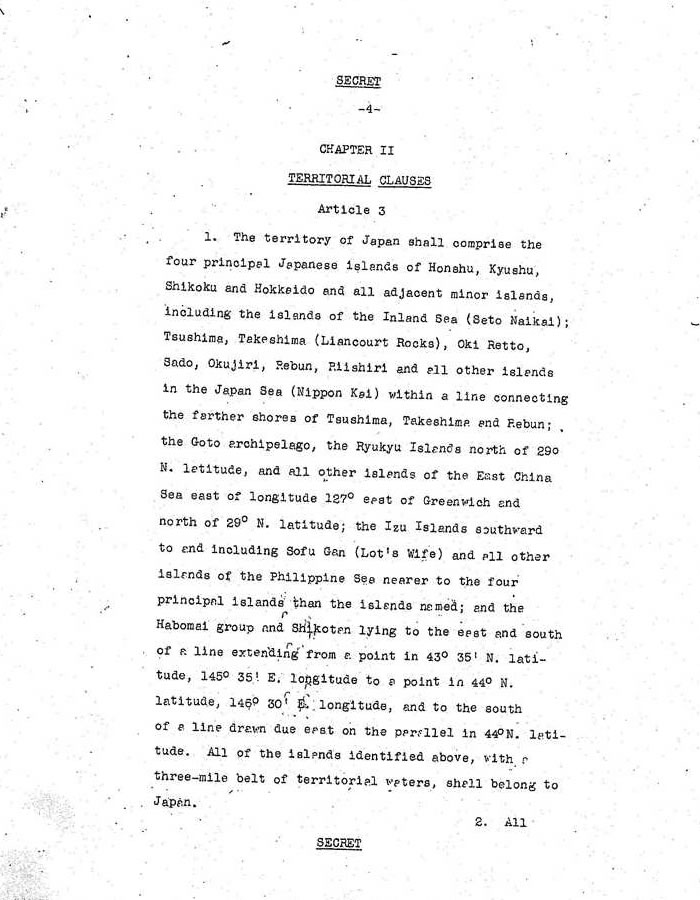
(Draft) Negotiating position that Liancourt Rocks shall be Japanese territory.

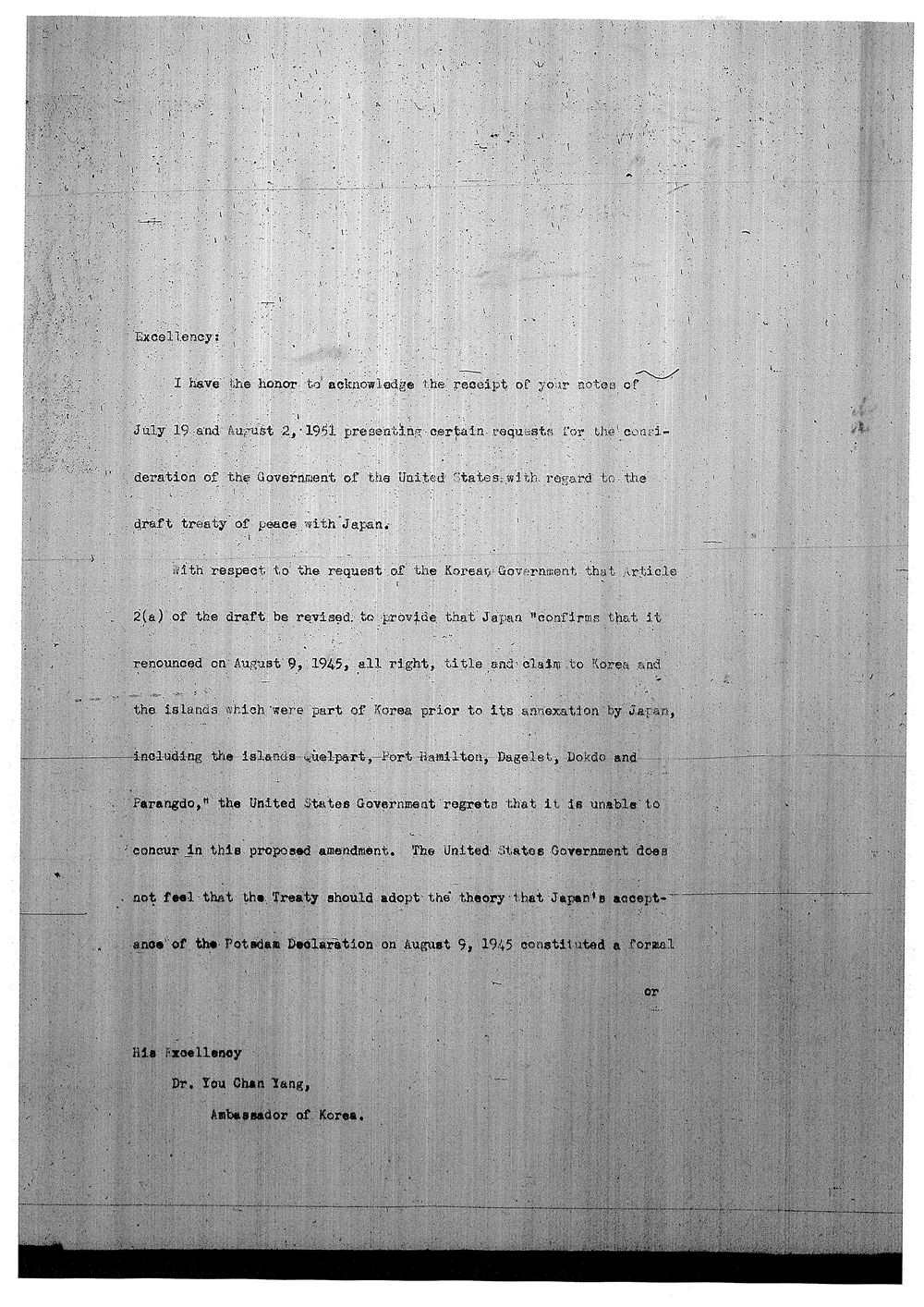
"The Rusk documents" by Dean Rusk, 1951

The Rusk documents are part of a series of documents exchanged between South Korea, the United States, and Japan, prior to the completion of the Treaty of San Francisco that was intended to formally end the Second World War in Asia (In 1945 Japan had signed an armistice with the Allies). Draft treaties began to appear as early as 1949 (see Draft Treaty of Peace With Japan). Over the next several years, Korea made a number of requests to the United States, and the United States sent a number of diplomatic responses as well, of which the Rusk documents are one. The final treaty was concluded in April, 1952.

== South Korean request ==
Three demands from the South Korean government to the U.S. government were as follows:

1. Provide that Japan "confirm that it renounced on August 9, 1945, all right, title and claim to Korea and the islands which were part of Korea prior to its annexation by Japan, including the island Quelpart, Port Hamilton, Dagelet, Dokdo and Parangdo."
2. The legal transfer of vested properties of Japanese in Korea to Korea and the United States Military Government in Korea.
3. Admit the continuation of the MacArthur Line in the Treaty of San Francisco.

== Reply of the U.S. State Department (the Rusk documents) ==
The correspondence states the negotiating position as:

- Japan's acceptance of the Potsdam Declaration did not constitute a formal or final renunciation of sovereignty by Japan.
- The Liancourt Rocks was never treated as part of Korea according to the information available at that time.
- The MacArthur line stands until the conclusion of the Treaty of San Francisco.
- Japan has no obligation to compensate for damage to private property owned by Koreans that was damaged in Japan during the war.
- Japanese property in South Korea is pursuant to directives of United States Military Government and the South Korean government.

=== Finality of restrictions on Japanese sovereignty ===
Korea had sought an amendment formalizing the date Japan had ceded control of Korea, including several disputed islands as Korean territory, at the point of Japanese acceptance of the Potsdam Declaration, but this was rejected: "The United States Government does not feel that the Treaty should adopt the theory that Japan's acceptance of the Potsdam Declaration on August 9, 1945 constituted a formal or final renunciation of sovereignty by Japan over the areas dealt with in the Declaration."

=== Liancourt Rocks ===
In the letter, Rusk wrote:

As regards the island of Dokdo, otherwise known as Takeshima or Liancourt Rocks, this normally uninhabited rock formation was according to our information never treated as part of Korea and, since about 1905, has been under the jurisdiction of the Oki Islands Branch Office of Shimane Prefecture of Japan. The island does not appear ever before to have been claimed by Korea.

The assessment was that of Dean Rusk and expressly based on the information the Department of State had at that time.

=== MacArthur line and Syngman Rhee line ===
The MacArthur line was to stand only until the conclusion of the Treaty of San Francisco: "the so-called MacArthur line will stand until the treaty comes into force."

However, South Korean President Syngman Rhee disregard it and declared the Syngman Rhee Line and the sovereignty over Dokdo on January 18, 1952, just before the Treaty of San Francisco came into force on April 28, 1952.

=== Compensation of the Korean property ===
Japan has no obligation to return the Korean-origin properties of persons in Japan: "there would seem to be no necessity to oblige Japan to return the property of persons in Japan of Korean origin since such property was not sequestered or Otherwise interfered with by the Japanese Government during the war. In view of the fact that such persons had the status of Japanese"

=== Japanese property in Korea ===
"Japan recognizes the validity of dispositions of property of Japan and Japanese nationals made by or pursuant to directives of United States Military Government in any of the areas referred to in Article 2 and 3."

=== Parangdo (Socotra Rock) ===
South Korea claimed an island of uncertain location in 1951, along with Liancourt Rocks, Jeju and other islands.

Korean Ambassador Yang You-chan requested of the U.S. Secretary of State that Parangdo (Korean: 파랑도; Hanja: 波浪島) be included in the abandoned territory of Japan. After U.S. Ambassador John Foster Dulles asked about where Parangdo and Liancourt Rocks were located and the First Secretary of the Korean embassy Pyo Wook-han replied that they were located in the Sea of Japan (East Sea) near Ulleungdo. Mr. Boggs had "tried all resources in Washington" he has been unable to identify Parangdo. South Korea had in the meantime withdrawn the claim to Parangdo.
