= Nigeria–São Tomé and Príncipe Joint Development Authority =

Nigeria–São Tomé and Príncipe Joint Development Zone, in red. Green: Nigeria. Green/blue: Nigeria EEZ. Yellow: São Tomé and Príncipe and its EEZ. Pale yellow: Other countries. Blue: Other EEZs. Pale blue: International waters

The Nigeria – São Tomé and Príncipe Joint Development Authority is an organization established in 2001 by treaty between Nigeria and São Tomé and Príncipe to regulate a joint Development Zone along the two countries maritime border in the Bight of Bonny .

== Background ==
The Nigeria–São Tomé and Príncipe Joint Development Authority (NSTPJDA) is an organization established in 2001 by treaty that regulates the two countries' Joint Development Zone in the Bight of Bonny, along the maritime Nigeria–São Tomé and Príncipe border.

The Joint Development Zone is an area speculated to be rich in oil and gas reserves. Because neither country could have explored the resources in the zone without interfering with the maritime territory of the other country, the countries agreed in a treaty to create a joint development authority which would assist both countries in benefitting from the economic potential of the zone.

The Treaty between the Federal Republic of Nigeria and the Democratic Republic of São Tomé and Príncipe on the Joint Development of Petroleum and other Resources, in respect of Areas of the Exclusive Economic Zone of the Two States was signed in Abuja on 21 February 2001. The Joint Development Authority head office is located in Abuja, Nigeria, whose bill for the development of the building in 2013 was inflated.

In 2015, Nigeria considered pulling out of the joint venture, saying it had paid the bills for the last 5 years and the expected 100 million US$/year were not materializing. Sao Tome and Principe had changed interests of the joint venture to fishing, since oil prospects were dim.

As of 2016, the JDA had a budget of around US$12 million per year and there were allegations of financial irregularities. Since 2004, it had not organised a licensing round.

As of 2018 the Nigeria-Sao Tome Joint Development Authority had funding problems and could not pay staff for months, "despite raking in a total of $300 million in signature bonuses from exploration and exploitation of natural resources in 2001".

In 2019, the Extractive Industries Transparency Initiative International Secretariat requested "reconciliation of revenues and disclosure of contextual information" which it had already asked for in 2015/2016.
