= Syngman Rhee Line =

1952–1965 South Korean–claimed maritime boundary

- Hangul: 평화선
- Hanja: 平和線
- RR: Pyeonghwaseon
- MR: P'yŏnghwasŏn

Alternate name
- Hangul: 이승만 라인
- Hanja: 李承晚 라인
- RR: I Seungman rain
- MR: I Sŭngman rain

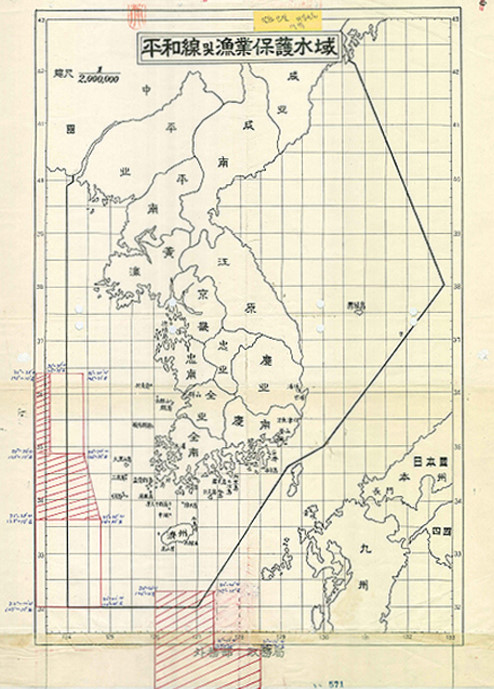
Map showing the Syngman Rhee Line (blue line around Korean Peninsula)

The Syngman Rhee Line (Korean: 이승만 라인) was a marine boundary line established by South Korean President Syngman Rhee in his "Peace Line" (평화선) declaration of January 18, 1952, establishing a wide area of maritime sovereignty, beyond internationally accepted territorial waters, around the entire Korean Peninsula. This included placing the Liancourt Rocks (Dokdo/Takeshima) in South Korean territory. The line was abolished in 1965 with the signing of a Japanese–South Korean fishing agreement.

== Background ==
After the outbreak of the Korean War, General Douglas MacArthur declared a maritime security area surrounding the Korean Peninsula, effectively barring entry of foreign shipping crafts. South Korea had demanded that the MacArthur line should continue to be enforced. On August 10, 1951, however, the United States sent Korean Ambassador Yang You Chan the Rusk documents, stating that the official policy of the United States was that the MacArthur line would be abolished by the Treaty of San Francisco. The treaty was signed on September 8 of the same year, about a month after the documents were sent, and was to come into effect on April 28, 1952. In response, the South Korean government declared the Syngman Rhee Line three months before this date, when the extinction of the MacArthur line and the return of sovereignty to Japan were meant to be established.

== Peace Line ==
The Proclamation asserted that the "Government of the Republic of Korea holds and exercises the national sovereignty" over the maritime area, suggesting the claim was for a wide extension of territorial waters. Representations over this issue were received from many other governments, and clarifications were made noting that the Proclamation stated it "does not interfere with the rights of free navigation on the high seas" so the Proclamation did not "mean extension of territorial waters into the high seas". The "peace line", however, covered even more of the high seas than the area delineated by General MacArthur. It claimed an area averaging 60 nautical miles from the Korean coast.

It also became apparent that Rhee was no longer addressing the Korean security or the threat of communism because the declaration's main target was Japan. In initial statements, Rhee maintained that the purpose of the line was to protect Korea's marine resources around the Sea of Japan; therefore it banned non-Korean fishing boats from operating within the waters covered by the "peace line" and Liancourt Rocks in particular.

== Outcome ==
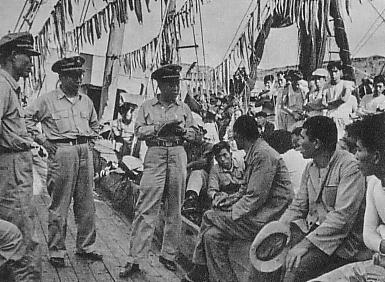
Seizure of Japanese ships by the Korea Coast Guard (December 1953)

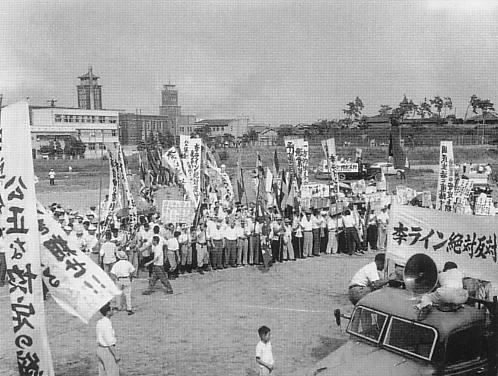
A Japanese demonstration against the line (September 15, 1953)

The fishing boats - which were mostly Japanese - that violated the boundary line were seized by South Korea. This often transpired using the patrol boats provided by the United States. Japanese records claim that such ships were often fired upon. The Japanese government protested the seizures and unilateral declaration strongly, but the abolition of the line had to wait even for the approval of the Japan-Korea Fishery Agreement in 1965. By the time an agreement was reached, 328 Japanese ships were seized, with 3,929 Japanese arrested, resulting in 44 casualties (deaths). (Note: "Rontenseiri: kindai kara gendai e" 論点整理 近代から現代へ. フォトしまね (in Japanese). 161. Shimane Prefectural Government. 2006. Archived from the original on 2007-09-28.; also cited by Sun (2012).) Japan also prohibited its fishing gear manufacturers from exporting to South Korea and stopped importing South Korean products.

The Treaty on Basic Relations between Japan and the Republic of Korea, signed on June 22, 1965, did not specifically address maritime issues.

== Resolution ==
Solving the issue of the Syngman Rhee Line required many years. Obstacles to its settlement included the fact that there were no formal diplomatic relations between Japan and South Korea at the time, that normalization talks were complicated by various compensation claims, and the refusal of the United States to intervene in the issue, regarding it as bilateral. The conflict also became an issue of nationalism for Japan and South Korea so that, in the course of their negotiations during the postwar years, any semblance of compromise or concession amounted to treason in both countries. The process took 14 years, five Japanese Prime Ministers, and three South Korean Presidents.

The negotiations improved dramatically after Park Chung Hee (1961–1979) seized power in South Korea. At this point, the territorial dispute was no longer a primary issue due to an increasing pressure to improve bilateral relations, shifting the focus from the "peace line" to the diplomatic and economic affairs such as the fishery negotiations.

According to the demand of the South Korean government, Japanese government released 472 ethnic Korean criminals in Japan who had been imprisoned as a serious criminal or a habitual criminal and granted them the special permission of residence in exchange for the restoration of Japanese detainees. South Korea refused an enforced repatriation to South Korea of illegal immigrants, serious criminals and political offenses.

== Timeline ==
- September 2, 1945 Japanese government accepted the Potsdam Declaration.
- January 29, 1946 Governmental and Administrative Separation of Certain Outlying Areas from Japan went into effect. SCAPIN#677 (Supreme Commander of the Allied Powers Instruction Note No.677)
- June 22, 1946 Area Authorized for Japanese Fishing and Whaling. SCAPIN#1033 (MacArthur Line)
- August 13, 1948: The Republic of Korea is founded and Syngman Rhee was sworn in as first president of South Korea.
- July 19, 1951: South Korea demands that the MacArthur line stay in effect.
- August 10, 1951 US government rejects South Korea's demands by the Rusk documents.
- September 8, 1951: The Treaty of Peace with Japan was signed.
- January 18, 1952: The South Korean government declares the Syngman Rhee Line as an alternative to the MacArthur line.
- April 28, 1952: The Treaty of Peace with Japan becomes effective.
- January 12, 1953: South Korea government ordered to seize a Japanese fishing boat that went into the Syngman Rhee Line.
- July 12, 1953: South Korean policemen fired on a patrol boat of the Japan Coast Guard.
- 1954 In the Report of Van Fleet Mission to Far East written by US special mission ambassador James Van Fleet, informed South Korea that the U.S. considered the Syngman Rhee line to be illegal.
- 1965 Japan-Korea Fishery Agreement was concluded and the Syngman Rhee Line was repealed.

== See also ==
- History of Japan–Korea relations
- Japan–Korea disputes
- Tsushima Island
- Dai Ichi Daihoumaru Ship case
- Exclusive economic zone
- Maritime Exclusion Zone
