= East China Sea =

Marginal sea of the Pacific Ocean

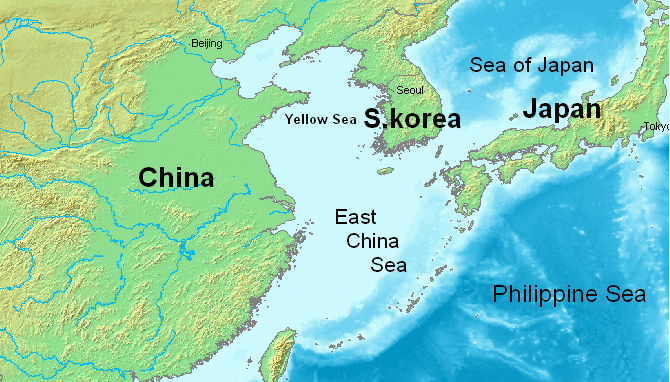
- The East China Sea, showing surrounding regions, islands, and seas

Chinese name
- Traditional Chinese: 東海 東中國海
- Simplified Chinese: 东海 东中国海
Transcriptions
Standard Mandarin
- Hanyu Pinyin: Dōng Hǎi; Dōng Zhōngguó Hǎi
- Bopomofo: ㄉㄨㄥ ㄏㄞˇ ㄉㄨㄥ ㄓㄨㄥ ㄍㄨㄛˊ ㄏㄞˇ
Wu
- Romanization: ton^{平} he^{上} ton^{平} tson^{平} koh^{入} he^{上}
Hakka
- Romanization: dung^{24} hoi^{31} dung^{24} dung^{24} gued^{2} hoi^{31}
Yue: Cantonese
- Jyutping: dung^{1} hoi^{2} dung^{1} zung^{1} gwok^{3} hoi^{2}
Southern Min
- Hokkien POJ: tong-hái tong tiong-kok hái
Eastern Min
- Fuzhou BUC: dĕ̤ng-hāi dĕ̤ng dṳ̆ng-guók hāi

Korean name
- Hangul: 동중국해
- Hanja: 東中國海
Transcriptions
- Revised Romanization: Dongjunggukhae
- McCune–Reischauer: Tongjunggukhae

Japanese name
- Kanji: 東シナ海 (since 2004) 東支那海 (1913–2004)
- Kana: ひがしシナかい
Transcriptions
- Romanization: Higashi Shina Kai

The East China Sea is a marginal sea of the Western Pacific Ocean, located directly offshore from East China. China names the body of water along its eastern coast as the "East Sea" (东海; 東海; Dōng Hǎi) due to direction, the name of "East China Sea" is otherwise designated as a formal name by International Hydrographic Organization (IHO) and used internationally.

It covers an area of roughly 1,249,000 square kilometers (482,000 sq mi). The sea's northern extension between Korean Peninsula and mainland China is the Yellow Sea, separated by an imaginary line between the southwestern tip of South Korea's Jeju Island and the eastern tip of Qidong at the Yangtze River estuary.

The East China Sea is bounded in the east and southeast by the middle portion of the first island chain off the eastern Eurasian continental mainland, including the Japanese island of Kyushu and the Ryukyu Islands, and in the south by the island of Taiwan. It connects with the Sea of Japan in the northeast through the Korea Strait, the South China Sea in the southwest via the Taiwan Strait, and the Philippine Sea in the southeast via gaps between the various Ryukyu Islands (e.g. Tokara Strait and Miyako Strait).

Most of the East China Sea is shallow, with almost three-fourths of it being less than 200 metres (660 ft) deep, its average depth being 350 metres (1,150 ft), while the maximum depth, reached in the Okinawa Trough, is 2,716 metres (8,911 ft).

The Korean peninsula, China, Japan, and Taiwan lie within or border the East China Sea.

== Geography ==
The East China Sea is an arm of the Pacific Ocean and covers an area of roughly 770,000 square kilometers (300,000 sq mi). It is bounded on the east by Kyūshū and the Ryukyu Islands of Japan, on the south by the South China Sea, and on the west by the Asian continent. It connects with the Sea of Japan through the Korea Strait; it opens in the north to the Yellow Sea.

Countries with borders on the sea (clockwise from north) include: South Korea, Japan, Taiwan and China.

=== Extent ===
The International Hydrographic Organization defines the limits of the "Eastern China Sea (Tung Hai)" as follows:

On the South.

The Northern limit of the South China Sea [From Fuki Kaku the North point of Formosa to Kiushan Tao (Turnabout Island) on to the South point of Haitan Tao (25°25' N) and thence Westward on the parallel of 25°24' North to the coast of Fukien], thence from Santyo the Northeastern point of Formosa to the West point of Yonakuni Island and thence to Haderuma Sima (24°03′ N, 123°47′ E).

On the East.

From Haderuma Sima a line including the Miyako Retto to the East point of Miyako Sima and thence to Okinan Kaku, the Southern extremity of Okinawa Sima through this island to Ada-Ko Sima (Sidmouth Island) on to the East point of Kikai Sima (28°20' N) through Tanegra Sima (30°30' N) to the North point thereof and on to Hi-Saki (31°17' N) in Kyusyu.

On the North.

From Nomo Saki (32°35' N) in Kyusyu to the South point of Hukae Sima (Goto Retto) and on through this island to Ose Saki (Cape Goto) and to Hunan Kan, the South point of Saisyu To (Quelpart), through this island to its Western extreme and thence along the parallel of 33°17' North to the mainland.

On the West.

The mainland of China.

=== Rivers ===
The Yangtze River (Chang Jiang) is the largest river flowing into the East China Sea.

=== Islands and reefs ===
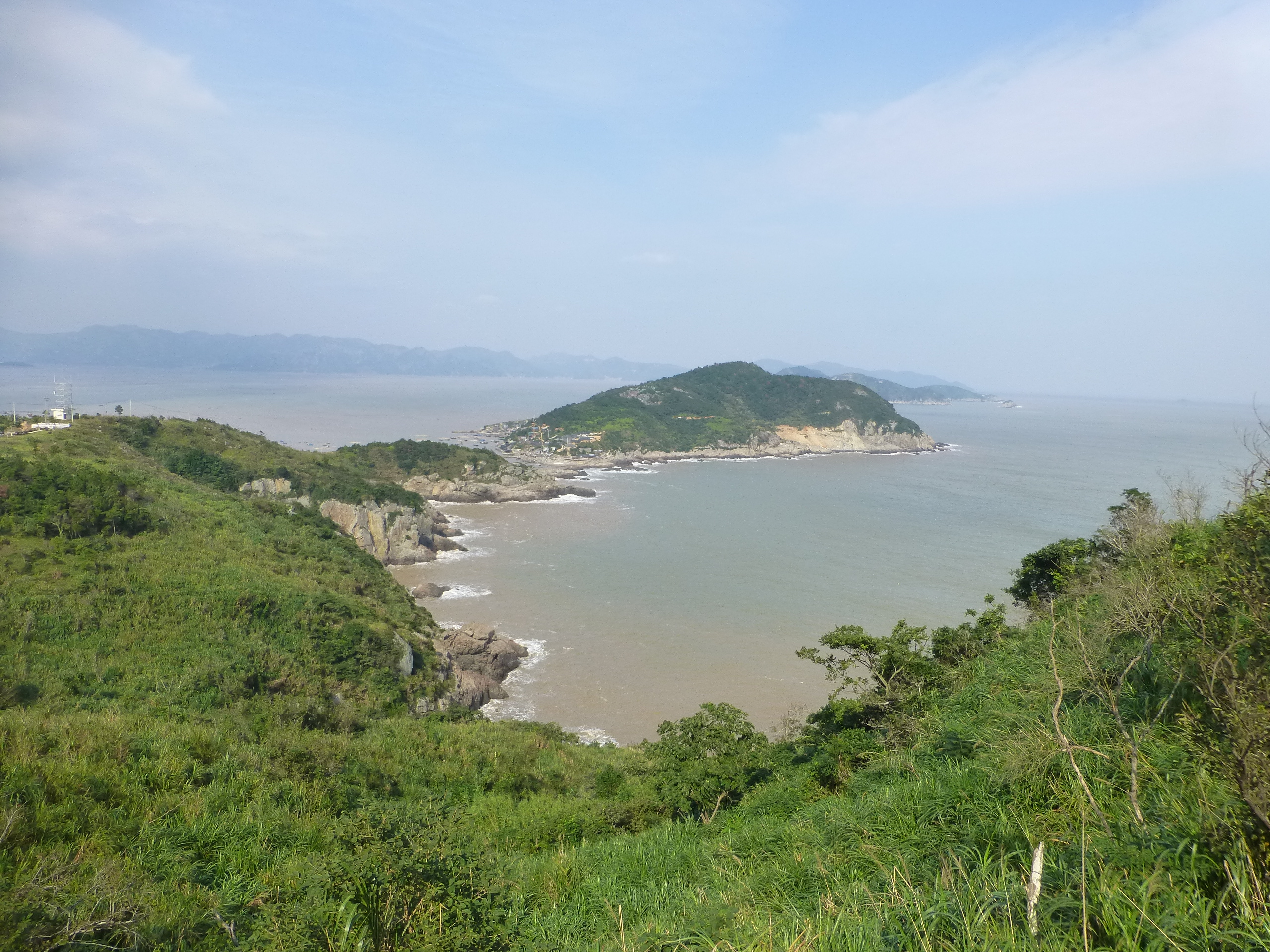
East China Sea coast in Cangnan County, Zhejiang

- Tong Island

There is a cluster of submerged reefs in the northern East China Sea. These include:

- Socotra Rock, also called Suyan Rock or Ieodo, a subject of an EEZ dispute between the People's Republic of China and South Korea.
- Hupijiao Rock (虎皮礁)
- Yajiao Rock (鴨礁)

== Nomenclature ==
The sea is called the East Sea in Chinese (东海; 東海; Dōng Hǎi), and is one of the Four Seas of Chinese literature. There are three other seas, one for each of the four cardinal directions.

Until World War II, the sea was referred to as 東支那海 (Higashi Shina Kai; "East Shina Sea") in Japanese. In 2004, official documents of the Japanese Foreign Ministry and other departments switched to the name 東シナ海 (pronounced the same), which has become the standard usage in Japan.

Common usage in Indonesia refers to the sea as Laut Cina Timur (East China Sea). This name was used officially by the Indonesian government until 2014, when Indonesia switched usage from the word Cina to Tiongkok instead; since then, the name Laut Tiongkok Timur become standard usage in Indonesia. Despite this, many Indonesian media outlets and publications continue to use the former sea name.

== History ==
=== Whaling ===
American whaleships cruised for right whales in the sea between 1849 and 1892.

=== EEZ disputes ===
There are disputes between China (PRC), Japan, Taiwan, and South Korea over the extent of their respective exclusive economic zones (EEZ).

The dispute between the PRC and Japan concerns the different application of the 1982 United Nations Convention on the Law of the Sea (UNCLOS), which both nations have ratified. China and Japan both claim 200 nautical miles EEZ rights, but the East China Sea width is only 360 nautical miles. China proposed the application of UNCLOS, considering the natural prolongation of its continental shelf, advocating that the EEZ extends as far as the Okinawa Trough. Its Ministry of Foreign Affairs has stated that "the natural prolongation of the continental shelf of China in the East China Sea extends to the Okinawa Trough and beyond 200 nautical miles from the baselines from which the breadth of the territorial sea of China is measured," which is applicable to the relevant UNCLOS provisions that support China's right to the natural shelf. In 2012, China presented a submission under the UNCLOS concerning the outer limits of the continental shelf to the UN. However, Japan claims about 40,000 square kilometers part of this territory as its own EEZ because it is within 200 nautical miles (370 km) from its coast, and thus proposed the median line division of the EEZ.

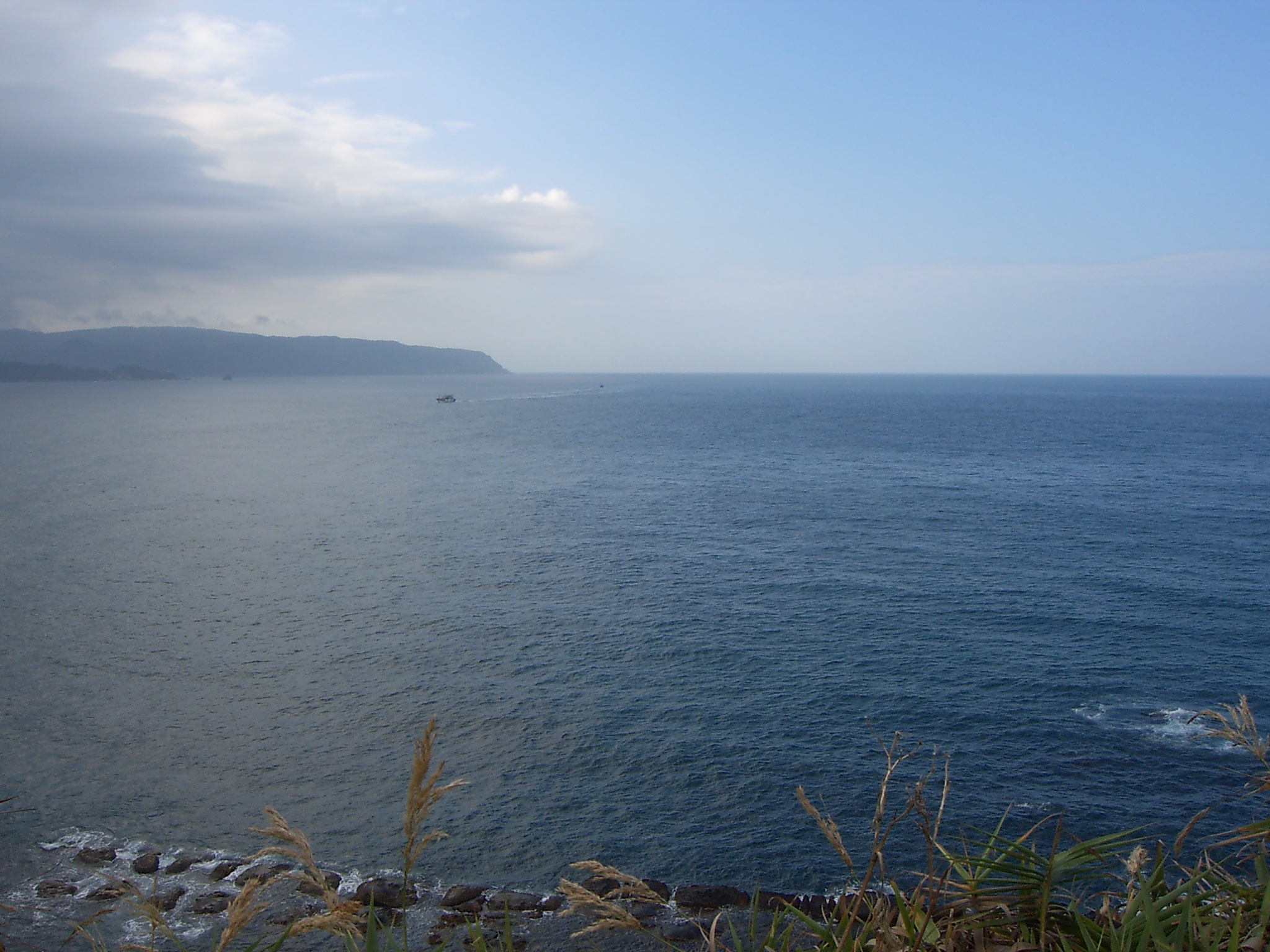
East China Sea from Yeliou, Taiwan

In 1995, the People's Republic of China (PRC) discovered an undersea natural gas field in the East China Sea, namely the Chunxiao gas field, which lies within the Chinese EEZ while Japan believes it is connected to other possible reserves beyond the median line. Japan has objected to PRC development of natural gas resources in the East China Sea near the area where the two countries Exclusive Economic Zone (EEZ) claims overlap. The specific development in dispute is the PRC's drilling in the Chunxiao gas field, which is located in undisputed areas on China's side, three or four miles (6 km) west of the median line proposed by Japan. Japan maintains that although the Chunxiao gas field rigs are on the PRC side of a median line that Tokyo regards as the two sides' sea boundary, they may tap into a field that stretches underground into the disputed area. Japan therefore seeks a share in the natural gas resources. The gas fields in the Xihu Sag area in the East China Sea (Canxue, Baoyunting, Chunxiao, Duanqiao, Wuyunting, and Tianwaitian) are estimated to hold proven reserves of 364 BCF of natural gas. Commercial operations began 2006. In June 2008, both sides agreed to jointly develop the Chunxiao gas fields, but they have never been able to agree on how to execute the plan.

Rounds of disputes about island ownership in the East China Sea have triggered both official and civilian protests between China and Japan.

The dispute between PRC and South Korea concerns Socotra Rock, a submerged reef on which South Korea has constructed the Ieodo Ocean Research Station. While neither country claims the rock as territory, the PRC has objected to Korean activities there as a breach of its EEZ rights.

=== Navy of the People's Republic of China (PRC) ===
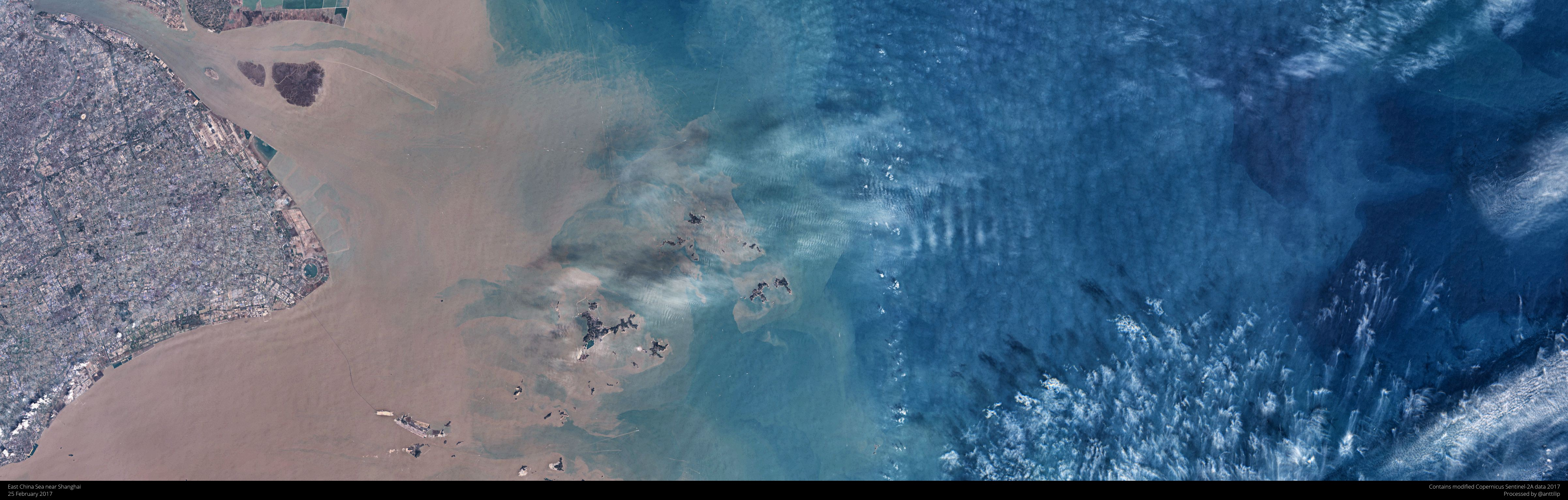
East China Sea near Shanghai

In their sphere of naval operations along their littoral (in the East and South China Seas), China today possesses more naval vessels than those of the US Navy. US Presidents Barack Obama and Donald Trump have given priority to US naval operations, under the US Indo-Pacific Command, to expand its sphere of influence in the Pacific Ocean, to counter China's growing strength, and to be ready for any unforeseen challenges in the future.

== Military activities ==
Taiwan, Japan, China, and South Korea all conduct military exercises in the East China Sea.

== East China Sea in astronomy ==
Possibly, the East China Sea (Donghai in Chinese) is represented with the star Eta Serpentis in the asterism Left Wall, Heavenly Market enclosure (see Chinese constellation).

== See also ==
- Geography of China
  - Xihu Trough
- Ryukyu Islands
  - Ryukyu Kingdom
  - Okinawa Trough
- Senkaku Islands (Diaoyutai Islands in Taiwanese, Diaoyu Islands in Chinese)
- Philippine Sea
- Sea of Japan
- South China Sea
