= 100 Great People Who Made Korea Shine =

- Album logo

Song by Choi Young-Jun and Nosasa
- Released: 1991
- Length: 4:05
- Label: SSGG Company (신세계음향공업)
- Composer: Park Moon-young
- Lyricist: Park Moon-young

"100 Great People Who Made Korea Shine" (Korean: 한국을 빛낸 100명의 위인들; RR: Hangugeul binnaen 100myeongui wiindeul) is a children's song composed by Park Moon-young and sung by Choi Young-Jun and college choir group Nosasa. The song was released in 1991 in an album of the same name. The song lists 100 historical figures in a rough chronological order, both real and mythical. The song enjoys wide recognition from the South Korean public, though some of its list inclusions have been controversial.

== History ==
Before the song's release, comedian Choi Young-Jun, composer Park Moon-young, and the college choir group Nosasa (short for 노래를 사랑하는 사람들, 'People who Love Music') had founded the Children's History Song Club (어린이 역사노래 부르기회) in December 1990. Continuing their interest in historical children's music, the trio compiled a 12-track album with the name 100 Great People Who Made Korea Shine. The album contained five original songs (including the title song and its instrumental edition), and seven re-releases. It was published by Shinsegae Sound (then 신세계음향공업, now 신세계레코드 or SSGG Company) on LP, cassette tape, and CD formats in 1991. It received an award for Patriotic Lyrics category at the 1991 Korean Lyrics Awards (한국 노랫말 대상).

In 2008 March 21, Park sued the producers of the TV show Infinite Challenge and its broadcaster MBC alleging that the show illegally modified and broadcast his copyrighted song. He later abandoned the suit after coming to an agreement with the producers. In a 2024 interview, Park remarked that he considers the South Korean boy band BTS as the unofficial 101st entry on his list for enhancing Korea's global reputation. Park also has said this song is his favorite composition.

During the 2024 South Korean martial law crisis, a remix listing 105 congresspeople who voted against Yoon Seok Yeol's impeachment went viral. Titled "105 Great Enemies Who Made Treason Shine", it was released on December 10 by a YouTube channel (촛불행동tv).

== Music and lyrics ==
The song is composed of five verses, with the last verse repeating the refrain. All verses end with the line "History flows on" ("역사는 흐른다"). The first verse features figures from ancient times to the Three Kingdoms era, the second from the North-South States to Goryeo, the third from early Joseon, the fourth from late Joseon, and the fifth from the modern era, including the Japanese occupation and the Republic of Korea.

Despite its name, the song lyric also include widely reviled, but nonetheless influential figures such as Yi Wanyong, the seventh Prime Minister of the Korean Empire who is widely regarded as a traitor for signing the Japan–Korea Annexation Treaty. Park later explained that he wanted listeners to never forget that such people existed and repeat history. The song also includes mythical or literary figures like Hong Gil-dong, Yi Su-il and Shim Sun-ae; the latter of whom appears in Cho Chung-hwan's novel Janghanmong (장한몽).

The song is widely played in elementary schools.

== Featured personages in order ==
#	Name (Hangul / Romanized)	Brief biographical significance
1	단군 (Dangun)	Mythical founder of Gojoseon, Korea's first kingdom
2	동명성왕 (Dongmyeongseongwang)	Founder and first ruler of Goguryeo (Jumong), one of the Three Kingdoms of Korea.
3	온조왕 (Onjo)	Founder and first ruler of Baekje, one of the Three Kingdoms
4	혁거세 거서간 (Hyeokgeose Geoseogan)	Founder and first ruler of Silla, one of the Three Kingdoms
5	광개토대왕 (Gwanggaeto the Great)	19th King of Goguryeo; expanded Goguryeo's territory
6	이사부 (Isabu)	Silla general; conquered Usan-guk (Ulleungdo and Dokdo).
7	백결 선생 (Baekgyeol Seonsaeng)	Silla scholar; known for his poverty and simple, upright living; played music with a mortar.
8	의자왕 (Uija)	Last king of Baekje; known for initial reform but ultimately presided over Baekje's fall.
9	계백 (Gyebaek)	Baekje general; led a small force in a last stand against Silla's forces (Battle of Hwangsanbeol).
10	관창 (Gwanchang)	Silla Hwarang; known for his heroic death in battle against Baekje.
11	김유신 (Kim Yu-sin)	Silla general; military leader in the unification of the Three Kingdoms of Korea.
12	문무왕 (Munmu)	30th King of Silla; unified the Three Kingdoms and requested to be buried at sea to become a dragon to protect the kingdom.
13	원효 (Wonhyo)	Silla Buddhist monk; popularized Buddhism in Korea among the masses using simplified teachings and a single bowl.
14	혜초 (Hyecho)	Silla Buddhist monk; traveled to and wrote about the five kingdoms of India (famous travelogue Wang Ocheonchukguk Jeon).
15	장보고 (Jang Bogo)	Silla military commander and maritime merchant; dominated the maritime trade routes of East Asia.
16	고왕 (대조영)	Founder and first king of Balhae; established a kingdom that claimed to be the successor of Goguryeo.
17	강감찬 (Gang Gam-chan)	Goryeo civil official and general; defeated the Khitan forces in the Battle of Kuju.
18	서희 (Seo Hui)	Goryeo diplomat and official; secured territory through negotiation with the Khitan.
19	정중부 (Jeong Jung-bu)	Goryeo general; led the Military Officials' Revolt of 1170, initiating military rule.
20	최무선 (Choe Mu-seon)	Goryeo military scientist; pioneered the manufacture and use of gunpowder weapons in Korea.
21 ~ 27	강좌칠현 (죽림칠현) (Gangjwa Chilhyeon)	Seven Scholars of Gangjwa (a parody of the Chinese Seven Sages of the Bamboo Grove); Goryeo literary figures known for their unconventional, free-spirited lifestyle and literature.
28	김부식 (Kim Bu-sik)	Goryeo official and scholar; compiled the Samguk Sagi, the oldest surviving Korean history text.
29	지눌 (Jinul)	Goryeo Buddhist monk; established the Jogye Order of Korean Buddhism, emphasizing Sŏn (Zen) and scriptural study.
30	의천 (Uicheon)	Goryeo Buddhist monk (royal prince); founded the Cheontae Order, aiming to unify the doctrinal and meditational schools of Buddhism.
31	이종무 (Yi Jong-mu)	Joseon general; led the military expedition that conquered Tsushima Island to suppress Japanese pirates.
32	정몽주 (Jeong Mong-ju)	Goryeo scholar; revered for his loyalty to the Goryeo dynasty (famous for Dansimga poem).
33	문익점 (Mun Ik-jeom)	Goryeo official; introduced cotton seeds to Korea from Yuan China.
34	최충 (Choe Chung)	Goryeo scholar and official; "Confucius of the East"; established the Nine-Course Private Academy.
35	일연 (Iryeon)	Goryeo Buddhist monk; compiled the Samguk Yusa.
36	최영 (Choe Yeong)	Goryeo general; stopped Cho Il-sin's Rebellion
37	황희 (Hwang Hui)	Joseon prime minister; known for his long service to Sejong the Great.
38	맹사성 (Maeng Sa-seong)	Joseon prime minister
39	장영실 (Jang Yeong-sil)	Joseon scientist and inventor (from a humble background); developed a rain gauge, water clock, and celestial globe under Sejong.
40	신숙주 (Sin Suk-ju)	Joseon scholar and official; participated in the creation of Hangul and made diplomatic and academic contributions (Haedong Jegukgi).
41	한명회 (Han Myeong-hoe)	Joseon official and schemer; a key figure in Sejo's coup
42	이이 (Yulgok Yi I)	Joseon Neo-Confucian scholar; one of the Two Great Confucian Sages.
43	이황 (Yi Hwang, Toegye)	Joseon Neo-Confucian scholar; the other of the Two Great Confucian Sages; established the Yeongnam School.
44	신사임당 (Sin Saimdang)	Joseon artist, calligrapher, and poet; revered as a model of Neo-Confucian maternal wisdom and for her artistry (mother of Yi I).
45	곽재우 (Gwak Jae-u)	Joseon civil official and commander; led the first righteous army (Uibyeong) during the Imjin War.
46	조헌 (Jo Heon)	Joseon civil official and scholar; led a righteous army during the Imjin War and died heroically in battle.
47	김시민 (Kim Si-min)	Joseon general; famous for his victory during the Siege of Jinju (1592) during the Imjin War.
48	이순신 (Yi Sun-sin)	Joseon admiral; widely regarded as a national hero for his naval victories against the Japanese during the Imjin War.
49 ~ 55	태정태세문단세 (Taejeongtaesemundanse)	The first seven Joseon kings: 태조 (Taejo) (founder), 정종 (Jeongjong), 태종 (Taejong), 세종 (Sejong) (creator of Hangul), 문종 (Munjong), 단종 (Danjong), 세조 (Sejo) (who usurped the throne).
56 ~ 61	사육신 (Sayuksin)	Six martyred loyal subjects (e.g., Seong Sam-mun) who were executed for plotting to restore the deposed King Danjong.
62 ~ 67	생육신 (Saengyuksin)	Six living loyal subjects (e.g., Kim Si-seup) who refused to serve the usurper King Sejo and lived in seclusion.
68	논개 (Non-gae)	Gisaeng (courtesan); legendarily sacrificed herself by dragging a Japanese general into the river during the Imjin War.
69	권율 (Gwon Yul)	Joseon general; defeated the Japanese in the Battle of Haengju during the Imjin War.
70	홍길동 (Hong Gil-dong)	Korean equivalent to Robin Hood.
71	임꺽정 (Im Kkeok-jeong)	Joseon peasant rebel leader; known for robbing corrupt officials and distributing wealth to the poor.
72 ~ 74	삼학사 (Samhaksa)	Three scholars (홍익한, 윤집, 오달제) who were martyred for opposing a peace treaty with Qing China (Second Manchu invasion of Korea).
75	박문수 (Park Mun-su)	Joseon official and royal secret inspector (Amhaeng-eosa); famous in folklore for his justice and aid to the oppressed common people.
76	한호 (Han Seok-bong)	Joseon calligrapher.
77	김홍도 (Danwon)	Joseon painter; master of various genres, most famous for his genre paintings.
78	김병연 (Kim Sat-gat)	Joseon itinerant poet; known as "Kim Sat-gat" ("Kim the Straw Hat") for his satirical poems and wanderings.
79	김정호 (Kim Jeong-ho)	Joseon geographer and cartographer; renowned for compiling the Daedongyeojido, a highly accurate map of Korea.
80	영조 (Yeongjo)	21st King of Joseon; implemented the Tangpyeong (Great Harmony) Policy to balance political factions; reigned for a long period of stability.
81	정조 (Jeongjo)	22nd King of Joseon (grandson of Yeongjo); led a renaissance of culture and reform; champion of Silhak (Practical Learning).
82	정약용 (Jeong Yak-yong)	Joseon Silhak (Practical Learning) scholar and philosopher.
83	전봉준 (Jeon Bong-jun)	Leader of the Donghak Peasant Revolution; fought against corrupt officials and foreign encroachment.
84	김대건 (Kim Dae-geon)	First Korean Catholic priest and martyr.
85	황진이 (Hwang Jin-yi)	Joseon Gisaeng; celebrated for her beauty, intellect, and Sijo poetry.
86	홍경래 (Hong Gyeong-rae)	Leader of the Hong Gyeong-rae Rebellion, a large-scale peasant uprising.
87	김옥균 (Kim Ok-gyun)	Joseon reformist and independence activist; leader of the Gapsin Coup.
88	안중근 (An Jung-geun)	Korean independence activist; assassinated Itō Hirobumi, the former Japanese Resident-General of Korea.
89	이완용 (Yi Wan-yong)	Joseon traitor and politician; infamously known as the chief collaborator in the Japan-Korea Annexation Treaty.
90	윤동주 (Yun Dong-ju)	Korean poet during the Japanese colonial period; known for his poems of self-reflection, conscience, and sorrow for the nation.
91	지석영 (Ji Seok-yeong)	Joseon scholar and physician; introduced smallpox vaccination to Korea.
92	손병희 (Son Byeong-hui)	Leader of the Cheondogyo religion and independence activist; one of the 33 national representatives who signed the Korean Declaration of Independence.
93	유관순 (Yu Gwan-sun)	Korean independence activist; a young student who played a key role in the March 1st Movement.
94	안창호 (An Chang-ho)	Korean independence activist and educator; leader of the Provisional Government of the Republic of Korea and the Heungsadan (Young Korean Academy).
95	방정환 (Bang Jeong-hwan)	Children's literature writer and activist; founded Children's Day in Korea.
96 ~ 97	Yi Su-il and Sim Sun-ae	Fictional characters from the novel 장한몽.
98	김두한 (Kim Du-han)	Gangster and politician; a figure in Seoul's street culture who later served as a National Assembly member.
99	이상 (Yi Sang)	Korean modernist writer and poet; known for his experimental, avant-garde works.
100	이중섭 (Lee Jung-seop)	Korean modernist painter.

== Track listing ==
All lyrics are written by Park Moon-young (박문영); all music is composed by Park, except for One Heart, which was composed by Choi Jong-hyuk (최종혁).

Side A
No.	Title	Vocals	Length
1.	"100 Great People Who Made Korea Shine (한국을 빛낸 100명의 위인들)"	Choi Young-jun (최영준) and Nosasa (노사사)	04:05
2.	"One Heart (마음은 하나)"	Choi Young-jun and Nosasa	02:10
3.	"Warriors of Daehan (대한의 용사)"	Choi Young-jun and Nosasa	02:00
4.	"Kimchi Theme Song (김치 주제가)"	Nosasa	02:00
5.	"Cheer Up, Power (힘내라 힘)"	Nosasa	03:00
6.	"100 Great People Who Made Korea Shine (Instrumental)"	-	04:05
Total length:			17:20

Side B
No.	Title	Vocals	Length
7.	"We Are the Korean People (우리는 한민족)"	Choi Young-jun and Nosasa	02:05
8.	"Talchum Song (탈춤노래)"	Choi Young-jun and Nosasa	03:50
9.	"Ssywarappappa (쏴라빠빠)"	Nosasa	04:00
10.	"Alligator Hunt (악어사냥)"	Choi Young-jun and Nosasa	02:40
11.	"Dokdo Is Our Land (독도는 우리땅)"	Choi Young-jun and Nosasa	02:20
12.	"The Foolish Ondal and Princess Pyeonggang (바보온달과 평강공주)"	Choi Young-jun	02:30
Total length:			19:45

== See also ==
- 한국을 빛낸 100명의 위인들 on YouTube
