= Chung Jae-suk =

South Korean journalist

- 정재숙

Cultural Heritage Administrator
- In office 31 August 2018 – 23 December 2020
- President: Moon Jae-in
- Minister: Park Yang-woo
- Preceded by: Kim Jong-jin
- Succeeded by: Kim Hyun-mo

Personal details
- Born: 29 March 1961 (age 65) Seoul, South Korea
- Education: Korea University; Sungshin Women's University

Chung Jae-suk (Korean: 정재숙; Hanja: 鄭在淑; born 29 March 1961) is a South Korean journalist served as the administrator of Cultural Heritage Administration under President Moon Jae-in from 2018 to 2020. She is the first journalist and third woman to lead the organisation.

She graduated from Korea University with bachelor's degree in education in 1985 and completed postgraduate programme in Arts history from Sungshin Women's University in 1987.

Since 1988 she has worked over thirty years as a journalist mostly at culture-and-arts-related department of several newspapers from Seoul Economic Daily and The Hankyoreh to JoongAng Ilbo and JTBC cable TV broadcaster.

Before resigning for CHA administrator, Chung served as a board member of Korea National Contemporary Dance Company which is managed by the CHA's parent organisation, Ministry of Culture, Sports and Tourism, from 2013 as well as a member of CHA's Royal Palaces and Tombs Utilization Review Committee from 2014.
