= Godongsan =

Mountain in Gyeonggi-do, South Korea

Highest point
- Elevation: 600 m (2,000 ft)
- Coordinates: 34°45′N 127°51′E

Geography
- Location: South Korea

Korean name
- Hangul: 고동산
- Hanja: 古桐山
- RR: Godongsan
- MR: Kodongsan

Godongsan (Korean: 고동산) is a mountain in Gyeonggi Province, South Korea. Its area extends across Gapyeong County and Yangpyeong County. Godongsan has an elevation of 600 m (1,969 ft).

== See also ==
- List of mountains in Korea
