= Yumyeongsan =

Mountain in Gyeonggi Province in South Korea

Coordinates: 37°34′35″N 127°29′15″E

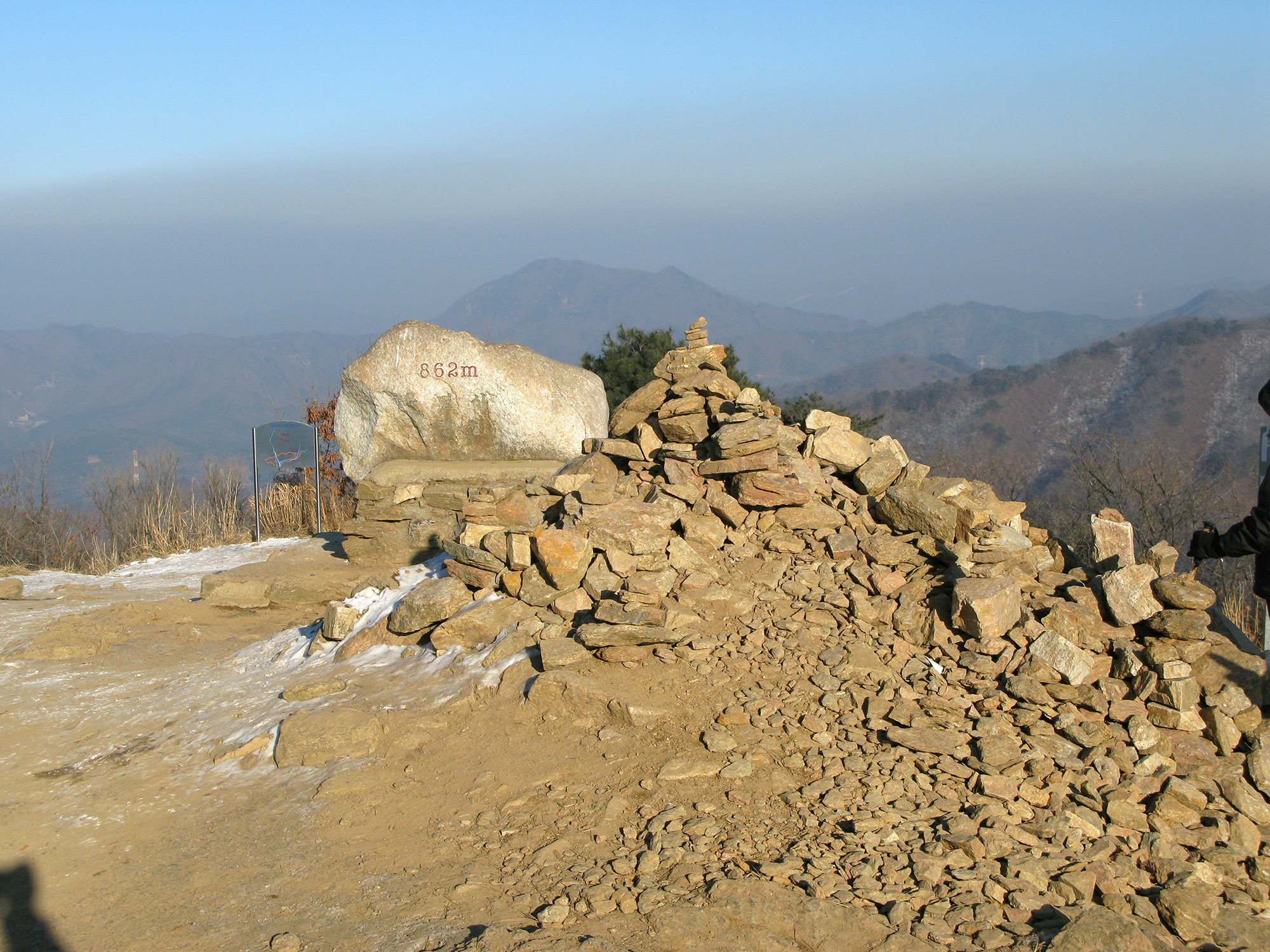
- Peak of Yumyeong Mountain.

Highest point
- Elevation: 862 m (2,828 ft)

Geography
- Location: South Korea

Korean name
- Hangul: 유명산
- Hanja: 有明山
- RR: Yumyeongsan
- MR: Yumyŏngsan

Yumyeongsan (Korean: 유명산) is a mountain in Gyeonggi Province in South Korea. Its area extends over the counties of Gapyeong and Yangpyeong. It has an elevation of 862 m (2,828 ft).

== See also ==
- List of mountains in Korea
