= Baegunbong =

Mountain in South Korea

Highest point
- Elevation: 940 m (3,080 ft)
- Listing: Mountains of Korea
- Coordinates: 37°32′0.6″N 127°31′33.6″E

Geography
- Country: South Korea

Korean name
- Hangul: 백운봉
- Hanja: 白雲峰
- RR: Baegunbong
- MR: Paegunbong

Baegunbong (Korean: 백운봉) is a mountain in Gyeonggi Province, South Korea. It sits on the boundary between the communities of Yangpyeong and Okcheon in Yangpyeong County. Baegunbong has an elevation of 940 m (3,084 ft).
