= Doilbong =

Mountain in Gyeonggi, South Korea

Highest point
- Elevation: 864 m (2,835 ft)
- Coordinates: 37°34′28″N 127°36′47″E

Geography
- Location: Gyeonggi Province, South Korea

Korean name
- Hangul: 도일봉
- Hanja: 道一峰
- RR: Doilbong
- MR: Toilbong

Doilbong (Korean: 도일봉) is a mountain in Gyeonggi Province, South Korea. It is located within the boundaries of Yangpyeong County. Doilbong has an elevation of 864 m (2,835 ft).

== See also ==
- List of mountains in Korea
