= 100 Cultural Symbols of Korea =

List complied by the government of South Korea to represent Korean culture

The 100 Cultural Symbols of Korea (Korean: 백대 민족문화상징; Hanja: 百大 民族文化象徵; RR: Baekdae Minjongmunhwasangjing; MR: Paektae Minjongmunhwasangjing) were selected by the Ministry of Culture, Sports and Tourism (at the time of selection, the Ministry of Culture and Tourism) of South Korea on 26 July 2006, judging that the Korean people are representative among cultures formed based on spatial and temporal homogeneity from the past to the present.

== Goal ==
The 100 cultural symbols of Korea are 100 symbols developed by the Ministry of Culture, Sports and Tourism to find the cultural genes of the Korean people that encompass Korean tradition and modernity. According to the Ministry of Culture, Sports and Tourism, the 100 cultural symbols provide a foundation for modern succession to Korean traditional culture and economic added value based on Korean traditional culture. It also plays a role in enhancing and promoting a positive image of the culture of the Korean people.

== Excavation target and selection criteria ==
The Ministry of Culture, Sports and Tourism selected the 100 cultural symbols that represent Korean national culture that encompasses tradition and modernity into six categories: national symbols, territorial and natural symbols, historical symbols, social and life symbols, faith and thought symbols, language and art symbols. The Ministry of Culture, Sports and Tourism has decided on the following criteria for selecting the 100 Cultural Symbols of Korea.

- It should have symbolism as a cultural prototype that forms the ethos of the Korean people (national and social character and customs).
- Industrialization should be possible as cultural content.
- It should contribute to the globalization of Korean culture, such as UNESCO World Heritage sites.
- Symbols that are common to the two Koreas should also be included in order to form a unified culture.
- Prioritize the selection of symbols related to international disputes.

== List of 100 Cultural Symbols of Korea ==
Field
Detailed field	Number	Picture	Cultural symbol name (Korean name)	Reasons for Selection by the Ministry of Culture, Sports and Tourism of South Korea
National symbols (2 types)
National symbols (2 types)	1		Taegeukgi (태극기)	The Taegeukgi is the national flag of the Republic of Korea (South Korea), and the Taegeukgi itself is a cultural symbol intuition.
National symbols (2 types)	2		Rose of Sharon (무궁화)	Rose of Sharon (Hibiscus syriacus) is the national flower of the Republic of Korea (South Korea) and has historical implications in the term Geunyeok (근역, 槿域).
Territorial and natural symbols (19 types)
Territories (6 types)	3		Dokdo (독도)	Dokdo (Liancourt Rocks), the island of South Korea that Japan claims, is a place where the need to publicize is discussed worldwide. It is also the highest symbol of the maritime realm on the Korean Peninsula.
Territories (6 types)	4		Baekdu-daegan (백두대간)	Baekdu-daegan is an ecological backbone of the Korean Peninsula. It is also a space that formed the cultural landscape of the Korean people.
Territories (6 types)	5		Paektu Mountain (백두산)	Paektu Mountain is the highest mountain on the Korean Peninsula and the holy mountain of the Korean people.
Territories (6 types)	6		Mount Kumgang (금강산)	Mount Kumgang was considered the most outstanding and beautiful mountain on the Korean Peninsula, as the expression "12,000 peaks" suggests.
Territories (6 types)	7		East Sea (동해)	The East Sea is often marked as Sea of Japan on maps made around the world. Therefore, the need to publicize the name of the East Sea is discussed worldwide.
Territories (6 types)	8		Daedongyeojido (대동여지도)	Daedongyeojido, produced by Kim Jeong-ho, a geographer of the Joseon dynasty, is evaluated as a map that accurately depicts the Korean Peninsula.
Landscape (3 types)	9		Loess (황토)	Loess has a compressed Korean sentiment toward soil.
Landscape (3 types)	10		Getbol (Tidal flat) (갯벌)	Korea's tidal flat is one of the world's top five tidal flats and is considered the highest peak among Korea's ecological and cultural symbols.
Landscape (3 types)	11		Pungsu (풍수)	Pungsu (풍수, 風水) is a traditional Korean environmental idea and natural ecology that condenses the wisdom of ancestors' lives.
Animals and Plants (4 types)	12		Pine (소나무)	Pine trees have the largest distribution area on the Korean Peninsula and are also representative of Korea.
Animals and Plants (4 types)	13		Jindo dog (진돗개)	Jindo dogs (Korean Jindo) are native dogs that live in Korea. It is designated as a natural monument, so it has a high protective value.
Animals and Plants (4 types)	14		Tiger (호랑이)	Tigers were considered representative animals of the Korean people to the extent that they appeared in Korean folk tales, tales, and beliefs.
Animals and Plants (4 types)	15		Hanwoo (한우)	Hanwoo (Korean native cattle) is a long-loved livestock in Korean history and was considered the No. 1 farm property list. It was also regarded as a criterion for evaluating abundance at various festivals and festivals, and in modern times, In modern times, it is considered a representative of sintoburi (신토불이, 身土不二, domestic farm products are the best) food.
Science and Technology (6 types)	16		Cheonsang Yeolcha Bunyajido (천상분야열차지도)	The Cheonsang Yeolcha Bunyajido, an astronomical map produced during the Joseon dynasty, expresses Koreans' perspectives on astronomy and space that have been around since Goguryeo. It is also Korea's second-longest astronomical map in the East.
Science and Technology (6 types)	17		Turtle ship (거북선)	The turtle ship, an ironclad warship of Joseon that was active during the Japanese Invasion of Korea in 1592, expresses the image of Joseon as a maritime powerhouse.
Science and Technology (6 types)	18		Cheugugi (측우기)	The Cheugugi, invented during the Joseon dynasty, was the world's first rainfall measuring instrument.
Science and Technology (6 types)	19		Water clock and sundial (Jagyeongnu and Angbuilgu) (물시계와 해시계(자격루와 앙부일구))	Jagyeongnu is a water clock invented during the Joseon dynasty's Sejong period and is characterized by the installation of a device that automatically notifies the time. Angbuilgu is a concave sundial invented during the reign of Sejong of the Joseon dynasty and is characterized by a line indicating time and season.
Science and Technology (6 types)	20		Hwaseong Fortress (수원 화성)	Hwaseong Fortress in Suwon, designated as a UNESCO World Heritage Site, is also a scientific structure designed by Jeong Yak-yong, a practical scholar of the Joseon dynasty.
Science and Technology (6 types)	21		Information and Communication (IT) in South Korea (정보 통신(IT))	South Korea is regarded as an information and communication powerhouse due to its high Internet penetration rate, mobile phone, and semiconductor industries.
Historical symbols (17 types)
Prehistory (2 types)	22		Goindol (Dolmen) (고인돌)	Goindol (Dolmens) are huge tombs and megalithic structures dating back to the Bronze Age. More than half of the world's dolmen remains exist on the Korean Peninsula.
Prehistory (2 types)	23		Jeulmun pottery (Comb-pattern pottery) (빗살무늬토기)	Jeulmun pottery (Comb-pattern pottery) is an earthenware made and used on the Korean Peninsula during the Neolithic period. Various geometric patterns painted on comb-pattern pottery are of high value in art history. It is also a symbol of the connection with prehistoric culture in Northeast Asia.
Capital (3 types)	24		Seoul (서울)	Seoul is the place where Hanseongbu (한성부, 漢城府), the capital of the Republic of Korea (South Korea) and the capital of Joseon, was located. It is also the central city of politics, administration, economy, and culture in South Korea.
Capital (3 types)	25		Gyeongju (경주(서라벌))	Gyeongju is where Seorabeol (서라벌, 徐羅伐), the capital of Silla with a history of 1,000 years, was located.
Capital (3 types)	26		Pyongyang (평양(아사달))	Pyongyang is said to have been the capital of Asadal (아사달, 阿斯達) during the Gojoseon and was the capital of Goguryeo from 427 to 668. It is also the capital of the Democratic People's Republic of Korea (North Korea).
Person (9 types)	27		Dangun (단군)	Dangun is a mythical figure who is considered the founder of the Korean people. It is also the historical, mythological, and religious archetype of the Korean people.
Person (9 types)	28		Gwanggaeto the Great (광개토대왕)	Gwanggaeto the Great is the king of Goguryeo who expanded the largest territory in Korean history.
Person (9 types)	29		Wonhyo (원효)	Wonhyo is a Silla monk who established the essence of Korean Buddhist culture.
Person (9 types)	30		Sejong the Great (세종대왕)	Sejong the Great is a king who contributed to the development of Joseon's culture, including the creation of Hangul (Korean alphabet) and the development of science and technology.
Person (9 types)	31		Yi Hwang (퇴계(이황))	Yi Hwang is a scholar who has made significant achievements in the history of Confucianism in Korea and is attracting attention as an object of study around the world.
Person (9 types)	32		Yi Sun-sin (이순신)	During the Japanese Invasion of Korea in 1592, Yi Sun-sin commanded the Joseon Navy and made a great contribution to the history of the world naval battle.
Person (9 types)	33		Jeong Yak-yong (정약용)	Jeong Yak-yong is a person who compiled the Silhak (실학, 實學) school ideas of the Joseon dynasty.
Person (9 types)	34		An Jung-geun (안중근)	An Jung-geun is a symbolic figure who devoted himself to peace in the East in the early 20th century, during the 'era of imperialism and colonialism'.
Person (9 types)	35		Yu Gwan-sun (유관순)	Yu Gwan-sun was a leading female Korean independence activist and pioneer of the student independence movement during the Japanese colonial period.
Buddhist temple (1 type)	36		Seokguram (석굴암)	Seokguram, designated as a UNESCO World Heritage Site, is also a representative cultural property of Korean Buddhist culture.
Modern history (2 types)	37		Korean Demilitarized Zone (비무장 지대)	The Korean Demilitarized Zone is a symbol of the division of the two Koreas and a space containing a future full of peace and reconciliation. The Korean Demilitarized Zone is also a place where the ecological environment is preserved because the activities of the general public are strictly prohibited.
Modern history (2 types)	38		Street cheering (길거리 응원)	Street cheering is a dynamic cheering culture and square culture newly formed in South Korea through the 2002 FIFA World Cup, which was co-hosted by South Korea and Japan.
Social and life symbols (34 types)
Economy (2 types)	39		5-day market (Jangnal) (오일장(장날))	The 5-day market (오일장, 五日場) is a traditional Korean market which has existed since the Joseon dynasty.
Economy (2 types)	40		Haenyeo (Jamnyeo) (해녀(잠녀))	A haenyeo (해녀, 海女) refers to a woman who collects seafood in a diving suit without wearing any devices in the sea of Jeju Island. Haenyeo is also a symbol of Korea's diving culture, the strength of women on Jeju Island, and the unique culture of Jeju Island.
Village Life (6 types)	41		Gangneung Danoje (강릉단오제)	Gangneung Danoje, held on Dano, one of Korea's four major holidays, was selected as a masterpiece of human oral and intangible heritage by UNESCO.
Village Life (6 types)	42		Yeongsan tug-of-war (영산줄다리기)	The Yeongsan tug-of-war, which divides the area around the castle into east and west, is considered one of the representative folk games of the Korean people.
Village Life (6 types)	43		Sotdae and Jangseung (솟대와 장승)	Sotdae is a pole installed at the entrance of the village to pray for the abundance and well-being of the village and to serve as a guardian deity. Jangseung is a pillar installed at the entrance of the village to serve as a guardian deity for ghosts and a milestone marking the boundaries between villages. As such, Sotdae and Jangseung symbolize the village faith.
Village Life (6 types)	44		Dure (두레)	Dure represents a community culture that helped each other in rural Korea.
Village Life (6 types)	45		Shade tree (정자나무)	The shade tree was considered a place to rest to avoid the heat of summer, a place to wish for peace and well-being in the village, a place to make one's wishes, and a place to hold meetings on important matters in the village.
Village Life (6 types)	46		Dol hareubang (돌하르방)	Dol hareubang is a stone monument that symbolizes Jeju Island.
Clothing life (3 types)	47		Hanbok (한복)	Hanbok is a traditional Korean costume.
Clothing life (3 types)	48		Saekdong (색동)	Saekdong represents a wider and more diverse Korean color culture.
Clothing life (3 types)	49		Dadeumijil (다듬이질)	Dadeumijil is considered one of the many sounds that symbolize Korea.
Dietary life (11 types)	50		Kimchi (김치)	Kimchi is Korea's representative fermented food that is well known around the world.
Dietary life (11 types)	51		Tteok (떡)	Tteok symbolizing Korea's rice culture is comparable to bread symbolizing Western wheat culture.
Dietary life (11 types)	52		Jeonju Bibimbap (전주비빔밥)	Jeonju Bibimbap, which has various nutritional values, is considered a globalizable food that can be found not only by Koreans but also by people around the world.
Dietary life (11 types)	53		Gochujang (고추장)	Gochujang (Red chili paste), which has a spicy taste, is also a symbol of Korea's paste culture.
Dietary life (11 types)	54		Doenjang and cheonggukjang (된장과 청국장)	Doenjajng (Soybean paste) and cheonggukjang are the highest peaks of vegetable protein culture and representatives of fermented foods.
Dietary life (11 types)	55		Samgye-tang (삼계탕)	Samgye-tang, which is made with chicken, ginseng, garlic, and jujube, is considered Korea's representative summer health food.
Dietary life (11 types)	56		Onggi (옹기)	Onggi, a jar that breathes through a small hole that is not easily visible to the human eye, symbolizes Korea's bowl culture.
Dietary life (11 types)	57		Bulgogi (불고기)	Bulgogi is a representative Korean meat dish that is well known around the world.
Dietary life (11 types)	58		Soju and makgeolli (소주와 막걸리)	Soju and makgeolli are popular drinks for Koreans and symbols of Korean common people's culture.
Dietary life (11 types)	59		Naengmyeon (냉면)	Naengmyeon is Korea's representative cold noodle dish and features a cool, sweet and sour taste.
Dietary life (11 types)	60		Jajangmyeon (짜장면)	Jajangmyeon originally originated from China, but it developed into an original food when it was introduced to Korea. It has become a popular dining menu for everyone and is considered a global food.
Housing life (4 types)	61		Hanok (한옥)	Hanok is the traditional residential style of the Korean people.
Housing life (4 types)	62		Ondol (온돌)	Ondol, which warms the floor of the room, symbolizes Korea's unique heating culture.
Housing life (4 types)	63		Stonewall of Jeju Island (제주도 돌담)	The stonewall of Jeju Island, a volcanic island famous for Samdado (삼다도, 三多島), meaning wind, women, and rocky islands, boast natural and man-made beauty. It is also considered a symbol of the unique stone culture of Jeju Island, a volcanic island.
Housing life (4 types)	64		Choga (초가)	Choga is considered the highest peak of Korean housekeeping culture.
Health and sports (6 types)	65		Dongui Bogam (동의보감)	Dongui Bogam, written by Heo Jun, a Joseon medical scientist, is a representative book of oriental medicine that is still cited today.
Health and sports (6 types)	66		Ginseng (인삼)	During the Goryeo dynasty, Arabian merchants traded ginseng, and Korea became known as "Korea" for the first time in foreign countries. As such, ginseng in Korea is considered a symbol of health in the world.
Health and sports (6 types)	67		Taekwondo (태권도)	Taekwondo, a traditional Korean martial art, was also adopted as an official event at the Summer Olympics.
Health and sports (6 types)	68		Ssireum (씨름)	Ssireum, which has been around since the Three Kingdoms period of Korea, is considered one of the representative folk games of the Korean people.
Health and sports (6 types)	69		Bow (활)	Korea's traditional archery, national archery, and South Korean archery, which have a reputation in the international sports world, represent Korea's archery culture.
Health and sports (6 types)	70		Yutnori (윷놀이)	Yutnori has long been regarded as a traditional Korean entertainment that anyone can enjoy.
Education (2 types)	71		Seodang (서당)	Seodang, an institution in charge of basic education in Hyangchon from the Three Kingdoms period to the Joseon dynasty, is considered a symbol of Koreans' enthusiasm for education.
Education (2 types)	72		Han Seok-bong and his mother (한석봉과 어머니)	An anecdote about Han Seok-bong and his mother, one of the leading calligraphers of the Joseon dynasty, symbolizes Korea's traditional educational view, which is comparable to China's Mencius's mother moves three times.
Faith and thought symbols (9 types)
Buddhism (2 types)	73		Korean Seon (선(禪))	Seon is a meditation culture and representative practice used in Korean Buddhism.
Buddhism (2 types)	74		Maitreya (Mireuk) (미륵)	Maitreya is a Bodhisattva who is believed to be the next Buddha in Buddhism. As such, Maitreya was regarded as a symbol of the future and hope in Korean Buddhism.
Confucianism (3 types)	75		Filial piety (효(孝))	Filial piety is considered a fundamental virtue.
Confucianism (3 types)	76		Seonbi (선비)	Seonbi was used as a term in Joseon society based on Confucian culture to refer to a person who has knowledge, courtesy, values loyalty and principles, and rejects the desire for government office and wealth.
Confucianism (3 types)	77		Jongmyo and Jongmyo jerye (종묘와 종묘 대제)	Jongmyo is a shrine where the sacred places of kings and queens of the Joseon dynasty are sealed, and Jongmyo ritual literally means a ritual held at Jongmyo Shrine. Jongmyo Shrine was registered as a UNESCO World Heritage Site, and Jongmyo Shrine Ritual was registered as a UNESCO Intangible Cultural Heritage of Humanity.
Shamanism (4 types)	78		Gut (굿)	Gut refers to a ritual in Korean shamanism in which a shaman makes a sacrifice to a god and wishes for the fate of human beings through dance and song.
Shamanism (4 types)	79		Seonangdang (Seonghwangdang) (성황당(서낭당))	Seonangdang (Seonghwangdang) is a pile of stones dedicated to the god of Seonang, who protects the village, and was formed at the entrance of the village or on the pass.
Shamanism (4 types)	80		Dokkaebi (도깨비)	Dokkaebi is considered a symbol of the culture that drives out evil spirits as an imaginary being that appears in Korean art works, folk tales.
Shamanism (4 types)	81		Geumjul (taboo rope) (금줄)	Geumjul (taboo rope) is a rope installed to distinguish between sacred and everyday spaces and to prevent the intrusion of unclean things. In addition, it was used as a line installed to prohibit outsiders from entering the house where the newborn was born.
Language and art symbols (19 types)
Language (1 type)	82		Hangul (Hunminjeongeum) (한글(훈민정음))	Created during the reign of Sejong of the Joseon dynasty, Hunminjeongeum is also the prototype of Hangul, the Korean alphabet.
Record (4 types)	83		Korean paper (Hanji) (한지)	Hanji, a traditional Korean paper made from bark such as mulberry, has a preservation capacity of over a thousand years.
Record (4 types)	84		Veritable Records of the Joseon Dynasty (조선왕조실록)	The Veritable Records of the Joseon Dynasty is a historical book containing 25 generations of history, from Taejo to Cheoljong of the Joseon dynasty.
Record (4 types)	85		Tripitaka Koreana (팔만대장경)	The Tripitaka Koreana is a Buddhist scripture produced by Goryeo to prevent Mongol invasion with Buddhist power.
Record (4 types)	86		Jikji (직지심체요절)	Jikji, produced during the Goryeo dynasty, is an existing metal type print.
Fine arts (7 types)	87		Mural paintings of Goguryeo tombs (고구려 고분 벽화)	Mural paintings of Goguryeo tombs express the level of life and culture of the Goguryeo period.
Fine arts (7 types)	88		Bangasayusang (반가사유상)	Bangasayusang is a representative Buddha statue produced during the Three Kingdoms period.
Fine arts (7 types)	89		Rock-carved triad buddha in Seosan (백제의 미소(서산마애삼존불))	Rock-carved triad buddha in Seosan, also known as "the Smile of Baekje", expresses the art and aesthetic sense of Baekje people and is considered a representative work of Korean Buddhist art history.
Fine arts (7 types)	90		Goryeo ware (고려청자)	Goryeo ware is a cultural heritage that expresses Korea's splendid aesthetic sense.
Fine arts (7 types)	91		Joseon white porcelain (백자)	White porcelain in Korea was in its heyday during the Joseon dynasty.
Fine arts (7 types)	92		Buncheong (분청사기)	Buncheong ware made between the late Goryeo dynasty and the early Joseon dynasty in the 16th century is Korea's unique ceramic culture.
Fine arts (7 types)	93		Maksabal (막사발)	Makbabal was originally made for use as a household item among ordinary people. However, in the 16th century, it is considered necessary to reevaluate because Joseon potters were undervalued when they moved to Japan in the wake of the Japanese Invasion of Korea.
Musical performance (2 types)	94		Pungmul (풍물굿(농악))	Pungmul is a music and dance that soothe the sorrows of farmers who work together in rural areas.
Musical performance (2 types)	95		Talchum (탈춤)	Talchum, a traditional Korean masquerade performed in masks, is considered another face of Koreans
Music (4 types)	96		Pansori (판소리)	Pansori is a traditional Korean musical style and a kind of solo opera with an epic style.
Music (4 types)	97		Arirang (아리랑)	Arirang is a folk song that represents Korea and has been widely sung among the Korean people.
Music (4 types)	98		Geomungo (거문고)	Geomungo has long been called Baekakjijang (백악지장, 百樂之丈), which means the best of all musical instruments. It also has a range of nearly three octaves, the widest among traditional Korean musical instruments.
Music (4 types)	99		Daegeum (대금)	Daegeum, a traditional Korean wind instrument, is widely used in traditional music and features a clear and fine tone.
Literature (1 type)	100		Chunhyangjeon (춘향전)	Chunhyangjeon, a Korean classic novel about the love between Seong Chunhyang and Yi Mongryong, is also a representative classic literary work in Korea.
