= Eobisan =

Mountain in Gyeonggi, South Korea

Highest point
- Elevation: 828 m (2,717 ft)
- Coordinates: 37.555556°N 127.540833°E

Geography
- Location: South Korea

Korean name
- Hangul: 어비산
- Hanja: 魚飛山
- RR: Eobisan
- MR: Ŏbisan

Eobisan (Korean: 어비산) is a mountain in Gyeonggi Province, South Korea. Its area extends across Yangpyeong County and Gapyeong County. Eobisan has an elevation of 828 m (2,717 ft).

== See also ==
- List of mountains in Korea
