= Sorisan =

Mountain in South Korea

Highest point
- Elevation: 479.2 m (1,572 ft)

Geography
- Location: South Korea

Korean name
- Hangul: 소리산
- Hanja: 小理山
- RR: Sorisan
- MR: Sorisan

Sorisan (Korean: 소리산) is a mountain in Yangpyeong County, Gyeonggi Province in South Korea. It has an elevation of 479.2 m (1,572 ft).

== See also ==
- List of mountains in Korea
