= Udusan =

Mountain in South Korea

Coordinates: 37.407051°N 127.646885°E

Highest point
- Elevation: 473 m (1,552 ft)

Geography
- Location: South Korea

Korean name
- Hangul: 우두산
- Hanja: 牛頭山
- RR: Udusan
- MR: Udusan

Udusan (Korean: 우두산) is a mountain in Gyeonggi Province, South Korea. It sits between the counties of Yangpyeong and Yeoju. Udusan has an elevation of 473 m (1,552 ft).

== See also ==
- List of mountains in Korea
