= Hamwangbong =

Mountain in South Korea

Highest point
- Elevation: 947 m (3,107 ft)

Geography
- Location: South Korea

Korean name
- Hangul: 함왕봉
- Hanja: 咸王峰
- RR: Hamwangbong
- MR: Hamwangbong

Hamwangbong (Korean: 함왕봉) is a mountain in Yangpyeong County, Gyeonggi Province, South Korea. It has an elevation of 947 m (3,107 ft).

== See also ==
- List of mountains in Korea
