= Hwang Hee (politician) =

South Korean politician (born 1967)

- 황희
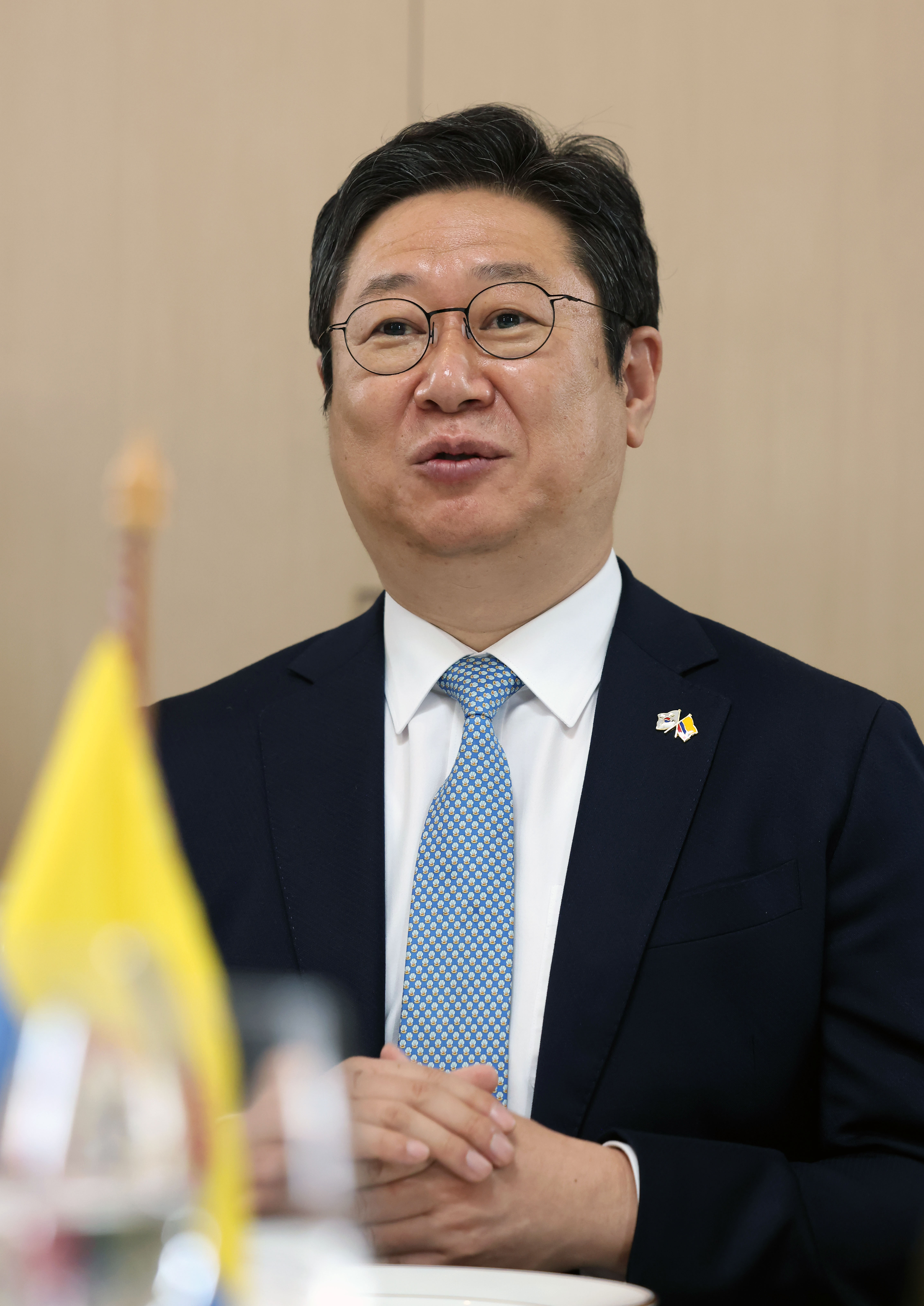
- Hwang Hee in 2022

Minister of Culture, Sports and Tourism
- In office 11 February 2021 – 13 May 2022
- President: Moon Jae-in
- Prime Minister: Chung Sye-kyun; Kim Boo-kyum
- Preceded by: Park Yang-woo
- Succeeded by: Park Bo-gyoon

Member of the National Assembly
- Incumbent
- Assumed office 30 May 2016
- Preceded by: Gil Jeong-woo
- Constituency: Seoul Yangcheon A

Personal details
- Born: 28 July 1967 (age 59) Mokpo, South Korea
- Party: Democratic
- Education: Soongsil University; Yonsei University

Korean name
- Hangul: 황희
- Hanja: 黃熙
- RR: Hwang Hui
- MR: Hwang Hŭi

Hwang Hee (Korean: 황희; born 28 July 1967) is a South Korean politician who formerly served as the Minister of Culture, Sports and Tourism under President Moon Jae-in from 2021 to 2022 and a member of the National Assembly from Yangcheon A of Seoul from 2016.

In January 2021, President Moon Jae-in nominated Hwang as his third Minister of Culture, Sports and Tourism as part of cabinet reshuffle.

He first entered politics in 1997 when he worked as a secretary to then party leader and prominent presidential candidate Kim Dae-jung. From 2003 to 2007 he then worked as an administrator at Office of the President Roh Moo-Hyun from 2003 to 2007.

In 2012 he failed to earn party nomination for the general election. In 2016 Hwang became the first Democratic politician elected to represent Yangcheon A constituency in over two decades.

Hwang holds three degrees: a bachelor's degree in economics from Soongsil University and a master's and a doctorate in urban engineering from Yonsei University.

== Electoral history ==
Election	Year	Post	Party affiliation	Votes	Percentage of votes	Results
20th General Election	2016	Member of National Assembly from Seoul Yangcheon A	Democratic Party	66,945	52.13%	Won
21st General Election	2020	Member of National Assembly from Seoul Yangcheon A	Democratic Party	78,196	51.85%	Won
22nd General Election	2024	Member of National Assembly from Seoul Yangcheon A	Democratic Party	71,285	49.78%	Won
