= Park Moon-young =

South Korean musician and writer (born 1952)

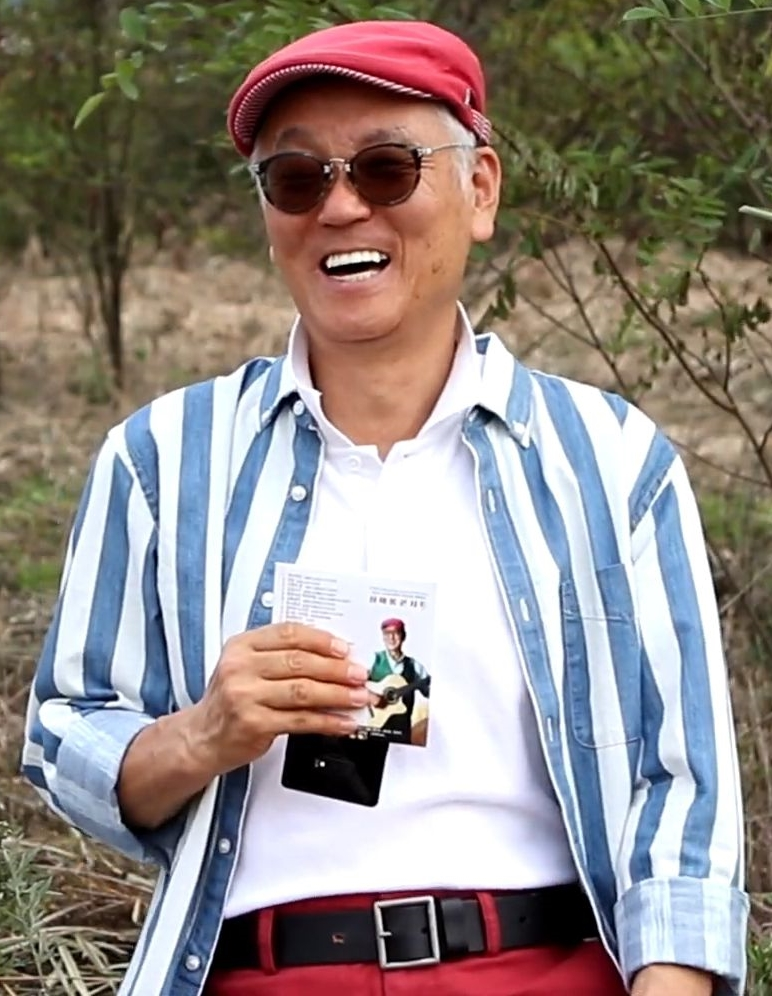
- Park in 2024

Background information
- Born: 1952 (age 73–74); Busan, South Korea
- Occupations: Lyricist; composer; singer; guitarist; producer; music critic; writer
- Years active: 1973–present
- Formerly of: Nondureong Batdureong (1973–1978)

Korean name
- Hangul: 박문영
- Hanja: 朴文榮
- RR: Bak Munyeong
- MR: Pak Munyŏng

Art name
- Hangul: 문영
- RR: Munyeong
- MR: Munyŏng

Stage name
- Hangul: 박인호
- Hanja: 朴仁浩
- RR: Bak Inho
- MR: Pak Inho

Park Moon-young (Korean: 박문영; born 1952) is a South Korean lyricist, composer, singer, guitarist, producer, music critic and writer. During his career as a lyricist and composer, he used the stage name Park In-ho (박인호) and the pen name Moon Young (문영) during his career as a writer.

== Life ==
Park Moon-young was born in 1952 in Busan, South Korea. Park's father is a carpenter from Wonju, and his mother is from Pyeongchang County. Park's parents gave birth to him in 1952 when the Korean War was under way in Busan, a refuge.

Park moved to Seoul with her family as a child and learned to play the violin since she was in elementary school. He graduated from Daegwang Middle School, Daegwang High School and Seoul National University of Technology, and worked with Kim Eun-kwang as a member of the male duo-member guitar music group "Nondureong Batdureong" (논두렁 밭두렁) from 1973 to 1978.

Park was in charge of plant design at Daewoo Engineering for a while after serving in the military. In 1977, he joined the company as an FM radio producer for Tongyang Broadcasting Corporation (TBC). He moved to the Korea Broadcasting System (KBS) following the Policy for Merger and Abolition of the Press in November 1980 and directed the radio programs To You for Forgetting the Night, Hello, Hwang In-yong, Kang Bu-ja, Rock-paper-scissors, and KBS University Song Festival. He also worked as a writer for KBS 2TV's comedy show Humour No. 1 (유머 일번지).

Park worked as a lyricist, composer, and music critic since writing and composing the song Dokdo is Our Land (독도는 우리 땅) released by singer Jeong Gwang-tae in 1982, and published songs mainly based on Korean history and culture. In July 1990, he resigned as a music producer for KBS FM Radio. In 1991, he wrote and composed the song 100 Great People Who Made Korea Shine (한국을 빛낸 100명의 위인들) released by comedian Choi Young-joon, which won the Patriotic Lyrics Award at the 5th Korean Song Awards hosted by the Korean Lyric Research Association in 1991.

Park established a children's history singing group and distributed songs written and composed based on Korean history and culture. In addition, he focused on explaining Korean history to children by operating a children's history camp, a history song class for children, and a pilgrimage to the country's history. While working as a music producer, he also discovered new singers such as Kim Kwang-seok, Gil Eun-jung, Byun Jin-sub and Siinkwa Chonjang. In November 1992, he produced A Record Celebrating Hwang Young-cho's Victory in Marathon - Mother I Did It (황영조 마라톤 제패 기념 음반 - 어머니 나는 해냈습니다) to commemorate Hwang Young-cho's gold medal in the men's marathon at the 1992 Summer Olympics held in Barcelona, Spain.

Park worked as a Seoul Broadcasting System (SBS) radio producer from 1992 to 1998. From 1994 to 1995, he served as a judge for the KBS program National Singing Contest and when announcer Kim Sun-dong got off and Song Hae came back in, he handed over his seat to Jeong Poong-song, Shin Dae-sung, and Lee Ho-seop. Park Moon-young lived with her family in Dallas from 2000 to 2006. In 2010, he worked as a professor of entertainment business at the Korea Conservatory (currently the Korea Institute of International Arts) and in 2017, he produced a children's song album Pyeongchang Song (평창송), wishing for the success of the 2018 Winter Olympics held in Pyeongchang, South Korea.

== Works ==
=== Songs ===
- "Dokdo is our land" (독도는 우리 땅, 1982, Song: Jung Kwang-tae)
- "The Secret of the Sandpiper" (도요새의 비밀, 1983, Song: Jung Kwang-tae)
- "Tiger and susukkang" (호랑이와 수수깡, 1983, Song: Jung Kwang-tae)
- "Foolish Ondal and Princess Pyeonggang" (바보 온달과 평강공주, 1983, Song: Jung Kwang-tae)
- "You're like a flower" (당신은 꽃처럼, 1983, Song: Jung Kwang-tae)
- "The Earth Will Not Perish" (지구는 멸망하지 않으리, 1983, Song: Jung Kwang-tae)
- "Hwarang Gwanchang" (화랑 관창, 1983, Song: Jung Kwang-tae)
- "Einstein" (아인슈타인, 1983, Song: Jung Kwang-tae)
- "Kwak Jae-woo, the leader of the righteous army" (의병대장 곽재우, 1983, Song: Jung Kwang-tae)
- "General Gyebaek" (계백 장군, 1983, Song: Jung Kwang-tae)
- "Gwanggaeto the Great" (광개토대왕, 1983, Song: Jung Kwang-tae)
- "Our beautiful country" (아름다운 우리 나라, 1984, Song: Insooni)
- "Shaking Reeds" (흔들리는 갈대, 1984, Song: Insooni)
- "Where are you" (여기가 어디냐, 1984, Song: Insooni)
- "Heartless me" (야속한 내님, 1984, Song: Insooni)
- "You and Me" (너와 나, 1984, Song: Insooni)
- "Eyes of Farewell" (이별의 눈동자, 1984, Song: Insooni)
- "Flowers on the edge of the road" (길섶에 핀 꽃, 1984, Song: Insooni)
- "Kimchi Theme song" (김치 주제가, 1985, Song: Jung Kwang-tae)
- "Jjarappappa" (짜라빠빠, 1985, Song: Jung Kwang-tae)
- "Crocodile Hunting" (악어 사냥, 1985, Song: Jung Kwang-tae)
- "Cheer up, Power" (힘내라 힘, 1985, Song: Jung Kwang-tae)
- "Mask dance song" (탈춤 노래, 1985, Song: Jung Kwang-tae)
- "Big rocks, small rocks" (큰 바위 작은 바위, 1985, Song: Jung Kwang-tae)
- "Glisteningly" (번쩍 번쩍, 1985, Song: Jung Kwang-tae)
- "Secretly shed tears" (남몰래 흘리는 눈물, 1988, Song: Namgoong Okbun)
- "It's Not Too Late" (늦지 않았어요, 1990, Song: Lee Ji-yeon)
- "The Season of Loneliness" (외로움의 계절, 1990, Song: Kang Susie)
- "100 Great People Who Shined Korea" (한국을 빛낸 100명의 위인들, 1991, Song: Choi Young-joon)
- "Mind is one" (마음은 하나, 1991, Song: Choi Young-joon)
- "Korean warrior" (대한의 용사, 1991, Song: Choi Young-joon)
- "We Are the Korean People" (우리는 한민족, 1991, Song: Choi Young-joon)
- "Run Boy Go Jumong" (달려라 소년 고주몽, 1991, Song: Seo Sun-taek (Super Mencius))
- "Teacher Baekgyeol's rice cake mill" (백결 선생 떡방아, 1991, Song: Seo Sun-taek (Super Mencius))
- "33 People in Anti-Japanese Struggle" (항일 투쟁 33인, 1991, Song: Seo Sun-taek (Super Mencius))
- "My Dream" (나의 꿈, 1992, Recitation: Hwang Young-cho)
- "Mother, I did it" (어머니 나는 해냈습니다, 1992, Song: Bae Young-ho)
- "Cheer up, Korea!" (힘내라 코리아!, 1992, Song: Sorimodum)
- "Friendship Made on Young Days" (젊은 날에 맺은 우정, 1992, Song: Muse)
- "Cheer up, Power Connection Song" (힘내라 힘 접속곡, 1992, Song: Becoming One with Love Song)
- "To the World of Dreams" (꿈의 세계로, 1992, Song: Samgakhyeong)
- "For the emperor" (황제를 위하여, 1993, Song: Hong Soo-chul)
- "Because of Money" (돈 때문에, 1993, Song: Hong Soo-chul)
- "The one who taught me love" (사랑을 가르쳐준 사람, 1993, Song: Hong Soo-chul)
- "If you want" (그대가 원한다면, 1993, Song: Hong Soo-chul)
- "Mother" (어머니, 1993, Song: Hong Soo-chul)
- "Missing number" (결번, 1993, Song: Hong Soo-chul)
- "The Port of the Earth, Dokdo and Seoul" (대지의 항구, 독도 그리고 서울, 1994, Song: Black hole)
- "100 Sportsmen Who Shined Korea" (한국을 빛낸 100명의 스포츠맨, 2001, Song: Choi Young-joon)
- "Ah! Goguryeo" (아! 고구려, 2004, Song: Seo Hee)
- "Don't Fight, Korea" (대한민국 싸우지 마, 2004, Song: Seo Hee)
- "Swallowtail butterfly flew to Dokdo" (독도로 날아간 호랑나비, 2005, Song: Jung Kwang-tae)
- "New Dokdo is our territory" (신 독도는 우리 땅, 2006, Song: A conjurer legend)

=== Bibliography ===
- Poetry collection I Want to Marry You (너랑 결혼하고 싶어, 1991) - Published under the pen name "Moon Young".
- Original novel Letters from Saint-Exupery from Jeongji Village (정지 마을에서 보내온 쌩떽쥐베리의 편지, 1992) - a fable-style novel with the character of a sequel to Antoine de Saint-Exupéry's novel The Little Prince.
- Comic History Travel for Children - 100 Great People Who Shined Korea (어린이를 위한 역사 여행 만화 시리즈 - 한국을 빛낸 100명의 위인들, 1996) - consists of a total of five volumes. Park Moon-young is in charge of writing and Lee Nam-woo is in charge of painting.
- Comic History Travel for Children - 100 Great People Who Shined the World (어린이를 위한 역사 여행 만화 시리즈 - 세계를 빛낸 100명의 위인들, 1996) - consisting of a total of three volumes. Park Moon-young is in charge of writing and Lee Nam-woo is in charge of painting.
- Original novel Beautiful Journey (아름다운 여행, 1997) - a novel based on the theme of one's own enlightenment in the desert, inspired by the disappearance of Antoine de Saint-Exupéry.
- Novel The Emperor - Rebirth of the Empire (황제 - 제국의 부활, 2009) - consists of a total of three volumes. Published under the pen name "Moon Young". Hosted by the Korea Creative Content Agency, the first winner of the novel category at the first Korea Culture Content Contest.
- Essay collection You can stand up when you fall over and walk when you stand up (넘어져야 일어설 수 있고 일어서야 걸을 수 있다, 2013) - a collection of essays that tell you the wisdom of life's reversal, the process of self-reflecting and enlightening yourself.
- Essay collection The Things Anyone Dream But Can't Achieve (누구나 꿈꾸지만 아무나 이룰 수 없는 것들, 2014) - a collection of essays combining reminiscences and fables about one's life.
- Picture book (No matter how many people claim to be their land) Dokdo is our territory ((그 누가 아무리 자기네 땅이라고 우겨도) 독도는 우리 땅, 2015) - a picture book written to convey information about Dokdo to children.
- Essay collection Don't Worry, Mommy (걱정 말아요, 엄마, 2017) - A collection of essays about discovering a happy life through "Mommy".
