= Kim Wang-Sik =

South Korean historian (1953–2024)

- 김왕식
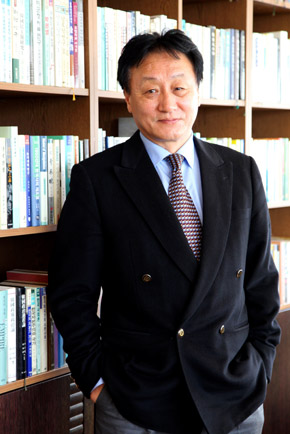
- Born: 25 February 1953; Seoul, South Korea
- Died: 5 September 2024 (aged 71)
- Education: Yonsei University
- Alma mater: University of Missouri
- Occupations: Professor, Scholar
- Known for: Korean politics and history Director of the National Museum of Korean History; Professor at University of Missouri

Kim Wang-Sik (Korean: 김왕식; 25 February 1953 – 5 September 2024) was a scholar of Korean politics and history, and was the inaugural director of the National Museum of Korean Contemporary History.

== Early life and education ==
Kim Wang-Sik was born on 25 February 1953 in Seoul. He completed his early education in South Korea and graduated from Bosung High School in February 1971. He pursued higher education at Yonsei University, where he earned a Bachelor of Arts degree in Political Science in February 1980. Continuing his studies at Yonsei, he received his Master of Arts in Political Science in February 1982. In 1989, Kim completed his Ph.D. in political science from the University of Missouri-Columbia, with a dissertation titled IMF, Economic Stabilization, and Class Conflict in the Third World. His work explored the economic policies of the IMF and their impact on class conflict in developing countries.

== Academic career ==
Kim had an academic career in the fields of political science, Korean politics, and international relations. He began his academic career after completing his Ph.D. at the University of Missouri-Columbia in 1989, where he briefly served as a Visiting assistant professor in the Department of Political Science from 1989 to 1990.

Kim was a faculty member at Ewha Womans University in South Korea, where he rose through the ranks, holding positions as assistant professor, Associate Professor, and Professor in the Department of Social Studies. During his time at Ewha, he also served as the Chairman of the Department of Social Studies from 1999 to 2001 and held leadership roles such as Associate Dean of the College of Education and Managing Director & Editor of Ewha Weekly.

Kim's academic expertise also led him to several visiting positions abroad. In 2001–2002, he was a visiting professor at the Faculty of Law, Keio University in Japan. In 2008–2009, he served as a Visiting Scholar at the School of Advanced International Studies (SAIS), Johns Hopkins University.

In addition to his teaching and research roles, Kim contributed to academia through editorial work and by leading academic societies. He was the President of the Cybercommunication Academic Society (2007) and the Korean Association of National Intelligence Studies (2007–2009).

From 2018, Kim was a professor emeritus at Ewha Women's University and continued his academic contributions as a visiting professor at the University of Missouri-Columbia, where he taught courses in the School of Languages, Literatures, and Cultures.

== Public service and contributions ==
Beyond his academic work, Kim was involved in public service. From 2012 to 2015, he was the inaugural Director of the National Museum of Contemporary Korean History, where he played a key role in promoting and preserving Korean history and heritage. During his time as Director, Kim worked to expand the physical footprint of the museum and sought to garner public opinion to relocate the US Embassy. His public service extended to influential positions within the Ministry of Unification and the National Human Rights Commission of Korea, where he advised on political and human rights issues.

His extensive work in these government roles showcased his dedication to bridging academic knowledge and practical governance, contributing to national policies related to unification and human rights.
