= Ministry of Culture, Sports and Tourism (South Korea) =

Government ministry of South Korea

- 문화체육관광부

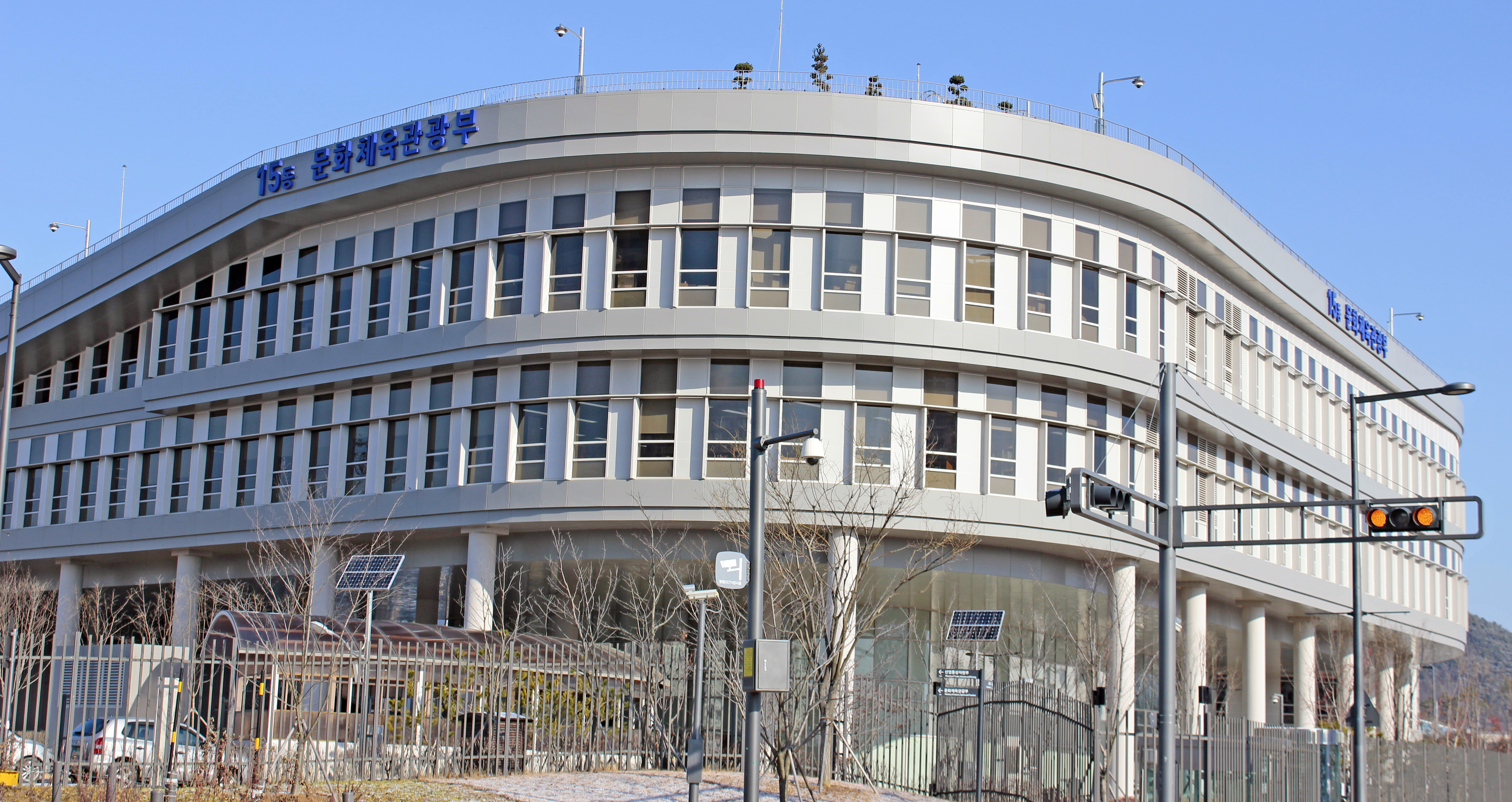
- MCST headquarters in Sejong City

Agency overview
- Formed: 29 February 2008
- Preceding agencies: Ministry of Culture and Information (1968–1990); Ministry of Culture (1990–1993); Ministry of Culture and Sports (1993–1998); Ministry of Culture and Tourism (1998–2008); Ministry of Information and Communication (Digital Contents affairs only) (1994–2008); Government Information Agency (1999–2008)
- Jurisdiction: Government of South Korea
- Headquarters: Sejong City, South Korea
- Annual budget: ₩7.067 trillion (US$4.9 billion) (FY2025)
- Minister responsible: Chae Hwi-young
- Deputy Ministers responsible: Jeon Byeong-geuk – 1st Vice Minister of Culture, Arts and Religious Affairs; Jang Mi-ran – 2nd Vice Minister of Sports, Tourism, Policy Promotion
- Child agency: Cultural Heritage Administration
- Website: mcst.go.kr

Korean name
- Hangul: 문화체육관광부
- Hanja: 文化體育觀光部
- RR: Munhwa cheyuk gwangwangbu
- MR: Munhwa ch'eyuk kwan'gwangbu

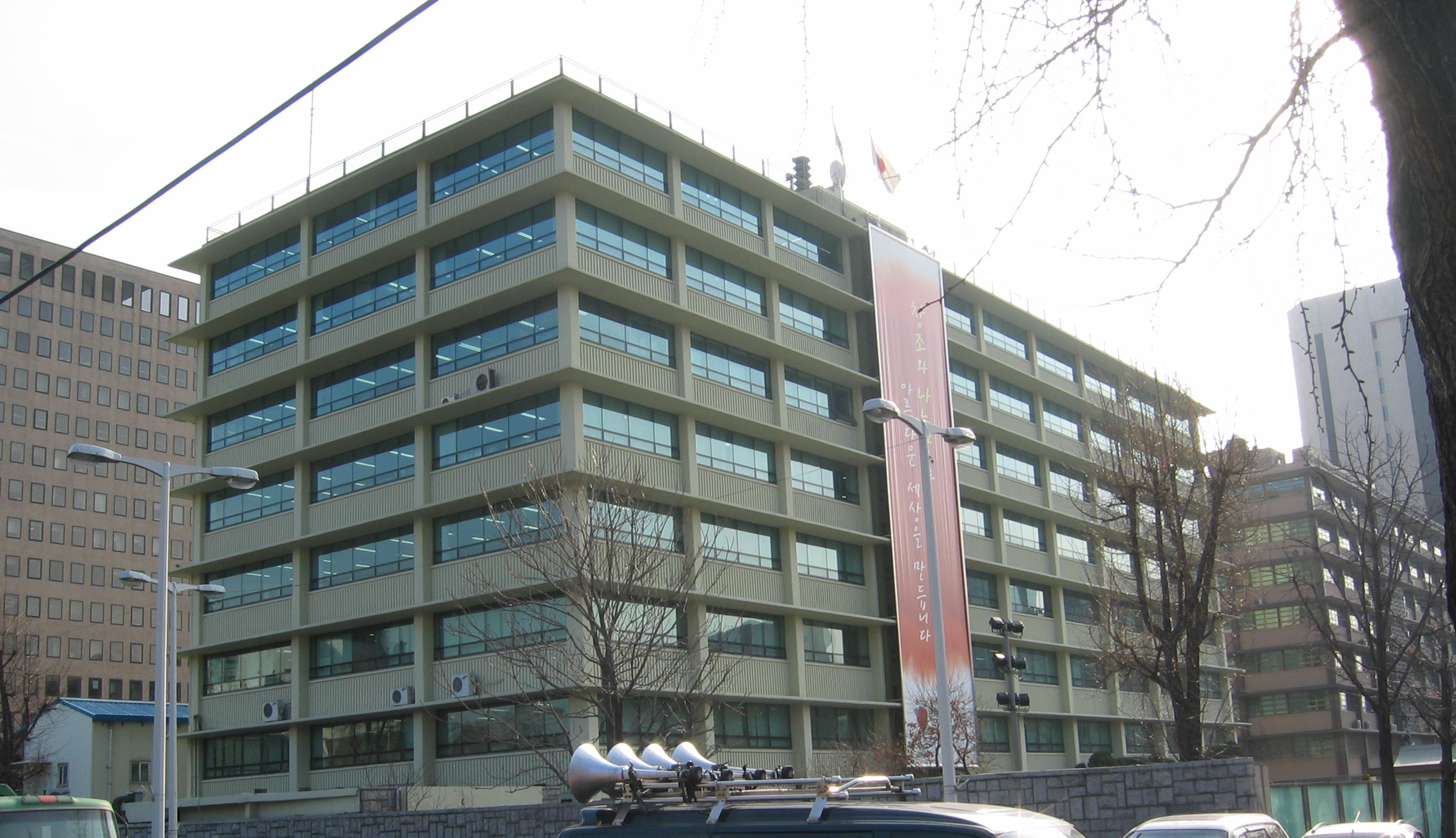
The former ministry building in Seoul

The Ministry of Culture, Sports and Tourism (MCST; Korean: 문화체육관광부) is a central government agency of South Korea responsible for the areas of tourism, culture, art, religion, and sports. It has two vice ministers, three assistant ministers, one commission, and over 60 divisions. The first Minister of Culture was novelist Lee O-young. Subsidiary entities such as the National Museum, the National Theater, and the National Library are under the Ministry.

The headquarters are located in the Sejong Government Complex in Sejong City. The headquarters were previously in Jongno District, Seoul.

== History ==
The Ministry of Culture and Tourism was originally a sub-organization of the Ministry of Education created in 1948. Later, the Ministry of Transportation set up a tourism department. The Ministry of Information was set up in 1961 for administration of art and cultural affairs. The Ministry of Culture and Information became the Ministry of Culture in 1990.

In 1993, the Ministry of Culture was integrated with the Ministry of Youth and Sports to become the Ministry of Culture and Sports. In 1998, as part of government reorganization efforts, the Ministry of Culture and Sports was replaced by the Ministry of Culture and Tourism. It was created to invest in and support the entertainment industry, as Korea needed new areas of growth in the wake of the Asian financial crisis in the 1990s.

President Kim Dae Jung put forth industrial policies supporting entertainment with the same regard as traditional industrial sectors such as manufacturing. Investments were made in both infrastructure and technology to support K-pop, including concert halls and visual effects technology. In addition, government regulation of karaoke bars favored K-pop. The government believes that promoting Korean pop culture would improve people's view of the country and help with business and tourism.

The Ministry developed the Korea Open Government License (KOGL), a copyright license that allows for the use and distribution of public materials.

In 2012 the Ministry established an advisory committee on how to sustain the Korean wave (Hallyu). In 2013, the Ministry allocated 319 billion won (US$280 million) to support Hallyu.

== Mission and budget ==
The ministry has justified its Hallyu budget by linking it to Korea's "export-led economic development". In 2012 it estimated that the Korean wave was worth US$83.2 billion, of which US$5.26 billion was attributable to K-pop.

Some in the K-pop industry have criticized the ministry for not directly supporting K-pop while fattening related industries such as Hangul, K-drama, Korean food, fashion, sports, and traditional folk music. These interest groups that have been lobbying the government for inclusion in the Hallyu budget.

== List of ministers ==
No.	Portrait	Name	Term of office			President
No.	Portrait	Name	Took office	Left office	Time in office	President
Minister of Culture, Sports and Tourism (2008-present)
44		Yu In-chon	29 February 2008	26 January 2011	2 years, 332 days	Lee Myung-bak
45		Choung Byoung-gug	27 January 2011	16 September 2011	232 days	Lee Myung-bak
46		Choe Kwang-shik	17 September 2011	10 March 2013	1 year, 174 days	Lee Myung-bak
47		Yoo Jin-ryong	11 March 2013	16 July 2014	1 year, 127 days	Park Geun-hye
48		Kim Jong-deok	20 August 2014	4 September 2016	2 years, 15 days	Park Geun-hye
49		Cho Yoon-sun	5 September 2016	20 January 2017	137 days	Park Geun-hye
50		Do Jong-hwan	16 June 2017	2 April 2019	1 year, 290 days	Moon Jae-in
51		Park Yang-woo	3 April 2019	10 February 2021	1 year, 313 days	Moon Jae-in
52		Hwang Hee	11 February 2021	12 May 2022	1 year, 90 days	Moon Jae-in
53		Park Bo-gyoon	13 May 2022	7 October 2023	1 year, 147 days	Yoon Suk-yeol
54		Yu In-chon	7 October 2023	29 July 2025	1 year, 295 days	Yoon Suk-yeol
55		Chae Hwi-young	31 July 2025	Incumbent	1 year, 96 days	Lee Jae Myung

== Logo ==
1948~2005

2005–2008

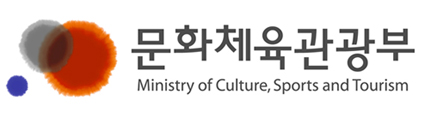
2008–2016

2016–present

== Organization ==
The Ministry of Culture, Sports and Tourism (MCST) is organized as follows:

Bureau/Office	Director/Counselor Office	Department/Division
Subordinate Organizations under the Minister
Spokesperson's Office		Public Relations Officer / Digital Communication Team (Note: Temporary organization, exists until 31 December 2023.)
Inspector General's Office (Note: Open-type position)		Audit Officer
Minister's Policy Advisor Office (Note: Has 2 positions; one special civil servant in the Senior Civil Service (Grade B), and one special civil servant equivalent to Grade 3 or 4.)		
Subordinate Organizations under the First Vice Minister
Planning and Coordination Office	Policy Planning Office	Planning and Innovation Division / Finance Division / Regulatory Reform and Legal Affairs Division / Information Management Division / Gender Equality Policy Division / Data Policy Team (Note: Temporary organization, exists until 30 June 2024.)
Planning and Coordination Office	Crisis and Safety Planning Officer	
		Administrative Support Division
Culture and Arts Policy Office	Culture Policy Officer	Culture Policy Division / National Language Policy Division / Traditional Culture Division / International Culture Division
Culture and Arts Policy Office	Arts Policy Officer	Arts Policy Division / Performing Arts and Traditional Arts Division / Visual Arts and Design Division / Artist Support Team (Note: Temporary organization, exists until 31 August 2025.)
Culture and Arts Policy Office	Regional Culture Policy Officer	Regional Culture Policy Division / Cultural Infrastructure Division / Library Policy Planning Division / Culture and Arts Education Division
Religious Affairs Office		Religious Affairs 1 Division / Religious Affairs 2 Division
Content Policy Bureau		Culture Industry Policy Division / Video Content Industry Division / Game Content Industry Division / Popular Culture Industry Division / Hallyu Support and Cooperation Division
Copyright Bureau		Copyright Policy Division / Copyright Industry Division / Copyright Protection Division / Cultural Trade Cooperation Division
Media Policy Bureau		Media Policy Division / Broadcast Video Advertising Division / Publishing, Printing, and Reading Promotion Division
Former Jeollanam-do Provincial Office Restoration Promotion Team		Restoration Cooperation Division / Restoration Facilities Division
Cheong Wa Dae Management and Utilization Promotion Team		Cheong Wa Dae Management and Utilization Planning Division
Subordinate Organizations under the Second Vice Minister
Assistant Minister		
Public Communication Office	Communication Policy Officer	Communication Policy Division / Communication Cooperation Division / Communication Support Division
Public Communication Office	Communication Support Officer	Content Planning Division / Public Opinion Division / Analysis Division
Public Communication Office	Digital Communication Officer	Digital Communication Policy Division / Digital Communication Planning Division / Policy Portal Division / Digital Communication Production Division
Sports Bureau		Sports Policy Division / Sports Promotion Division / Sports Industry Division
	Sports Cooperation Officer	International Sports Division / Sports for the Disabled Division / Sports Heritage Team (Note: Temporary organization, exists until 30 June 2025.)
Tourism Policy Bureau		Tourism Policy Division / Domestic Tourism Promotion Division / International Tourism Division / Tourism Infrastructure Division
	Tourism Industry Policy Officer	Tourism Industry Policy Division / Convergent Tourism Industry Division / Tourism Development Division

== Affiliated institutions ==
- Institutions supporting the Minister's jurisdiction:
  - Korea National University of Arts
  - National Gugak High School
  - National Gugak Middle School
  - National Traditional Arts High School
  - National Traditional Arts Middle School
  - National Museum of Korea
  - National Institute of the Korean Language
  - National Library of Korea
  - Korean Culture and Information Service
  - National Gugak Center
  - National Folk Museum of Korea
  - National Museum of Korean Contemporary History
  - National Hangeul Museum
  - National Library for the Disabled
- Executive Agencies (Responsible Operating Agencies) supporting the Minister's jurisdiction:
  - National Theater of Korea
  - National Museum of Modern and Contemporary Art, Korea
  - Korea Policy Broadcasting Agency
  - Asia Culture Center

=== Korean Culture and Information Service ===
The Korean Culture and Information Service is a department of the MCST that aims to bring Korean culture closer to the rest of the world while improving the national image of Korea. It is also responsible for setting up more than 20 Korean Cultural Centers around the world.

== Affiliated advisory committees ==
Committee Name	Legal Basis for Establishment	Notes
Tourism Promotion and Development Fund Management Committee	Article 6 of the Tourism Promotion and Development Fund Act	
Tourism Accommodation Measures Committee	Article 16 of the Special Act on the Expansion of Tourist Accommodation Facilities	
National Language Deliberation Council	Article 13 of the Framework Act on the National Language	
International Sporting Event Bidding Examination Committee	Article 3 of the Enforcement Decree of the International Sporting Event Support Act	
Library Materials Review Committee	Article 13-3 of the Enforcement Decree of the Library Act	
Registration Cancellation Review Committee	Article 9-4 of the Act on the Promotion of News Agencies	
Museum and Art Gallery Curator Operation Committee	Article 6 of the Enforcement Decree of the Act on the Promotion of Museums and Art Galleries	
King Sejong Institute Policy Consultative Council	Article 19-2 of the Framework Act on the National Language	
Media Concentration Survey Committee	Article 12 of the Enforcement Decree of the Act on the Promotion of Newspapers, etc.	
E-Sports Promotion Advisory Committee	Article 9 of the Act on the Promotion of E-Sports	
Periodical Publication Advisory Committee	Article 9 of the Act on the Promotion of Magazines and Other Periodical Publications	
Regional Newspaper Development Committee	Article 7 of the Special Act on the Support of Regional Newspaper Development	
Content Dispute Resolution Committee	Article 29 of the Content Industry Promotion Act	
Korean Language Teacher Qualification Review Committee	Article 13 of the Enforcement Decree of the Framework Act on the National Language	

== See also ==
- Cultural Heritage Administration
- Korea Copyright Commission
- Korea Creative Content Agency
- Korean Film Council
- Korean Sport & Olympic Committee
- Korea Tourism Organization
- National Museum of Korea
- 100 Cultural Symbols of Korea
