= Baekgyeol Seonsaeng =

Geomungo player (414 ~ ?)

- 백결 선생
- Born: 414
- Occupation: Geomungo player
- Known for: Poverty and simple, upright living

- Baekgyeol Seonsaeng
- Hangul: 백결선생
- Hanja: 百結先生
- RR: Baekgyeol seonsaeng
- MR: Paekkyŏl sŏnsaeng

Pak Munnyang (Korean: 박문량; Hanja: 朴文良; born 414), titled Baekgyeol Seonsaeng (백결선생; 百結先生; lit. 'Master of a Hundred Patches'), was a geomungo player from Silla. According to the Yeonghae Park clan genealogy, he was the son of Pak Chesang, a civil official during the reign of King Nulji.

According to the historical text Samguk sagi, he was said to have been so poor that he wore one hundred layers of clothing, leading people to call him Baekgyeol Seonsaeng.

== Career ==
According to the Samguk sagi, it states that the family history and real name is unknown. Also, there is not many mentions about his career. However, according to Budoji and Yeonghae Park clan genealogy, his real name was Pak Munnyang, and his birth date was recorded as the year 414. Also, it is stated that he is the son of Pak Chesang, and lived in Geumseong (modern day Gyeongju) when Jabi of Silla reigned.

It is said, after his father, Pak Chesang, died as a martyr while serving as an envoy to Japan during the reign of Nulji of Silla, his mother, Lady Kim, and his elder sisters committed suicide upon hearing the news. He was subsequently raised by his middle sister, Ayŏng.

He is said to have admired Rong Qiqi, and decided to forget everything with a geomungo. At the Chinese New Year, his wife was envy the rice cake pounding sound. Because the household was poor, Baekgyeol Seonsaeng imitated the rice cake pounding sound with a geomungo.

== Family ==
- Father: Pak Chesang
- Mother: Lady Kim
  - Sister: Agyŏng
  - Sister: Aki
  - Sister: Ayŏng
  - Sister: Lady Cheong-a, married to Misahŭn,
    - Adopted son: Pak Tŭnghŭn
