= Park Bo-gyoon =

South Korean politician

- 박보균
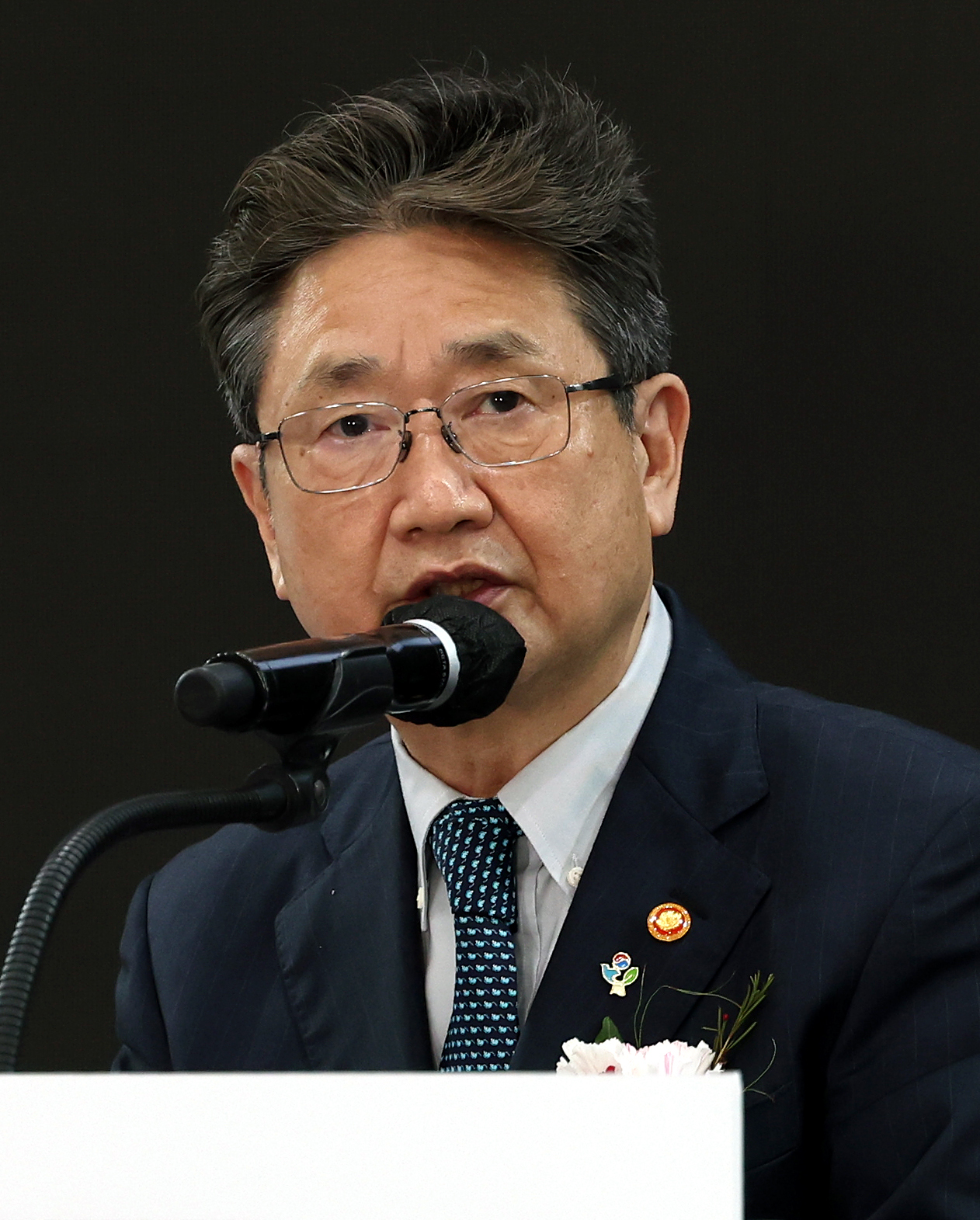
- Park Bo-gyoon in 2022

Minister of Culture, Sports and Tourism
- In office 13 May 2022 – 7 October 2023
- President: Yoon Suk Yeol
- Prime Minister: Han Duck-soo
- Preceded by: Hwang Hee
- Succeeded by: Yu In-chon

Personal details
- Born: 24 January 1954 (age 72) Seoul, South Korea
- Party: Independent
- Education: Korea University

Park Bo-gyoon (born 24 January 1954) is a South Korean journalist and politician who served as the minister of culture, sports and tourism under the Yoon Suk-yeol government from 2022 to 2023.
