= Yu In-chon =

South Korean actor and government official (born 1951)

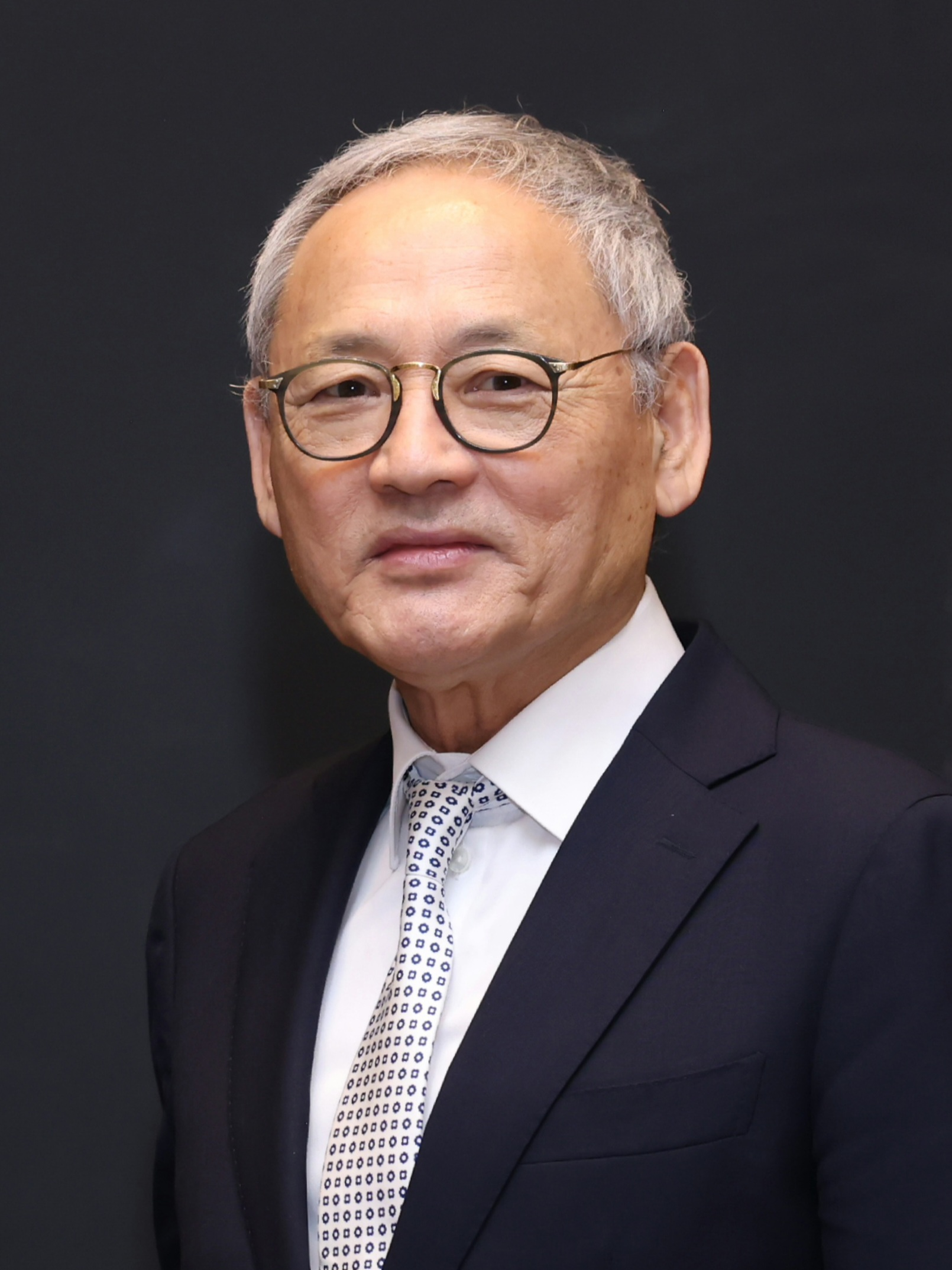
- Yu in 2025

Minister of Culture, Sports and Tourism
- In office 7 October 2023 – 31 July 2025
- President: Yoon Suk Yeol; Lee Jae Myung
- Prime Minister: Han Duck-soo; Lee Ju-ho (acting); Kim Min-seok
- Preceded by: Park Bo-gyoon
- Succeeded by: Chae Hwi-young
- In office 29 February 2008 – 26 January 2011
- President: Lee Myung-bak
- Prime Minister: Han Seung-soo; Chung Un-chan; Kim Hwang-sik
- Succeeded by: Choung Byoung-gug

Personal details
- Born: 20 March 1951 (age 75) Wanju County, North Jeolla Province, South Korea
- Party: Non-partisan
- Spouse: Kang Hye-kyung (m. 1984)
- Children: 2
- Education: Chung-Ang University (BA, MA)

- Yu In-chon
- Hangul: 유인촌
- Hanja: 柳仁村
- RR: Yu Inchon
- MR: Yu Inch'on

Yu In-chon (Korean: 유인촌, born 20 March 1951) is a South Korean actor who served as the minister of culture, sports and tourism from 2008 to 2011 and from 2023 to 2025. He was formerly the special presidential adviser on culture and sports.

== Early life and education ==
Yu In-chon was born in Wanju County, North Jeolla Province, South Korea in 1951. He graduated with the bachelor's degree in theater and film from Chung-Ang University.

== Acting career ==
Although Yu started his career as a TV actor, his fondness of play led him to found Yu Theater in the Gangnam area of Seoul, April 1999.

== Political career ==
In 2004, he became the representative of the Seoul Foundation for Arts and Culture under the Seoul Metropolitan Government, which leads the city's cultural policy, thanks to his friendship with then-Mayor Lee Myung-bak.

When the Live Music Camp incident occurred in 2005, at the time mayor of Seoul, Lee Myung-bak suggested that Hongdae concerts be regulated by authorities. At this time, Yu In-chon had a good understanding of the college culture, so he took Lee Myung-bak to the club 'Drug' and said, 'Oh! Brothers' rock performance together and defended the club culture, thanks to this, Lee Myung-bak, who was about to wipe out the clubs, changed his mind, and he dismissed it as saying he would not do it himself.

He became Minister of Ministry of Culture, Sports and Tourism in the Lee Myung-bak administration in 2008.

On July 21, 2011, President Lee nominated Yu In-chon as the Special Presidential Adviser on Culture and Sports.

On July 6, 2023, Yoon Suk Yeol nominated Yu In-chon as the Special Presidential Adviser on Culture and Sports.

On September 13, 2023, President Yoon nominated Yu In-chon as a candidate for Minister of Ministry of Culture, Sports and Tourism.

=== Minister of Culture, Sports and Tourism (2023–2025) ===
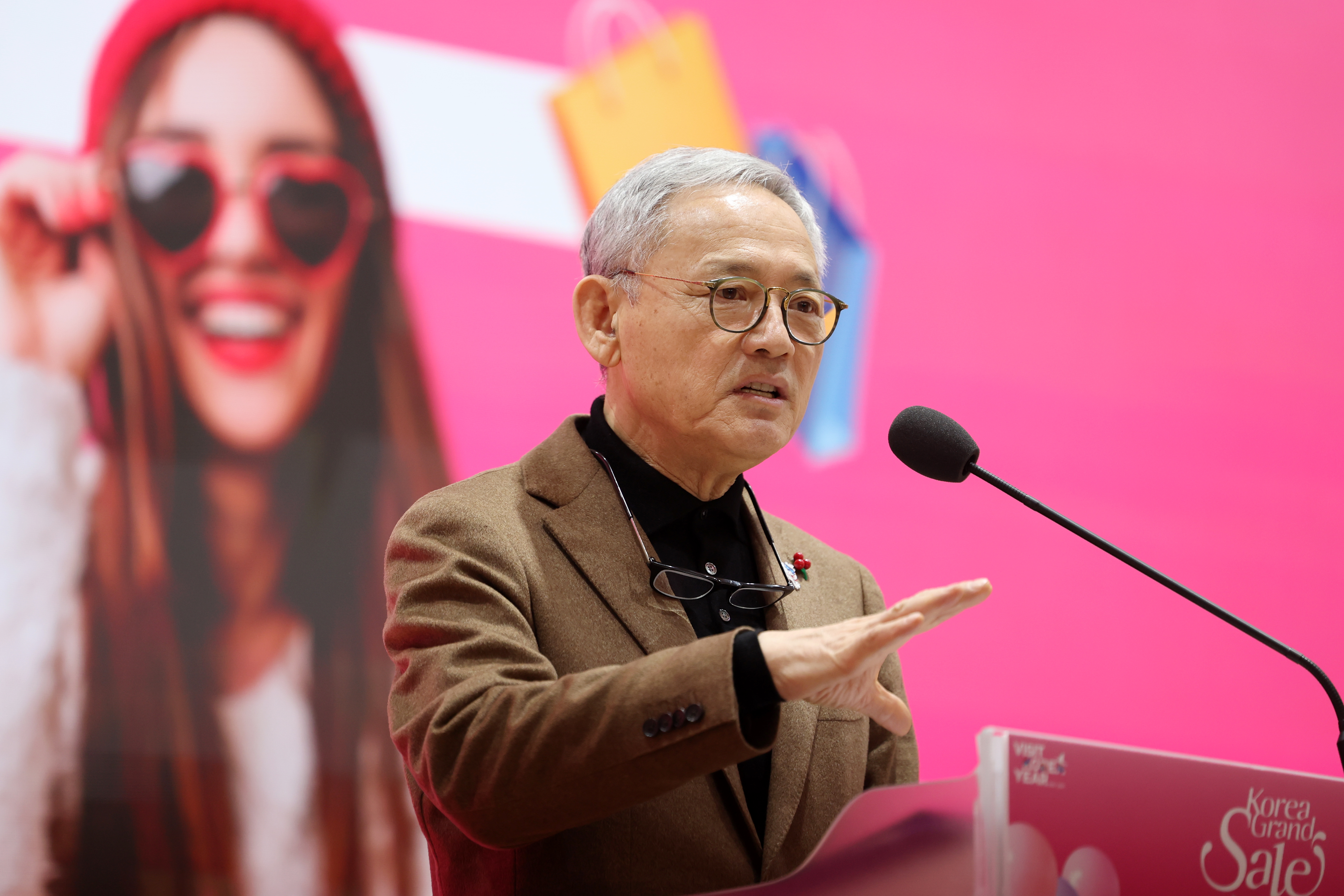
Minister Yu at the opening ceremony for 2024 Korea Grand Sale

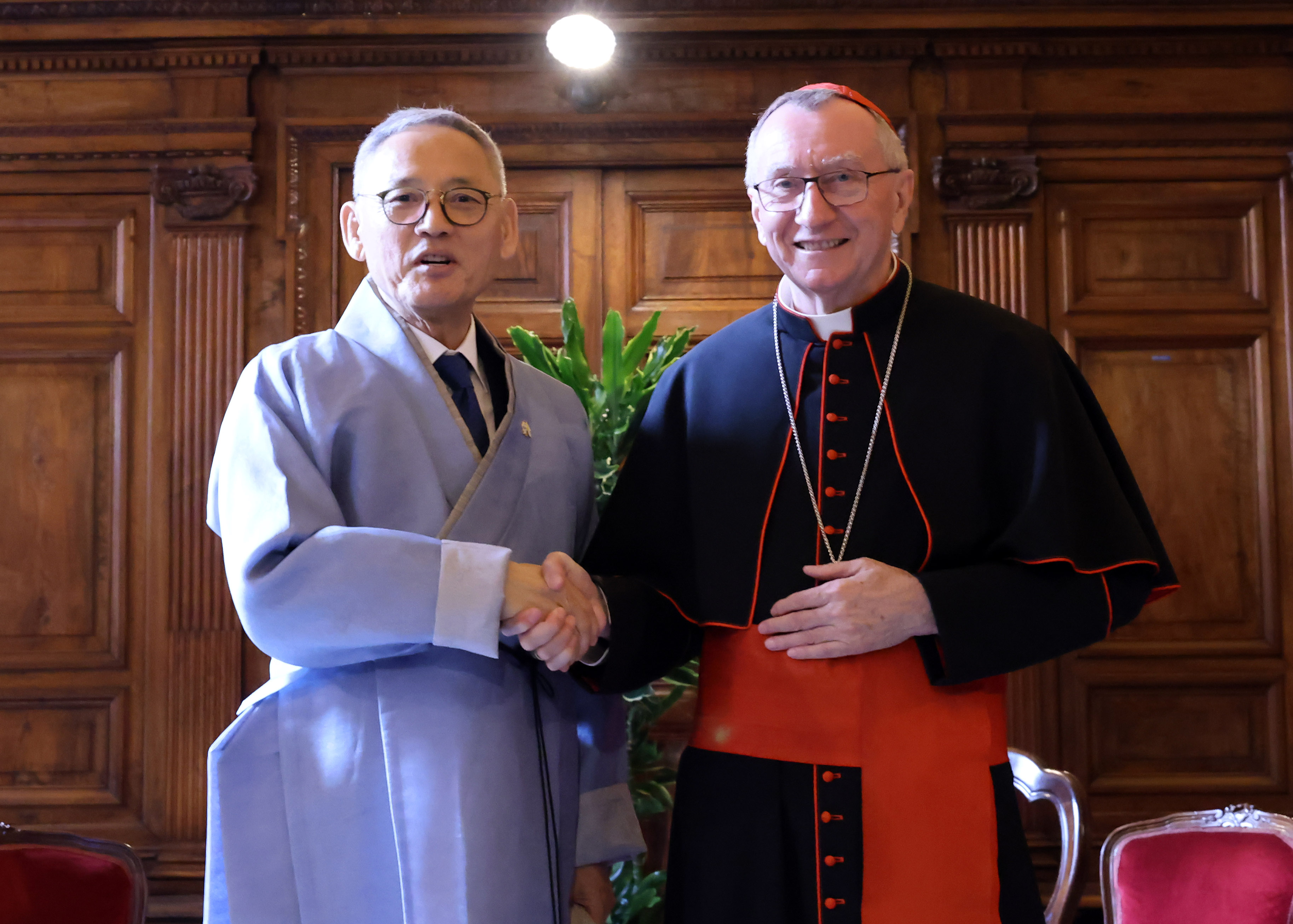
Minister Yu met with Cardinal Secretary of State Pietro Parolin to celebrate the 60th anniversary of the establishment of diplomatic relations between Korea and the Holy See.

As part of the restructuring in early 2024, the Ministry of Culture, Sports and Tourism closed the Korean Culture and Information Service, which had a history of more than 50 years, and established a dedicated office within the ministry. In addition, the ministry decided to gradually expand the role of King Sejong Institute, a Korean language learning institution. He was succeeded by Choi Hwi-Young.

== Filmography ==
=== Films ===
- Chastity (정조 Jeongjo), 1979
- Painful Maturity (아픈 성숙 Nan moleugessne), 1980
- A Battle Journal (종군수첩 Jonggun sucheob), 1981
- The Tree Blooming with Love (사랑이 꽃피는 나무 Salang-e kkochpineun namu), 1981
- The Lover of a Friend (친구애인 Chingu-ein), 1982
- The Foolish Woman (바보스러운 여자 Baboseureowun yeoja), 1983
- Rose Woman (장미부인 Jangmi buin), 1983
- Born on February 30th (2wol 30ilsaeng), 1983
- Reminiscent Flame (불의 회상 Bul-ui hoesang), 1984
- Agada (아가다 Agada), 1984
- Invited People (초대받은 성웅들 Chodaebadeun seongwungdeul), 1984
- Diary of King Yeonsan (연산일기 Yeonsan-ilgi), 1987
- Flower Blooms Even on a Windy Day (Barambuneun nal-e-do kkoch-eun pigo), 1987
- 0.917 (영점구일칠 Yeongjeomguchilil), 1987
- Aje Aje Bara Aje (아제아제 바라아제), 1989
- Honeymoon (밀월 Milwol), 1989
- Kim's War (김의 전쟁 Gim-ui jeonjaeng), 1992
- Change (체인지 Che-inji), 1996
- Firebird (Bulsae 불새), 1997)
- Doctor K (닥터K 1999)
- Sky Blue (원더풀데이즈 Wondeopeul Daei-jeu; 2003)
- Possible Changes (가능한 변화들 Ganeung-han byeonhwa-deul; 2004)

=== TV dramas ===
- Gangnam Family (1974)
- Country Diary (1980)
- Love and Truth (1984)
- Firebird (1987)
- The Years of Ambition (1990–1991) - Park Hyung-seop, inspired by Lee Myung-bak
- Mr. Jeongdeun (1992)
- Sunrise Peak (1992)
- Goblin is Going (1994)
- Bird, Bird, Blue Bird (1994)
- Jang Nok-su (1995)
- When the Salmon Comes Back (1996)
- Third Man (1997)
- The Three Kims Period (1998) - Kim Dae-jung
- Confession (2002)
- Royal Story: Jang Hui-bin (2002–03) - Lee Hang

=== Theater ===
Year	English title	Korean title	Role	Ref.
1980	Jesus Christ Superstar	지저스 크라이스트 수퍼스타	Pontius Pilate	
1981	Evita	에비타	Juan Perón	
1981	Hamlet	햄릿	Hamlet	
1983	The Merchant of Venice	베니스의 상인	Bassanio	
1983	Macbeth	맥베스		
1994	The Taming of the Shrew	말괄량이 길들이기	Petruchio	
1995	Problematic Human, Yeonsan	문제적 인간, 연산	Yeonsangun	
1996	Faust	파우스트	Devil	
1996	Padam, Padam, Padam	빠담, 빠담, 빠담	Le Pré	
1997	Taxi Driver	택시드리벌		
1997	Kholstomer	홀스또메르	Kholstomer	
1997	King Lear	리어왕		
1999	Hamlet	햄릿	Hamlet	
2015	Pericles	페리클레스	Gauer, Old Pericles	
2022	Hamlet	햄릿	Claudius	

=== Documentaries ===
- Conversations with the Past (역사스페셜)

== Awards ==
- 1980, the 16th PaekSang Arts Awards : TV부문 신인상 (안국동 아씨(MBC))
- 1986, the 22nd PaekSang Arts Awards : TV부문 인기상 (첫사랑(MBC))
- 1987, the 23rd PaekSang Arts Awards : TV부문 연기상 (불새(MBC))
- 1988, the 24th PaekSang Arts Awards : 영화부문 인기상 (연산일기)
- 1990, the 26th PaekSang Arts Awards : TV부문 인기상
- 1991, the 27th PaekSang Arts Awards : TV부문 연기상 (야망의 세월(KBS2))
- 1992, the 28th PaekSang Arts Awards : 영화부문 연기상 (김의 전쟁)
- 1993, the 29th PaekSang Arts Awards : TV부문 인기상 (일출봉(MBC))
