= Choung Byoung-gug =

South Korean politician (born 1958)

The Honourable Choung Byoung-gug MP
- 정병국
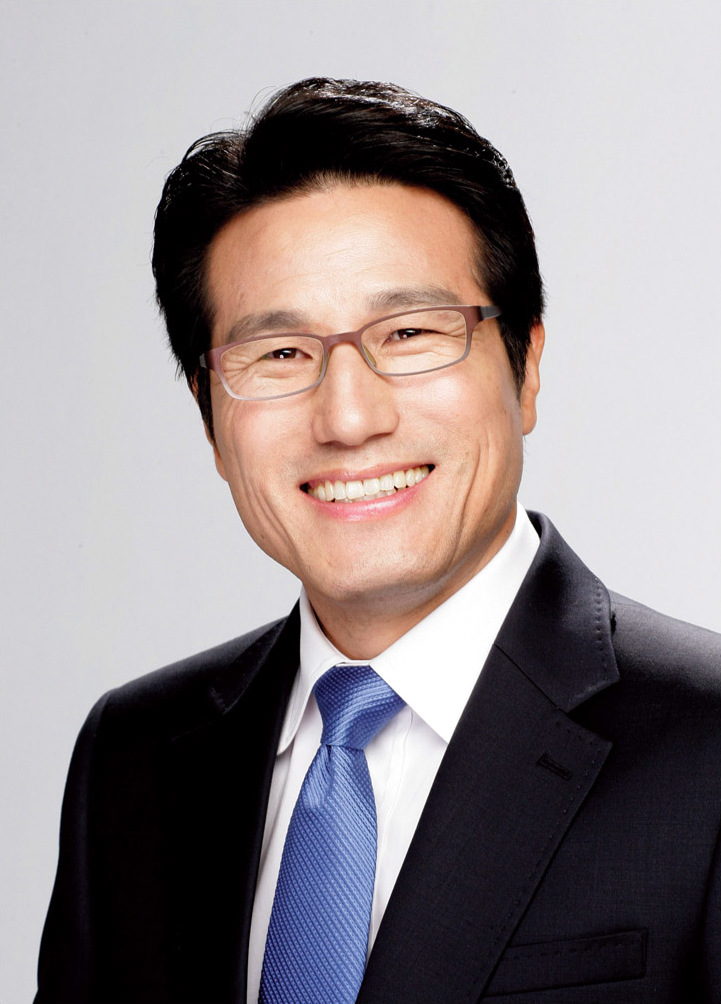

Member of the National Assembly
- In office 30 May 2000 – 29 May 2020
- Preceded by: Kim Kil-hwan
- Succeeded by: Kim Sun-gyo
- Constituency: Gyeonggi Yeoju–Yangpyeong (2016–2020); Gyeonggi Yeoju–Yangpyeong–Gapyeong (2012–2016); Gyeonggi Yangpyeong–Gapyeong (2004–2012); Gyeonggi Gapyeong–Yangpyeong (2000–2004)

Minister of Culture, Sports and Tourism
- In office 27 January 2011 – 19 September 2011
- President: Lee Myung-bak
- Prime Minister: Kim Hwang-sik
- Preceded by: Yu In-chon
- Succeeded by: Choe Kwang-shik

Personal details
- Born: 10 February 1958 (age 68) Bu-ri, Gaegun-myeon, Yangpyeong, Gyeonggi Province, South Korea
- Party: People Power Party
- Education: Sungkyunkwan University (Ph.D.)

- Choung Byoung-gug
- Hangul: 정병국
- Hanja: 鄭柄國
- RR: Jeong Byeongguk
- MR: Chŏng Pyŏngguk

Choung Byoung-gug (Korean: 정병국; born 10 February 1958) is a South Korean politician and the former Minister of Culture, Sports and Tourism. He was the leader of the centre-right Bareunmirae Party, and Chairman of the Special Committee on the 4th Industrial Revolution of the National Assembly of the Republic of Korea.

== Early life and education ==
Choung was born on 10 February 1958 in Yangpyeong, Gyeonggi Province. He initially attended Gaegun Elementary School before transferring to Jeongdeok Elementary School in Seoul against his father's will of making him stay in Yangpyeong. After graduating from Jeongdeok Elementary School in 1970, he graduated from Yongmoon Middle School in 1973 and Sorabol High School in 1977. In 1978, he enrolled in the Department of Sociology at Sungkyunkwan University.

Upon matriculation, he actively involved himself in student movements. He was wanted by the police for this reason and while he was evading the authorities in 1979, he received the news of the assassination of President Park Chung Hee, to which he responded by returning to Seoul and heading the student movement to restore the National Student Council that had been dissolved under Park's dictatorship.

Following the Coup d'état of May Seventeenth in 1980, he was arrested by Hanahoe, headed by General Chun Doo-hwan who forced him to choose between imprisonment and conscription. Choung chose conscription and volunteered for the Republic of Korea Marine Corps.

After being discharged, he graduated from Sungkyunkwan University in 1984 and actively involved himself in democratization movements. With warrants issued for his arrest, Choung ran Sein Publisher that supplied anti-government materials to student organizations of Seoul colleges, and enthusiastically supported resistance against the military government. He was subsequently arrested in June 1987 and was sentenced to eighteen months in prison. He was tortured by the Agency for National Security Planning, the forebear of the National Intelligence Service, and was released upon the suspension of execution of his sentence following the June 29 Declaration.

== Career ==
=== Before 2000 ===
Choung worked for Kim Young-sam's campaign as the Director of Public Affairs in the 1987 South Korean presidential election. After the election, he served as Kim's secretary in the Reunification Democratic Party between 1988 and 1990, and as secretary in the Democratic Liberal Party (later New Korea Party) between 1990 and 1992. With Kim's victory in the 1992 South Korean presidential election, he was appointed as staff member of the Office of the President at his age of 36, the youngest of any staff member in the Blue House.

During his time as staff member, he participated in the International Visitor Leadership Program run by the U.S. Department of State. He graduated from Yonsei University's Graduate School of Public Administration in 1998.

=== After 2000 ===
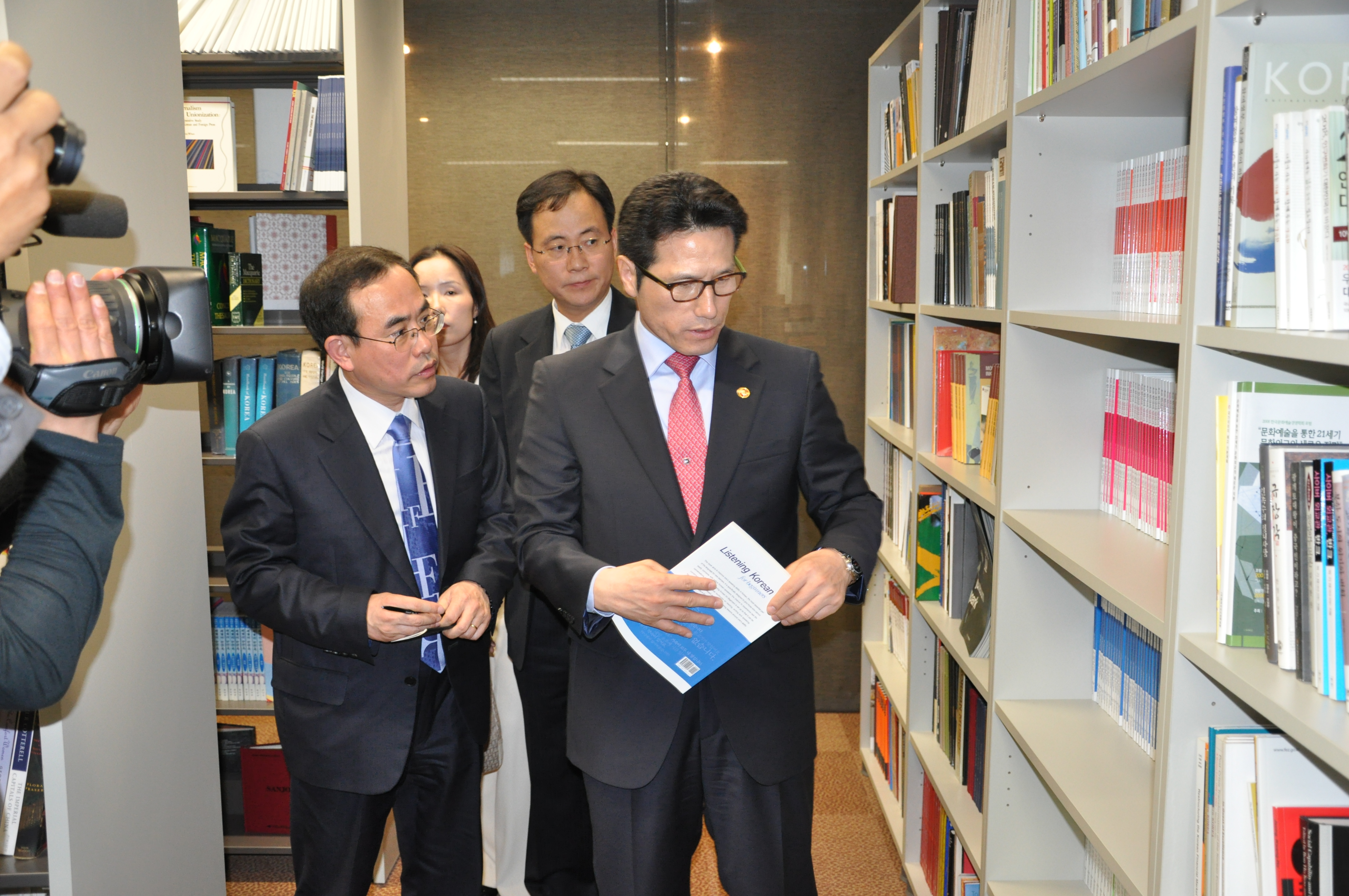
Minister Choung at the KOCIS Opening ceremony of the Korean Cultural Center in Sydney, Australia

Choung won in the 2000 South Korean General Election for the Grand National Party and was re-elected in 2004. That year, he received a Ph.D. in Political Science from Sungkyunkwan University. In 2007, he served as the Director of Public Affairs of the Grand National Party and served as its Secretary-General in 2010. He headed the Ministry of Culture, Sports and Tourism following his appointment as Minister of Culture, Sports and Tourism by President Lee Myung-bak in January 2011.

During his time as Minister, Pyeongchang won its bid for the 2018 Winter Olympics and 2018 Winter Paralympics.

Choung was elected for the fourth time in 2012 and was elected again for his fifth term in March 2016. He was one of the few Saenuri incumbents to avoid defeat in the party's disastrous performance in the said election. He is currently serving as Member of Parliament for the Yangpyeong and Yeoju district. In June 2016, he announced his candidacy as Party Leader, but lost.

=== The Bareun Party ===
With the revelations of President Park Geun-hye's political scandals that led to her impeachment, Choung and 33 other Saenuri Assemblymen exited the party. In January 2017, he and his colleagues founded the centre-right leaning Bareun Party. Choung was elected as its first Party Leader.

== List of positions held ==
- Deputy Floor Whip of the Grand National Party
- Secretary-General of the Grand National Party
- Chairman of the Standing Committee on Culture, Sports, Tourism and Media of the National Assembly (South Korea)
- 45th Minister of Culture, Sports and Tourism
- Chairman of the Special Committee on Regional Electoral Commitment of the Saenuri Party
- Chairman of the Special Committee on Military Human Rights Improvement of the National Assembly
- Chairman of the Special Committee on the 4th Industrial Revolution of the National Assembly of the Republic of Korea
- [INTERVIEW] Lawmaker helps Ethiopian coffee industry

== Election results ==
Year	Elections	Constituency	Political party	Votes (%)	Results
2000	16th National Assembly General Election	Gapyeong–Yangpyeong (Gyeonggi)	GNP	31,013 (46.32%)	Won
2004	17th National Assembly General Election	Yangpyeong–Gapyeong (Gyeonggi)	GNP	39,280 (59.00%)	Won
2008	18th National Assembly General Election	Yangpyeong–Gapyeong (Gyeonggi)	GNP	38,393 (65.03%)	Won
2012	19th National Assembly General Election	Yeoju–Yangpyeong–Gapyeong (Gyeonggi)	Saenuri	71,544 (67.46%)	Won
2016	20th National Assembly General Election	Yeoju–Yangpyeong (Gyeonggi)	Saenuri	59,625 (63.51%)	Won
