= Pak Chesang =

Korean scholar-official (fl. 5th century)

- Hangul: 박제상
- Hanja: 朴堤上
- RR: Bak Jesang
- MR: Pak Chesang

Pak Chesang (Korean: 박제상; Hanja: 朴堤上; fl. 5th century) was an official who saved the younger brother of King Nulji, the 19th king of Silla, from Wa and Goguryeo during the Three Kingdoms period.

== Lineage ==
He is also known as Kim Chesang. He was active from the time of King Naemul to the time of King Nulji. According to the historical text Samguk sagi, Pak Chesang is a descendant of Silla founder Hyeokgeose, the 5th generation descendent of Pasa Isageum, the fifth king, and his grandfather is known as King Adogalmun (阿道葛文王) and his father is Pajinchan (波珍飡) Mulpum (勿品), but this lineage is not very credible.

== History ==
In 402 A.D. (the 1st year of King Silseong), Silla dispatched King Naemul's third son Misaheun (未斯欣) to Wa (Japan), and in 412, King Naemul's second son Bokho (卜好) to Goguryeo to ask military aid. The princes' names Bokho and Misaheun are recorded in Samguk sagi. However, these names appear as Bohae (寶海) and Mihae (美海), respectively, in Samguk yusa. Wa and Goguryeo imprisoned these princes as hostages and used them politically. After ascending the throne, King Nulji, the eldest son of King Naemul, called the officials to discuss how to rescue his two younger brothers from Goguryeo and Wae. As a result, three people, Beolbomal (伐寶靺), the chief of the Suju Village, Gurinae (仇里迺), the chief of the Illi Village, and Paro (波老), the chief of the Ii Village, recommended Pak Chesang as an appropriate person with the ability to take on such a role.

At that time, Pak Chesang was in the position of Sabnyangjugan (歃良州干) as a local power in the Yangsan (梁山) region. In 418 (the 2nd year of King Nulji), he went to Goguryeo first at the king's command, persuaded King Jangsu with his speech, rescued Bok-ho, and returned to Silla safely. As soon as he returned, he shook off his wife's earnest disapproval and left to rescue Misaheun, who was held hostage in Wa. When he arrived at Wa, he deceived himself as if he had betrayed Silla and fled. Just then, an envoy from Baekje came and falsely said that Goguryeo and Silla were conspiring to invade Wa. In response, the Wa dispatched troops to invade Silla, using Misaheun and Pak Chesang as a guide. While the Japanese invaders were on their way to attack Silla, Pak Chesang cooperated with Gang Guryeo (康仇麗) and succeeded in tricking the Japanese soldiers into letting Misaheun escape. Still, he was captured and brought before the king of Wa. The Japanese king tried to persuade him with all sorts of coaxing and threats to make him a subject, but he said that he would rather be a dog or a pig in Silla, but he could never become a subject in Wa, and kept his integrity until the end. Finally, he was exiled and executed by burning.

When this fact became known to Silla, King Nulji lamented his death, posthumously honored him with Taeachan, installed his wife as the Great Lady of the State (국대부인; 國大夫人), and made his second daughter Misaheun's wife.

== Mangbusŏk tale ==
There is a tale that his wife dies while waiting for her husband who has gone to Japan, and became a stone called mangbusŏk (望夫石). The residents of the place praised her. There is a legend that Pak Chesang's wife became a bird called Chi (鵄) when she died, and her three daughters who died while waiting together became a bird called Sul (述). There is also a record of it being built. The fossil motif that people turn into stone cannot happen in reality. The word 'stone' has the meaning of a praiseworthy monument that does not change over time.

There are several stones known to be associated with this tale. One is located in Taejongdae resort, from where one can see Tsushima Island, Japan. The other is located in the Pak Chesang heritage site in Ulju, Ulsan.

== See also ==
- Naemul of Silla
- Nulji of Silla
