= Gwanchang =

Silla hwarang (645–660)

- Born: 645
- Died: 660
- Cause of death: Beheaded by Gyebaek
- Other name: Gwanjang
- Known for: Fought in the battle of Hwangsanbeol

Korean name
- Hangul: 관창
- Hanja: 官昌
- RR: Gwanchang
- MR: Kwanch'ang

Gwanchang (Korean: 관창; Hanja: 官昌; 645–660), also known as Gwanjang, was a Silla hwarang known for his actions during the Battle of Hwangsanbeol in 660, where he was killed after repeatedly charging the Baekje forces.

== Career ==
Gwanchang was born in the year 645, and his father was Pumil, a Silla general. He became a hwarang at a young age, and got along easily with other people.

=== Battle of Hwangsanbeol ===
At sixteen, he was a good horseman and archer. An official recommended him to Taejong of Silla (r. 654–661). In 660, when Silla marched out to attack Baekje together with the Tang Dynasty, he went out as a deputy commander under his father.

Gwanchang immediately charged into the enemy lines to fight but was captured. However, Gyebaek, impressed by Gwanchang's youth and bravery, did not kill him but sent him back. Yet, Gwanchang, resentful that he had failed to kill the enemy commander and seize the enemy flag, charged into the enemy lines again to fight and was captured once more. This time, Gyebaek beheaded him, hung his head from a horse's saddle, and sent him back.

== See also ==
- Kim Yu-sin
