= Dokdo Is Our Land =

1982 song by Jeong Kwang-tae

Song by Jeong Kwang-tae

from the album Funny Songs and Unfunny Songs
- Language: Korean
- Released: June 20, 1982
- Genre: Pop
- Label: Daesung Records
- Songwriter: Park Moon-young

"Dokdo Is Our Land" (Korean: 독도는 우리 땅; RR: Dokdoneun uri ttang) is a 1982 pop song written by South Korean musician Park Moon-young and sung by comedian Jeong Kwang-tae about the Liancourt Rocks dispute. The song has grown to become highly recognizable in South Korea as a point of anti-Japanese nationalism.

== History ==
"Dokdo Is Our Land" debuted on the KBS comedy program Humor Number One and was written by production directors Kim Woong-rae and Park Moon-young. On the program, it was performed by comedians Im Ha-ryong, Jang Doo-seok, Kim Jeong-sik, and Jeong Kwang-tae and was intended to be a one time performance. Following the broadcast, Daesung Records offered to record the song, but scheduling conflicts led to Jeong being the only one available for the recording. The song was released as part of the compilation album Funny Songs and Unfunny Songs (Korean: 웃기는 노래와 웃기지 않는 노래) on June 20, 1982.

Jeong Kwang-tae would receive the New Artist Award at the 1983 KBS Music Awards for his performance. The song would later be briefly banned between July and November 1983 by military dictator Chun Doo-hwan out of fear of worsening relations with Japan during Prime Minister Yasuhiro Nakasone's visit to Korea amid the 1982 Japanese history textbook controversies.

=== Re-release and remixes ===
Since its release, "Dokdo Is Our Land" has been remade and re-released several times by various artists. Following the popularity of the song, the original album would be re-released in the next year under the name Dokdo Is Our Land. The song was remade most recently in 2012 to commemorate the 30th anniversary of the song's release.

On June 5, 1985, "Dokdo Is Our Land" would be released as part of Jeong Gwang-tae's second album Jeong Gwang-tae Golden (Korean: 정광태 골든). In 1996, South Korean hip-hop group DJ DOC re-recorded the song and released it in their album "Long Live Korea" (Korean: 대한민국 만세).

== Lyrics ==
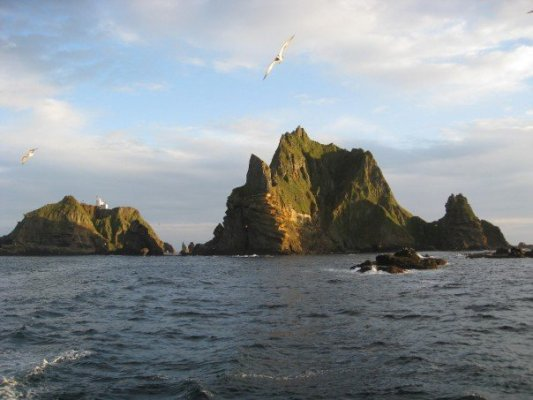
The disputed Liancourt Rocks

The lyrics of the song reference various climatic and geographical details of Dokdo, as well as historical documents justifying South Korea's claim over the islands.

== Legacy ==
The song has become highly recognizable among South Koreans as a point of national pride and anti-colonial sentiment, and is commonly used as a children's song. In 1989, Jeong Kwang-tae would be denied entry into Japan over the song. The South Korean national baseball team reportedly completed pregame workouts to the song along with other traditional Korean songs during the 2006 World Baseball Classic.

The song is also commonly used in flash mobs within South Korea as a means of promoting South Korea's claim over the islands.

The song's melody is commonly used by South Korean students as a study tool to help memorize information. In the 2019 film Parasite, an altered version of the song was sung by Choi Woo-shik and Park So-dam as a mnemonic device and would go viral on the Internet under the name "Jessica Jingle". Neon, the film's production company, would release the jingle to fans as a ringtone.

During the 2020 South Korean legislative elections, altered versions of the song were adopted as campaign songs by Hwang Kyo-ahn of the United Future Party and by Song Young-gil of the Democratic Party.

== See also ==
- Liancourt Rocks
- Dokdo Volunteer Garrison
