= National Museum of Korean Contemporary History =

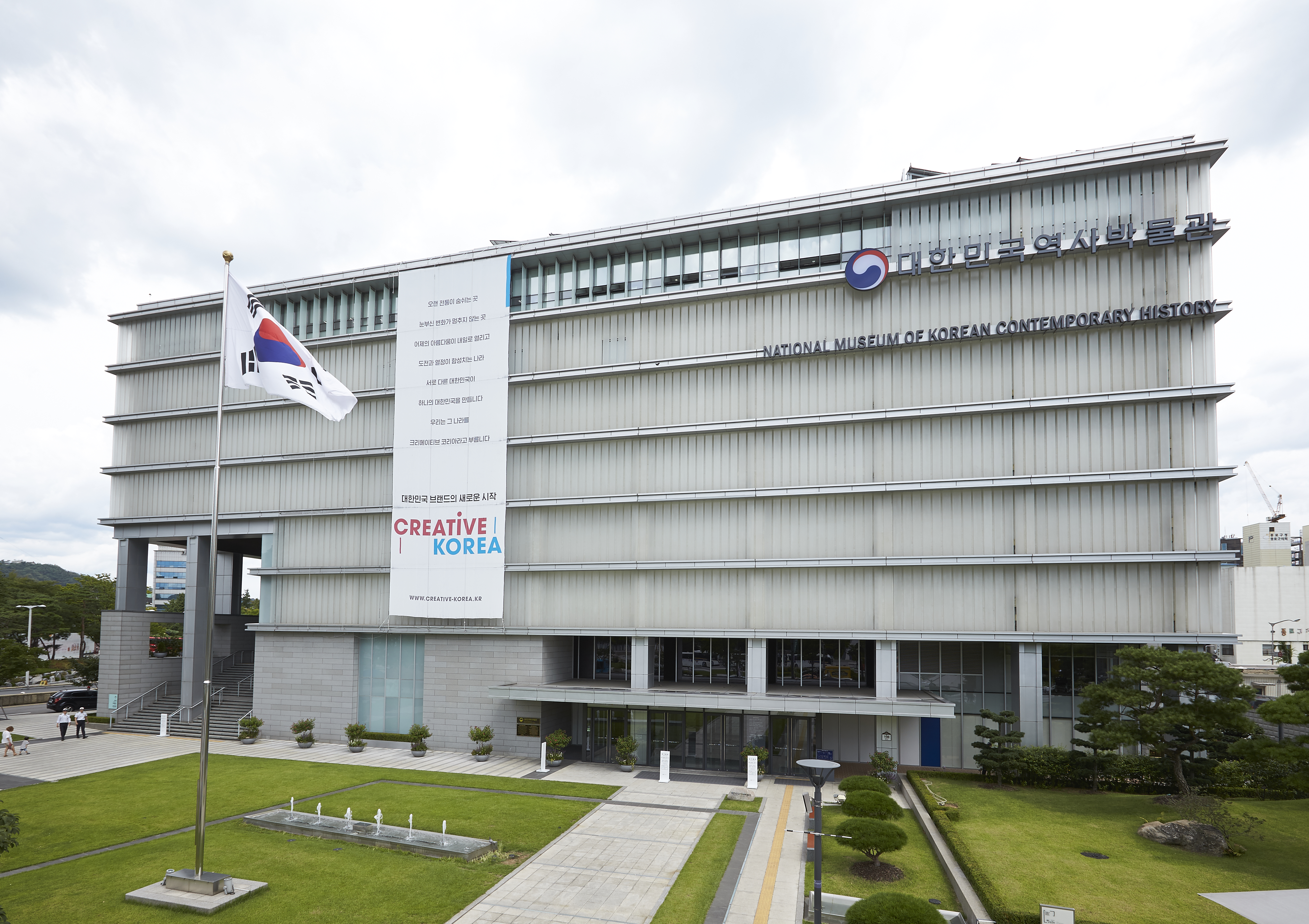

- Location within Seoul
- Established: 2012; 14 years ago
- Location: 198 Sejongdae-ro, Jongno-gu, Seoul, South Korea
- Coordinates: 37.573834°N 126.978110°E
- Type: History museum
- Collection size: 122,537+ objects
- Director: Chu Chin-Oh
- Website: www.much.go.kr

Korean name
- Hangul: 대한민국역사박물관
- Hanja: 大韓民國歷史博物館
- RR: Daehanminguk yeoksa bangmulgwan
- MR: Taehanmin'guk yŏksa pangmulgwan

The National Museum of Korean Contemporary History (Korean: 대한민국역사박물관), opened on December 26, 2012, is dedicated to researching, preserving, and exhibiting the modern and contemporary history of South Korea. The museum features four permanent exhibition halls which cover the period from the late 19th century to the present, with the themes of "Prelude to the Republic of Korea", "Foundation of the Republic of Korea", "Development of the Republic of Korea", and "Modernization and Korea's Vision of Future".

The museum includes a children's museum and a special exhibition gallery which enables visitors to explore modern and contemporary Korean history through various themes and topics. It also offers education programs and cultural events.

The museum is located near Gyeongbokgung in what was formerly the north building for USAID. Admission is free.

== History ==
- 2008-08-15: President declares plan to construct a museum on Korean modern history on Liberation Day speech
- 2009-02-11: Regulation enacted for the creation of a committee for the "National Museum of the Republic of Korea"
- 2009-04-16: Establishment of the Committee for the National Museum of the Republic of Korea
- 2009-05-04: Establishment of the Committee for the Founding of the National Museum of the Republic of Korea
- 2009-10-19: Name changed to "The National Museum of Korean Contemporary History"
- 2010-11-25: Museum's groundbreaking ceremony held
- 2012-05-23: Construction of the Museum completed
- 2012-09-01: Museum administration established
- 2012-12-17: Kim Wang-Sik takes office as the inaugural director
- 2012-12-26: Museum opens
- 2014-02-17: Museum's Education & Communication Division split into the Cultural Relations & Publicity Division and the Education Division
- 2015-07-20: Museum administratively reorganizes, establishing the Chief Curator's Office, renaming the Planning & General Affairs Division to the General Administration Division, and renaming the Research Division to the Research & Planning Division
- 2015-12-03: Extensions open for Special Exhibition Halls 1 and 2
- 2016-01-25: Kim Yong-Jick inaugurated as the 2nd Director
- 2017-11-01: Chu Chin-Oh inaugurated as the 3rd Director
