= Park Yang-woo =

South Korean politician (born 1958)

- 박양우

Minister of Culture, Sports and Tourism
- In office 3 April 2019 – 10 February 2021
- President: Moon Jae-in
- Prime Minister: Lee Nak-yeon; Chung Sye-kyun
- Preceded by: Do Jong-hwan
- Succeeded by: Hwang Hee

Vice Minister of Culture and Tourism
- In office 9 August 2006 – 29 February 2008
- President: Roh Moo-hyun
- Prime Minister: Han Myeong-sook; Han Duck-soo
- Preceded by: Yoo Jin-ryong
- Succeeded by: Kim Jang-shil

Personal details
- Born: 20 November 1958 (age 67)
- Party: independent
- Education: Chung Ang University; Seoul National University; City, University of London; Hanyang University

Park Yang-woo (Korean: 박양우; Hanja: 朴良雨; born 20 November 1958) is a South Korean professor at Chung-Ang University's Graduate School of Art previously served as President Moon Jae-in's second Minister of Culture, Sports and Tourism from 2019 to 2021.

He was previously the deputy head of the Ministry under President Roh Moo-hyun from 2006 to 2008.

After passing the state exam in 1979, he worked as a public servant at multiple agencies from the Ministry and Ministry-run Korean Cultural Center New York to Office of the President for over 20 years before leaving the public service as the deputy head of the Ministry (then Ministry of Culture and Tourism) in 2008.

He then went back to his first alma mater, Chung-Ang University, as its professor of art management and later its vice president. He also served as the president of Korean Association Of Arts Management from 2009 to 2013.

From 2013 to 2019 he served as a non-executive director with South Korean media giant CJ ENM.

In February 2021 Park served as the chair of the 14th session of the Intergovernmental Committee of UNESCO, one of its two governing bodies.

Park holds four degrees - a bachelor and a master's in public administration from Chung-Ang University and Seoul National University, a master's in Culture, Policy and Management from City, University of London and a doctorate in tourism science from Hanyang University.

== Awards ==
- Order of Service Merit by the government of South Korea (2009)
- Order of Service Merit by the government of South Korea (2000)
