= Han Sŏkpong =

Korean calligrapher (1543–1605)

- Hangul: 한호
- Hanja: 韓濩
- RR: Han Ho
- MR: Han Ho

Art name
- Hangul: 한석봉
- Hanja: 韓石峯
- RR: Han Seokbong
- MR: Han Sŏkpong

Han Sŏkpong (Korean: 한석봉; 1543–1605) was a leading mid-Joseon period calligrapher. He composed calligraphy for the royal court of Korea. His birth name was Han Ho, his courtesy name was Kyŏnghong (경홍; 景洪), and his art names were Sŏkpong (석봉; 石峯) and Ch'ŏngsa (청사; 淸沙).

Born in Songdo in the early sixteenth century, in the reign of King Jungjong, Han became a master calligrapher and the primary transcriber for King Seonjo. During his lifetime, his fame spread through Korea and even to China. One of his famous works is the Dosan-Seowon.

== Early life ==
Han Ho was born in Kaesong in 1543 in a poor family. His father was Han Ŏn'gong (한언공), and his mother was Paek Indang (백인당; 白忍堂). His grandparents were Pyŏng Cho and Han Segwan (한세관). At age 3, he learned to write with his father and his grandfather, then at 15 he continued to study with his grandfather. At age 12, he entered the clan of Yŏnggye Sinhoenam.

== Career ==
In 1567 (22 of King Myeongjong), he lived in Jinsha City at age 25. After that, in 1583 (Seonjo 16), he served as an inspector at the Saheon Department. In 1592, during the Imjin War, he went to King Saboro's hagwon (行在所) in charge of documentary affairs, and served as the head of Gapyeong-gun and Gap-gok.

As a sajagwan (writing documents), Han Ho produced major national and diplomatic documents, and traveled with the envoy to the Ming Dynastyseveral times. Han Ho was praised as the best in the East for writing with a unique and elaborate handwriting. He was often compared with Wang Hee-ji by high-ranking officials in the Ming Dynasty.

Seonjo always hung Hanho's writings on the wall to appreciate, and during the Imjin War and Jeong Yujae, Ming Dynasty admirals Yi Yŏsong (李如松) and Ma Gui (麻貴), asked Hanho to scribe documents for them.

He died in 1605.
