= Yangpyeong County =

Coordinates: 37°29′N 127°33′E

Yangpyeong
- County
- Panoramic view of Yangpyeong-eup Panoramic view of Yangseo-myeon

- Flag Emblem of Yangpyeong

- Location in South Korea
- Country: South Korea
- Region: Sudogwon
- Administrative divisions: 1 eup, 11 myeon

Area
  - Total: 877.76 km^{2} (338.91 sq mi)

Population (September 2024)
  - Total: 126,982
  - Density: 128.26/km^{2} (332.2/sq mi)
  - Dialect: Gyeonggi

Korean name
- Hangul: 양평군
- Hanja: 楊平郡
- RR: Yangpyeong-gun
- MR: Yangp'yŏng-gun

Yangpyeong County (Korean: 양평군) is a county in Gyeonggi Province, South Korea.

== Administrative divisions ==
The county administers one town (eup) and 11 townships (myeon).

Name	Korean	Hanja	Area (km^{2})	Population	Map
Yangpyeong-eup	양평읍	楊平邑	42.22	35,890	
Gangsang-myeon	강상면	江上面	37.91	10,144	
Gangha-myeon	강하면	江下面	41.42	4,904	
Yangseo-myeon	양서면	楊西面	59.59	14,002	
Okcheon-myeon	옥천면	玉泉面	66.68	8,201	
Seojong-myeon	서종면	西宗面	92.70	10,076	
Danwol-myeon	단월면	丹月面	108.03	3,970	
Cheongun-myeon	청운면	靑雲面	96.61	3,836	
Yangdong-myeon	양동면	楊東面	120.28	4,655	
Jipyeong-myeon	지평면	砥平面	77.67	7,185	
Yongmun-myeon	용문면	龍門面	102.22	18,599	
Gaegun-myeon	개군면	介軍面	32.36	5,279	

== History ==
=== Korean War ===
Yangpyeong includes the village of Jipyeong, which was a Korean War battle site.

== Climate ==
Yangpyeong has the distinction of being the coldest place in South Korea. On 5 January 1981, a record low of -32.6°C was registered in the county. Yangpyeong has a monsoon-influenced humid continental climate (Köppen: Dwa) with cold, dry winters and hot, rainy summers.

Yangpyeong

Climate chart (precipitation, max. and min. temperature)
J	F	M	A	M	J	J	A	S	O	N	D
21 2 −9	28 6 −6	45 12 −1	72 19 5	102 24 11	156 28 17	429 29 21	350 30 21	181 26 16	41 20 8	38 12 0	17 5 −6
- █ Average max. and min. temperatures in °C
- █ Precipitation totals in mm
- Source: Korea Meteorological Administration
Imperial conversion
J	F	M	A	M	J	J	A	S	O	N	D
0.8 36 17	1.1 42 21	1.8 53 31	2.8 67 41	4 76 52	6.1 83 62	17 85 70	14 86 70	7.1 80 60	1.6 69 46	1.5 53 33	0.7 40 21
- █ Average max. and min. temperatures in °F
- █ Precipitation totals in inches

Climate data for Yangpyeong (1991–2020 normals, extremes 1972–present)
Month	Jan	Feb	Mar	Apr	May	Jun	Jul	Aug	Sep	Oct	Nov	Dec	Year
Record high °C (°F)	13.6 (56.5)	20.2 (68.4)	24.4 (75.9)	31.2 (88.2)	34.4 (93.9)	36.5 (97.7)	37.6 (99.7)	40.1 (104.2)	33.4 (92.1)	30.1 (86.2)	25.5 (77.9)	17.6 (63.7)	40.1 (104.2)
Mean daily maximum °C (°F)	2.3 (36.1)	5.6 (42.1)	11.9 (53.4)	19.2 (66.6)	24.5 (76.1)	28.3 (82.9)	29.6 (85.3)	30.3 (86.5)	26.2 (79.2)	20.2 (68.4)	11.9 (53.4)	4.1 (39.4)	17.8 (64.0)
Daily mean °C (°F)	−3.4 (25.9)	−0.5 (31.1)	5.4 (41.7)	12.0 (53.6)	17.6 (63.7)	22.2 (72.0)	24.9 (76.8)	25.2 (77.4)	20.0 (68.0)	13.0 (55.4)	5.7 (42.3)	−1.3 (29.7)	11.7 (53.1)
Mean daily minimum °C (°F)	−8.6 (16.5)	−6.1 (21.0)	−0.7 (30.7)	5.1 (41.2)	11.2 (52.2)	16.9 (62.4)	21.2 (70.2)	21.3 (70.3)	15.4 (59.7)	7.6 (45.7)	0.6 (33.1)	−6.0 (21.2)	6.5 (43.7)
Record low °C (°F)	−32.6 (−26.7)	−23.5 (−10.3)	−14.0 (6.8)	−7.2 (19.0)	0.0 (32.0)	4.9 (40.8)	12.0 (53.6)	9.7 (49.5)	0.8 (33.4)	−5.8 (21.6)	−15.4 (4.3)	−24.8 (−12.6)	−32.6 (−26.7)
Average precipitation mm (inches)	17.2 (0.68)	28.0 (1.10)	38.0 (1.50)	72.5 (2.85)	94.4 (3.72)	134.2 (5.28)	409.0 (16.10)	330.9 (13.03)	144.5 (5.69)	47.1 (1.85)	46.4 (1.83)	21.4 (0.84)	1,383.6 (54.47)
Average precipitation days (≥ 0.1 mm)	5.7	5.3	6.8	7.9	8.4	9.1	15.3	14.6	8.2	6.0	7.8	6.9	102
Average relative humidity (%)	66.9	63.1	59.8	58.0	64.4	69.4	79.3	79.3	77.3	75.4	71.5	69.3	69.5
Mean monthly sunshine hours	173.2	177.2	206.5	212.2	230.8	207.1	150.3	170.9	181.2	191.6	154.0	160.9	2,215.9
Percentage possible sunshine	55.3	58.1	54.9	54.6	52.7	47.1	36.5	42.3	50.7	56.3	51.0	54.0	50.8
Source: Korea Meteorological Administration (percent sunshine 1981–2010)

== Sister cities ==
- Gangbuk-gu, Seoul, South Korea
- Songpa-gu, Seoul, South Korea

== Culture ==
=== Natural Monument ===
- Yongmunsa Ginkgo (Natural Monument No. 30)

=== Movie ===
- Introduction of Architecture (2012)

== Regional festivals ==
- Clear Water Love Festival (Every May–June)
- World Outdoor Performance Festival (Every August)
- Yangpyeong Ginkgo Festival (Every October)
- Yangpyeong Lee Bong-ju Marathon (Every June)
- Han River Riders Gran Fondo (Every Fall)

== Attractions ==
- Dumulmeori: located in Yangsu-ri, it is formed by the convergence of the South Han River and the North Han River and is a favorite place for lovers
- Semiwon
- South Han River Bike Trail

== Notable people ==
- Lee Soo-geun – South Korean comedian
- Choung Byoung-gug – South Korean politician and former member of the National Assembly for Yeoju-Yangpyeong
- JooE — member of Momoland (Originally from Seoul, South Korea)
- Kim Keon-hee – South Korean businesswoman and the former first lady of South Korea

== See also ==
- Geography of South Korea
