= Liancourt Rocks dispute =

Territorial dispute between South Korea, Japan, and North Korea

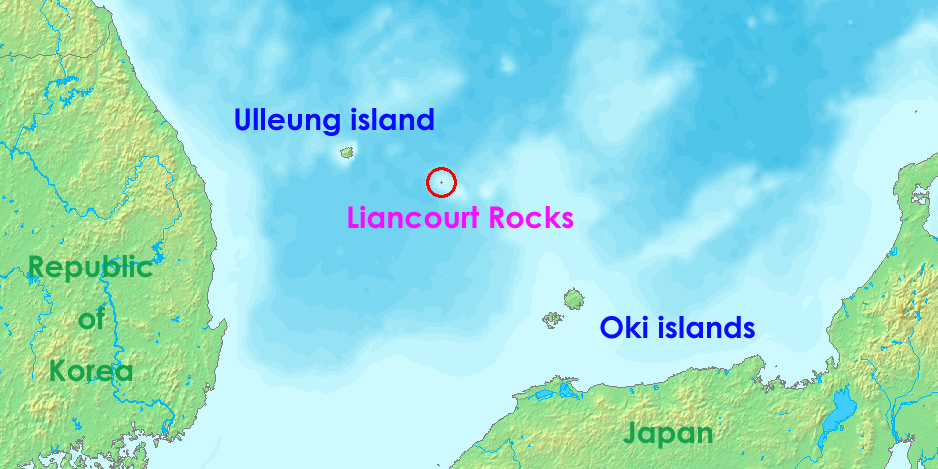
The location of the disputed Liancourt Rocks

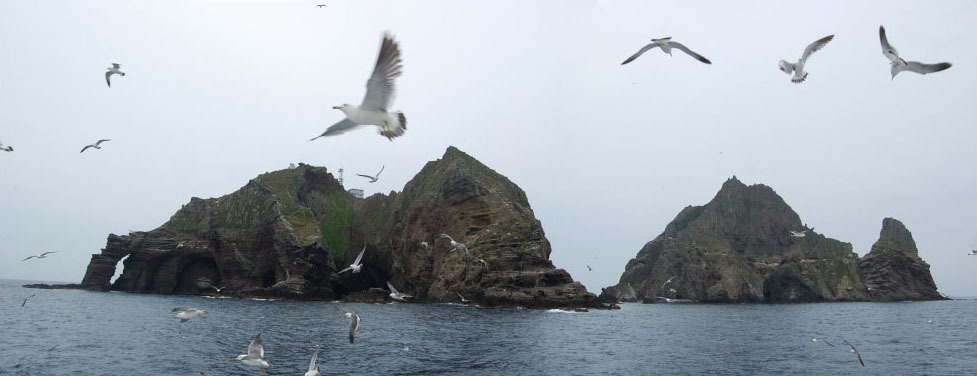
View of the Liancourt Rocks from the north side

The Liancourt Rocks dispute, also called the Dokdo dispute or the Takeshima dispute, is a territorial dispute between South Korea, Japan, and North Korea regarding sovereignty over the Liancourt Rocks, a group of small islets in the Sea of Japan. The rocks are also known in Korea as Dokdo (Korean: 독도; Hanja: 獨島) and in Japan as Takeshima (Japanese: 竹島). North Korea also formerly claimed sovereignty of the islands, but had never pursued its claim to the same extent as the others; it has, since 2024, removed its claims on the islands, as well as the rest of South Korea, following the country's abandoning of all goals of reunification and adoption of the "two hostile states theory" policy.

The Liancourt Rocks have been administered by South Korea since 1952 by the Korea Coast Guard. This was after the United States said in the Rusk documents that the Japanese claim to the Liancourt Rocks would not be renounced in Japan's post-World-War-II peace treaty. In 1954, Japan proposed a referral to the International Court of Justice. It was rejected by South Korea, which believes the Liancourt Rocks are irrefutably South Korean territory, and the dispute should not be dealt with through diplomatic negotiations or judicial settlement between South Korea and Japan.

There are conflicting interpretations about the historical state of sovereignty over the islets. Korean claims are partly based on references to a Korean island called Usan-do in various historical records, maps and encyclopedias such as the Samguk Sagi, Annals of the Joseon Dynasty, Dongguk Yeoji Seungnam (동국여지승람; 東國輿地勝覧), and Dongguk munheon bigo (동국문헌비고; 東國文獻備考). According to the Korean view, these are the Liancourt Rocks. Japanese researchers of these documents have said that the various references to Usan-do refer at different times to Jukdo, Ulleungdo, or a non-existent island between Ulleungdo and Korea. Researchers disagree on who first had administrative control over the islets due to ambiguities in early historical records and maps, owing partly to changes in the names of the islands in the area over the centuries.

== History before 1800 ==
=== The Three Kingdoms period ===
Samguk sagi (History of the Three Kingdoms) recorded that in 512, General Kim Isabu conquered Usan. Samguk sagi mentions that Usan had been an independent kingdom based on Ulleungdo.

Based on the story of Usan, contemporary chroniclers believed Usando to be the same island as Ulleungdo.

=== Joseon and Edo period ===
The Taejong-Sillok (태종실록, Annals of King Taejong) recorded that "60 people were living on Usangukdo. According to a 1417 government report, there were 86 Usando inhabitants as of 1412."

The 1417 report is as follows:

An expedition was launched under Inspector Kim Inu, and from Usando, the expedition brought back local products as tribute, including bamboo, seal skins, raw ramie cloth, silk wool, and ginger. Kim brought back three Usando natives. Kim reported that there were fifteen households living on the island, summing to the figure of eighty-six inhabitants. On their way back from the island, Kim Inu's expedition went through two typhoons, barely reaching the mainland alive.

Korean scholars argue that Usando was the Liancourt Rocks. Japanese scholars argue that Usando refers to either Ulleungdo or Jukdo.

The Sejong-sillok (세종실록, "Chronicle of King Sejong", 1432) mentions Usando:

Usando and Mureungdo [a former name of Ulleungdo], in the sea due east of Uljin Prefecture, are close enough to each other to be mutually visible in clear weather at the top of the mountain.

South Korea claims that this constitutes clear evidence that Usando refers to the Liancourt Rocks, the only island visible from Ulleungdo only in clear weather. Japan claims that the latter part is to be interpreted as "come into view from mainland Korea," and that Usando is Jukdo, located two kilometers east of Ulleungdo. South Korea counters that Jukdo is only 2 kilometers apart from Ulleungdo and therefore is visible regardless of altitude or weather, as well as that the passage is written in the context of the two islands mutually, rather than in relation to the Korean mainland ("相去不遠", "相" meaning "mutually").

South Korea also refers to Ulleungdo sajuk (울릉도 사적). This work was compiled by Korean government officer Jang Han-sang (장한상; 張漢相) in 1696 after the An Yong-bok incident under orders from the Joseon kingdom.

[From Ulleungdo,] to the west can be seen the rugged mountains of Daegwallyeong; beholding the sea to the east, I noticed a faint island in the jin direction [east-south-east], not more than one-third of the size of Ulleung, and not possibly more than 300 li [approximately 100 km] away."

A later part of the work:

I climbed to the peak of the island in order to see the boundaries of Japan, but no Japanese islands could be seen at all, and I cannot, therefore, fathom the distance to the border.

This evidence is used by South Korea to demonstrate that Koreans regarded this island to the south-east as under Korean control.

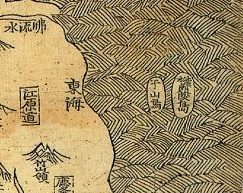
Paldo chongdo

The Dongguk yeoji seungnam (동국여지승람, "Augmented Geography Survey of the Eastern Nation (Korea)", 1481) defining Korea's territory, said that "Usando and Ulleungdo are under the jurisdiction of Uljin-hyeon of Gangwon-do as an administrative unit." It also mentions that the tree and the beach could be clearly seen on a fine day. The 1531 revision of this book includes the Paldo chongdo ("Map of the Eight Provinces"), showing two separate islands of Usan-do and Ulleung-do in the middle of the Sea of Japan. Usando is drawn to the west of Ulleungdo, but there is no island to the west of Ulleungdo.

From the early fifteenth century to the aftermath of the Japanese invasions of Korea (1592–1598), the Joseon court was unable and unwilling to maintain a civilian population on either Ulleungdo or Usando. According to the Taejong sillok ("Annals of King Taejong"), the mainland government forcibly evacuated the islands during Taejong's reign, in accordance with the "vacant island policy". Thus, the islets were only occasionally populated by permanent settlers up to the seventeenth century; a permanent population existed only on Ulleungdo. Following the war, the islands were completely vacated.

=== 1677 report ===
Takeshima tōkai yuraiki bassho hikae, written by Ōya Kyuemon, records that in 1618 the Tokugawa shogunate granted fishing rights to the Ōya and Murakawa families of Yonago, and in 1661 bestowed the feudal tenure of "Takeshima", then referred to as Ulleungdo. On the way to Ulleungdo, Japanese fishermen sometimes used the islands Matsushima (松島) as an intermediate port of call. In 1677, a retainer by the name of Saito Hessen compiled the Onshu shicho goki ("Records on Observations in Oki Province"), a set of records based upon observations he had made under orders from the daimyō of Izumo (Unshū).

Oki is in the middle of the North Sea and is called Okinoshima. Going further from there for two days and one night in a northwesterly direction, one reaches Matsushima. Also there is Takeshima at another day's travel.

These two islands are uninhabited and viewing Goryeo from there is like viewing Oki from Unshū.

As this report was compiled from a Japanese geographical perspective, Japanese scholars argue that Matsushima (the closer island) refers to the Liancourt Rocks and Takeshima (the farther island) refers to Ulleungdo. Korean scholars argue that the grants were given to permit them to travel abroad, thus the fishing area was foreign territory. These grants led to a conflict with native settlers in Ulleungdo and were later revoked by the Kampaku of Japanese Tokugawa Shogunate in 1696.

=== 1695 inquiry into Takeshima ===
In 1695 the Shogunate inquired of the Tottori clan (Tottori Prefecture today) if Takeshima (Ulleungdo) and Matsushima (Liancourt Rocks) were part of either Inaba or Hōki Province, where the Oya and Murakawa of Yonago resided.

The Shogunate inquired:

Since when has Takeshima become a part of either Inaba or Hōki? Was it before or after the year when your ancestor was given the two provinces [in 1632]? Are there any islands other than Takeshima that are within the jurisdiction of the two provinces?

The Tottori replied:

Takeshima does not belong to Inaba or Hōki. No other islands belong to the domain, including Takeshima and Matsushima.

=== 1696 Murakami document ===
Korean historical sources state that the administrator of Tokugawa shogunate reaffirmed in January 1696 that Ulleungdo and Dokdo belonged to Korea, quoting An Yong-bok's testimony. The dispute between Chosun Korea and Tokugawa Japan about the ownership of Ulleung-do ignited when Korean fishermen clashed with Japanese fishermen in Ulleungdo waters in 1692. The following year, An Yong-Bok and Park Eo-dun, representing Korean fishing communities, are variously said to have visited, drifted, or even been abducted by Japanese fishermen, arriving at Oki island in 1693. Taking this occasion, An discussed territorial title matters with a Japanese governmental official, reminding him that Ulleungdo and Jasando (자산도, 子山島 sic; a scribal corruption of Usan-do 于山島/亐山島) are Korean territory. As a result, the bakufu issued prohibitions banning Japanese fishermen from travelling to Ulleng-do. This is called the First An Yong-bok incident.

An, on being released from a two-year exile on charges of traveling to a foreign country without permission, made a second trip to Japan together with a group of Koreans from Dongnae and other maritime regions in 1696 with documents and a map to reconfirm his initial claim during the first confrontation, which had come under suspicion by the Korean government due to the Tsushima clan's delaying Edo's orders to notify the Korean government of Japan's prohibition to travel to Ulleungdo. Aware of the severe punishment which the Edo government would certainly impose on the Tsushima lord, Tsushima expedited Edo's decision to nullify "Permission to cross to Takeshima (Ulleung-do)" to the Korean government, which Edo had been withholding until An's visit. Although Japan did not mention Matsushima (Liancourt Rocks) on the prohibition papers, no Japanese could legitimately travel to either Takeshima or Matsushima until the end of the bakufu period. This document from An's second trip relays An's words that Ulleungdo, geographically subordinate to Gangwon province, was administered by Dongnae-bu. The document records the distance between Takeshima (Ulleungdo) and Matsushima (Liancourt Rocks) as 50 ri, and also states, in a rough copy of An's map of Korea, that the two islets belonged to Korea's Gangwon province. In the Annals of King Sukjong, the official governmental chronicle, An is reported to have stated that Jasan-do 子山島(sic) was what the Japanese called Matsu-shima 松島 at that time.

=== 1697 Korean court's decision to disregard Tsushima's request of a formal letter for Edo ===
In February 1697, the Korean government decided to reject Tsushima clan's request to amend a previous letter that mentioned Korea's Ulleungdo, and that An Yong-Bok's visit to Japan to raise a legal case did not require a written response from Korea since the Royal Court had no foreknowledge. These facts were to be conveyed to the Tsushima envoy's house informally: "An was an unenlightened subject who got thrown about by a storm. If he executed something, it had not been known by the Joseon Royal Court."

In March 1699, the Korean government made a formal communication in writing that An was punished for submitting a legal case against the governor of Hokishu to the Edo government without authorisation from the Korean government."

Although the Border Defense Command demanded capital punishment, King Sukjong commuted An's sentence to exile in positive consideration of his successful negotiations with the Edo government that resulted in the "prohibition of all Japanese travelling to Korea for fishing, harvesting, and lumbering for eternity".

=== 1785 Map of Three Adjoining Countries ===
A Japanese scholar of practical science, Hayashi Shihei, published "Map of Three Adjoining Countries" (三國接壤地圖) in his work "Sangoku Tsūran Zusetsu" in 1785, which showed each country in distinct colours; Joseon (old name of Korea) in yellow, Japan in green. In the map, Ulleungdo and an island to its northeast were marked "As Korean territories (朝鮮ノ持ニ)". The name of the larger island was given as "竹嶋", the current name of Ulleungdo then in Japan. According to Korean scholars, the islands to the northeast of Ulleungdo represent the Liancourt Rocks, and thus proves Liancourt belonged to Korea at the time. According to Japanese scholars, neither of these conclusions are necessary or even probable, as the Liancourt Rocks are located southeast of Ulleungdo.

== History from 1800 to 1945 ==
=== 1808 Usando, Ulleungdo, and Matsushima claimed to be the same island ===
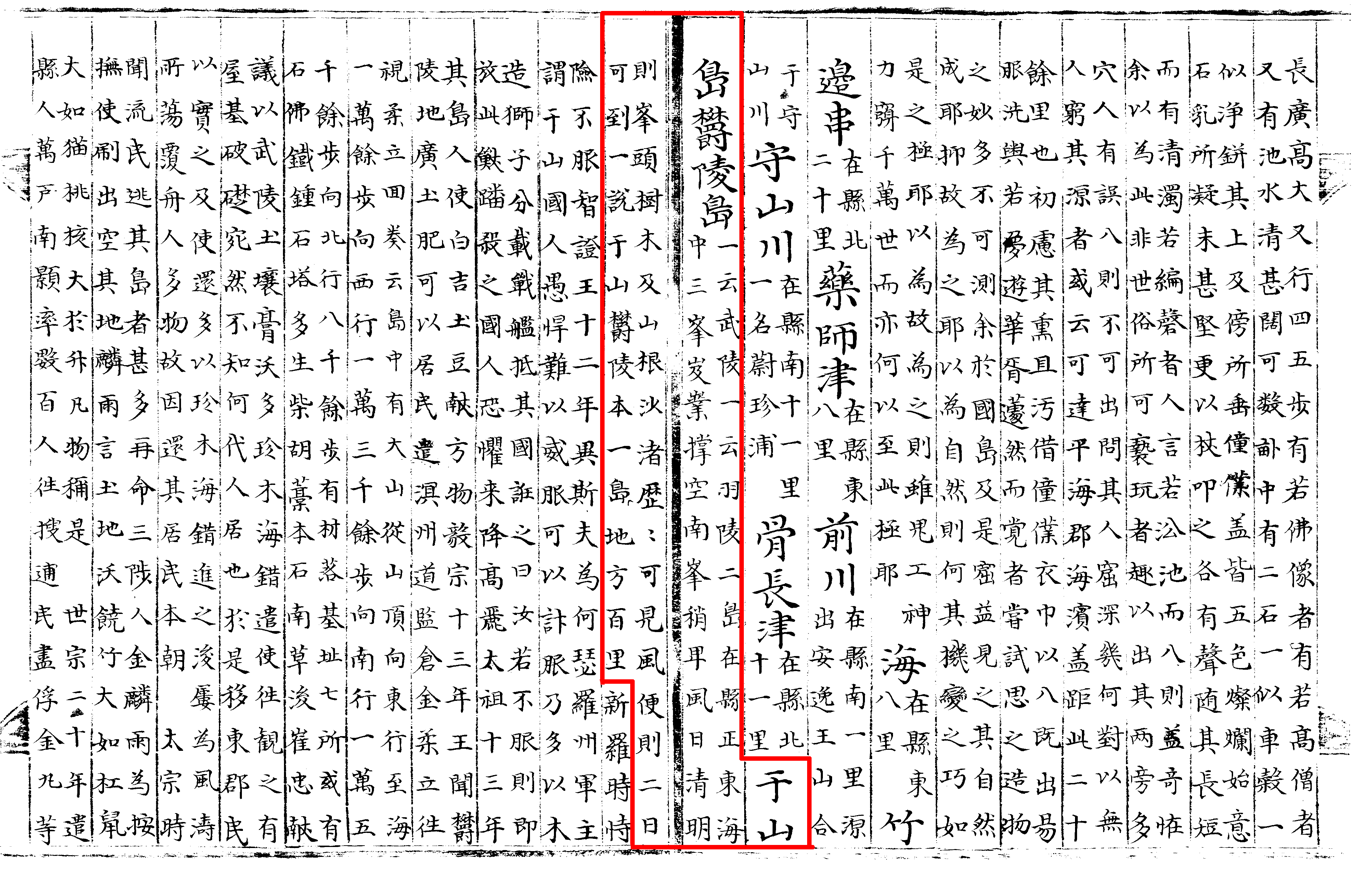
Dongguk yeojiji (1656) says "one theory has it that Usan-do and Ulleung-do are the same island" (一説于山 欝陵 本一島)

Man'gi yoram (만기요람, "Handbook of State Affairs") from 1808 quotes the earlier Yeojiji ("Gazette", 1656) that Ulleungdo and Usando all belonged to Usan'guk, and Usando was equivalent to what the Japanese then called Matsushima. However, there is no such description in the original Yeojiji. Instead, Dongguk yeojiji says "... one theory has it that Usan-do and Ulleung-do are the same island ..." as described in Donggug Yeoji Seunglam (1481).

=== 19th-century maps ===
Usando is displayed on the cartographs made by Chong Sang-gi (1678–1752); Haejwa Jeondo (1822), and Dongguk Jeondo (by Kim Tae-gon, 1821–1846). Japanese believe it to be Jukdo, noting the distance, shape, size, and direction., while Koreans believe it to be Liancourt and they said that Usando was a former name of Liancourt.

In 2011, Usando is found on the Kim Jeong-ho's Daedong Yeojido.

A US-made map of 1897 produced by an encyclopedia publisher based in New York shows Liancourt Rocks as part of Japan.

=== 1877 Daijō-kan order to exclude Takeshima (Ulleungdo) and another island from Japanese National Land Registry ===
On March 20, 1877, the Japanese Supreme Council Daijō-kan issued an order stating that Ulleungdo (then called "Takeshima 竹島", now called Matsushima 松島 by Japan) and another island (外一島) are not under Japanese rule. Korea states that "another island" (外一島) besides Ulleungdo refers to Liancourt Rocks and considers this order as an evidence that Liancourt Rocks was under the control of Korea. The Japanese government has not made any comment on this point whereas some Japanese consider that "another island" (外一島) does not refer to Liancourt Rocks.

=== 1900 Korean Imperial Decree No. 41 separates Uldo Archipelago from Uljin County ===
On October 25, 1900, Korea issued Imperial Decree No. 41, which included the following administrative actions.

- Ulleungdo, which had been subordinate to Uljin Prefecture since the reign of King Sejong, shall be renamed Uldo and elevated to county.
- Uldo County office shall rule over all of Uldo proper and its dependencies including Jukdo and Seokdo.

The decree was published in Official Gazette No. 1716 (관보 제1716호) on Oct 27 and distributed to the international community, including Imperial Japan, with representations in Seoul.

This decree states that Ulleungdo be renamed to Uldo (mod. Ulleungdo), and that the county hall shall govern Ulleungdo, Jukdo, and Seokdo. Japan says that there is no evidence to identify the island "Seokdo" as Liancourt Rocks, and that there is no record that proves the effective occupation by Korea before Japanese Cabinet decision of January 28, 1905. Korea claims that the island "Seokdo" mentioned in this document is Liancourt Rocks, and thus Liancourt Rocks was still officially part of Korea as an ancient territory since 512. Korea presents evidence that Koreans living on Ulleungdo referred to Liancourt Rocks as Dokseom (or Dolseom; literally "rocky island") in speech and Dokdo 獨島 in writing as a phonetic transcription (음독 音讀, umdok; おんよみ 音読み on-yomi), while the name "Seokdo" 石島 ("rocky island") in the Ordinance was an instance of logographic translation (훈독, 訓讀, hundok; くんよみ 訓読み kun-yomi).

Korea also states that Liancourt Rocks was effectively managed by seasonal fishermen and divers in recent times as a result of King Gojong's Ulleungdo Reclamation Program (鬱陵島開拓令) issued in Dec 1881. A first-person account by one of the first settlers since the reclamation program has been presented as one evidence to the fact of the claim. A South Korean scholar claims to have uncovered evidence that Korean fishermen effectively occupied engaged in "whaling" in Liancourt Rocks waters in the 1880s and that sea lions were hunted and sea-lion-derived products were exported to Japan in 1904 prior to the Japanese Cabinet decision of 1905 to incorporate a supposed terra nullius.

=== 1904 Japan–Korea treaty ===
The Japan–Korea Protocol of 1904 (Korean: 한일의정서; Hanja: 韓日議定書; RR: Han'il uijongso; Japanese: 日韓議定書, romanized: Nikkan Giteisho) signed between Japan and Korea on February 23, 1904, stipulates in article 3 that Japan shall guarantee the territorial integrity of Korea. It further stipulates in article 4 that, in case the territorial integrity of Korea is endangered by aggression of a third power, Korea shall give full facilities to promote the action of Japan, and that Japan may occupy, when the circumstances require, such places as may be necessary for strategic reasons.

Article 4 of the treaty has been quoted as giving Japan full authorisation in terms of international law in taking Liancourt Rocks as a strategic surveillance point during the Russo-Japanese War. Article 3, however, has been quoted as preventing Japan from appropriating Liancourt Rocks post bellum, and hence ruling the 1905 Shimane incorporation illegal after the end of the war. Although the watch tower on Liancourt Rocks was demolished, suggesting the necessity on strategic reasons had disappeared, the Japanese Cabinet decision to incorporate Liancourt Rocks had not been revoked in violation of the treaty. This suggests foreign military threat from a third country in Article 4 was not the primary ground of incorporating Liancourt Rocks, but South Korea claim that "its own violence and greed that Japan is expected to disprove with prima facie evidence in the manner of which the act of incorporation was committed."

=== 1905 Japanese incorporation of Liancourt Rocks ===
The imperial government of Japan incorporated Liancourt Rocks as a result of a Cabinet decision in early 1905. Three motives are commonly cited for this decision:

- civilian occupation of said islets by a Japanese citizen from Oki, Nakai Yozaburo (なかい よざぶろう 中井養三郎; 1864–1934),
- practical necessities arising from the armed conflict with Russia,
- and Japan's foreign policy regarding Korea as its western frontier to fend off encroaching foreign powers.

The incorporation was conducted incognito to foreign nations, including Korea, as the decision had never been announced by the central government to the international community. The Korean response to reports of the verbal notice by a local Japanese official were shock and disbelief, and orders were issued to investigate the truth of the report. While the result of the investigation is obscured in silence, apparently lending momentum to the Japanese claim, the Japanese Resident-General residing in Seoul, in 1906, makes an inquiry into which islands are administered by Ulleungdo (sic.), in the older designation prior to the 1900 Korean Imperial Decree No 40, to which the Internal Ministry relays facts consistent with the 1900 Imperial Decree No 41, to wit Uldo County administers Uldo proper, Jukdo, and Seokdo.

==== 1903–1904 Nakai's fishing enterprise ====
On September 29, 1904, Nakai Yozaburo (中井養三郎; 1864–1934) of Saigo, Shimane Prefecture, experimenting with sea lion hunting business in the summers of 1903 and 1904, and wanting to protect his investment, submitted a petition to incorporate Liancourt Rocks and to issue exclusive license to hunt sea lions for ten years. The petition was submitted to the Home Ministry, the Ministry of Foreign Affairs, and the Ministry of Agriculture and Commerce. Nakai, initially believing Liancourt Rocks to be Korean territory, had planned to ask for a lease from the Korean government via the Ministry of Trade and Commerce. An officer of the Ministry of Home Affairs considered it unwise to incorporate Liancourt Rocks, as it was suspected to be Korean territory, but the Navy and the Foreign Ministry advised incorporation would be profitable, and that there would arise no diplomatic repercussions.

==== 1905 Japanese cabinet decision on Liancourt Rocks ====
The Japanese government's official view has evolved since 1905. On January 28, 1905, the Cabinet reached a decision (明治三十八年一月二十八日閣議決定 lit. 'Cabinet decision on January 28, Meiji 38') to incorporate Liancourt Rocks, on grounds that it had been terra nullius under international law: "There is no recognizable trace that this uninhabited island was ever occupied by a foreign country ... As evidenced through relevant records that a person by the name of Nakai Yozaburo (中井養三郞) moved to said island in 1903 (Meiji 36) and practiced fishing there since, we recognise the fact that occupation has occurred in terms of international law."

From 1947 to 1954, the Japanese government's claim shifted from prior occupation of a terra nullius to effective occupation by "executing state intention to acquire territory".

Not later than 1962, Japan again shifted its claim to "[the 1905] reconfirmation of title to an inherent/ancient territory", all based on Japan's changing interpretation of the same Cabinet decision document, all the while carefully avoiding its previous claim of incorporation on grounds of prior occupation of a terra nullius.

Korea also claims that Japan's 1905 claim to terra nullius conflicts with its previous recognition (i.e., the 1877 Daijō-kan order) of the islets as Korean territory.

==== 1905 Shimane Notice 40 ====
Japan claims to have enforced its Cabinet decision of January 28, 1905, to incorporate the islets as part of Shimane Prefecture (島根縣) in Shimane Prefectural Notice No. 40 of February 22, 1905 (島根縣告示第40號). The decision was reported in a local newspaper, San-in Shimbun, on February 24, 1905.

The incorporation came in the heat of the Russo-Japanese War and before the Japan–Korea Treaty of 1905 of November 17, 1905, when Korea became Japan's protectorate. A temporary watchtower was erected on the islets for anti-Russian surveillance purposes, which was demolished after Japan's victory in the war.

==== 1906 verbal notification of incorporation and Korean response ====
Japanese claims the incorporation was legitimate in that Korea did not dispute the incorporation when the news was published. Korea claims the incorporation was invalid in that the Feb 24 San-in Shimbun report lacked official status as its circulation was limited to the Shimane prefectural region. Korea claims neither the decision of the Japanese Cabinet, the order of Ministry of Home Affairs, nor the Shimane Notice had been announced to the Korean government until March 28, 1906. Many Japanese, including petitioner Nakai Yozaburo (中井養三郞), and certain governmental officials believed the title of Liancourt Rocks belonged to Korea.

On that date, a party of 44 officials from Shimane Prefecture visited Ulleungdo. The Japanese officials, including Kanda Yoshitaro, travelled to Ulleungdo by way of Dokdo, and informed Sim Heung-taek, then Magistrate of Ulleungdo, that the rocks had been incorporated into Japan.

According to Korean historians, Sim immediately contacted Yi Myeong-nae, then Governor of Gangwon Province. Yi then forwarded the report to the State Council Minister of the Korean Empire. State Council Minister Bak Je-sun, in Directive No. 3 issued on May 20, 1906, stated, "It is totally groundless that Dokdo has become Japanese territory," and went on to order "an investigation and report on the situation and on what the Japanese have done." The Japan–Korea Treaty of 1905 had stripped Korea of all its diplomatic rights on November 17, 1905. Five years later, Korea was fully annexed by Japan.

==== 1906 communication between Japanese Resident-General and the Korean government ====
In 1906, a curious inquiry and reply are exchanged between Japanese and Korean officials, the result of which is reported in the edition of July 13 of Hwangseong Shinmun. In the letter, says the report, the Japanese Resident-General asks which islands are administered by Ulleung Island. The Korean Home Ministry simply lists the same islands as in the 1900 Decree specifying Seokdo, which Korea claims to be Liancourt Rocks. It also adds a physical measurement of what is believed to be Ulleung Island.

The Japanese inquiry is not current with the 1900 Korean Decree in its inaccurate designation of place names and offices, while the Korean reply remains silent on the issue of incorporation of Liancourt Rocks. The details of the reasons for the Resident-General's inquiry and the Korean government's judgement regarding the inquiry are not known.

Prior to the Resident-General's inquiry and the Korean government's response reported on July 13, daily newspapers Hwangseong Shinmun (May 9, 1906) and The Korea Daily News (May 1, 1906) had denied the rumoured Japanese local official's claim of incorporating Liancourt Rocks. "Their claim to Dokdo as Japanese territory is totally groundless; the story is really shocking." Although Hwangseong Shinmun had clearly declared that rumours of the Japanese incorporation of Liancourt Rocks were baseless two months before the July communication, and although the July communication reminded the Resident-General, Itou Hirobumi, of the 1900 Imperial Decree reaffirming Korea's state authority over Liancourt Rocks, there is no evidence that the then Resident-General or any other representation of Imperial Japan raised a formal objection to it.

=== 1920 Korean Provisional Government mention ===
On March 1, 1920, on the first anniversary of the March 1st Movement, Prime Minister of the Korean Provisional Government (KPG) Yi Dong-nyeong accused the Japanese government of illegal incorporation of Liancourt Rocks of 1905.

== History from 1945 to 2000 ==
=== Post World War II era ===
The recent dispute stems largely from conflicting interpretations of whether Japan's renunciation of sovereignty over its occupied territories after World War II included the Liancourt Rocks.

On January 29, 1946, the Supreme Commander of the Allied Powers (SCAP) Instruction 677 listed the Liancourt Rocks, along with many other islands, as part of those territories over which Japanese administration was to be suspended. In the first to fifth drafts of the Treaty of San Francisco between Japan and the Allied powers, Liancourt Rocks was described as part of Korea.

The sixth and seventh drafts, made on December 29, 1949, and August 7, 1950, respectively, ruled that Liancourt Rocks belonged to Japan.

The U.K. draft and the attached map reflecting the view of Commonwealth nations submitted April 7, 1951, excluded Liancourt Rocks from Japanese territorial definition and placed Liancourt Rocks within Korean territory:

Japanese sovereignty shall continue over all the islands and adjacent islets and rocks lying within an area bounded by a line ... bearing north-easterly between ... the islands of Oki-Retto to the south-east and Take Shima to the north-west.

Finally, the U.K. agreed to the US version of the treaty excluding the islands of Quelpart, Port Hamilton and Dagelet from Japan.

The September 1951 version left the territorial title of Liancourt Rocks undefined between Japan and signatory states.

Article 1

(b) The Allied Powers recognize the full sovereignty of the Japanese people over Japan and its territorial waters.

Article 2

(a) Japan recognizing the independence of Korea, renounces all right, title and claim to Korea, including the islands of Quelpart, Port Hamilton and Dagelet.

In December 1951, the SCAP Instruction 677/1 amended the 1964 SCAP Instruction 677 to define the Ryukyu Islands as part of Japan for the purpose of Instruction 677, and Japan was directed to resume jurisdiction over the Ryukyu Islands. The directive continued to forbid Japan from exercising authority over the Liancourt Rocks.

Korea claims that its territorial title to Liancourt Rocks was returned to Korea with the Surrender of Japan which was enforced by SCAP's prohibitions suspending Japanese access to within 12 miles (19 km) from said island which needs to be explicitly revoked in order to effect a change. Such a change modifying the status of Liancourt Rocks has never occurred before "SCAP transferred its jurisdiction ... to the United States Army Military Government in Korea on January 29, 1946." The U.S. Military Government in Korea, in turn, reverted all jurisdiction over Liancourt Rocks to the Government of South Korea when it launched on August 15, 1948. South Korea's President Rhee Syngman's announcement of the Peace Line enforced Korea's territorial title to Liancourt Rocks.

In US–UK discussions on the draft treaty in April 1951, US negotiators favoured a format under which Japan would recover full sovereignty, with only such islands as were necessary excluded from Japan by name.

==== Early Japanese efforts to claim Liancourt Rocks and Ulleung Island ====
Both countries submitted petitions and documents to persuade the Allied Powers to rule the Liancourt Rocks dispute in their favour. The Japanese government's Foreign Office submitted a series of documents, issued from November 1946 to June 1947, entitled Minor Islands Adjacent to Japan Proper; Parts I-IV, of which Part IV, Minor Islands in the Pacific, Minor Islands in the Sea of Japan described Utsuryo-shima (Ulleungdo) and Take-shima (Dokdo, Liancourt Rocks) as Japanese territory. This document largely based on material prepared by Kawakami Kenzo 川上健三, the then treaties expert for Japanese Foreign Office, argued for the Japanese title to Dagelet Is and Liancourt Rocks in the following words:

- Chapter II. Minor Island in the Japan Sea

- Introduction

- "Liancourt Rocks and Dagelet Is lie off the Tsushima Strait [are] some 50 miles (80 km) apart."
- "The existence of these islands was known to Japan in early times."
- The Japanese names for these two islands were reversed due to the cartographic error of a German Dutch physician Philipp Franz von Siebold.

- I. Liancourt Rocks (Take-shima)

- 1. Geography

- Liancourt Rocks are 86 miles (138 km) from Oki Islands of Shimane Prefecture.

- 2. History

- "[T]he Japanese knew the existence of the Liancourt Rocks from the ancient times."
- "The earliest documentary evidence is Inshu Shicho Goki" of 1667.
- "While there is a Korean name for Dagelet, none exists for the Liancourt Rocks."
- "They are not shown in the maps made in Korea."

- 3. Industry

- "It is presumed no one has ever settled on the islets."
- "In 1904, the inhabitants of Oki islands began to hunt sea-lions on these islets."
- "[E]ach summer, the islanders, using Dagelet as their base, went regularly to the Rocks and built sheds as temporary quarters for the season."

- II. Dagelet Island (Matsu-shima, Utsuryo or Ul-lung Island)

- 1. Geography

- "Dagelet Island is equidistant from the port of Fushan (Busan) and the port of Sakai of Tottori Prefecture of Japan."
- "The flora of this island ... is recognized to have many common features with Japan Proper."
- "The cultivation in Japan of the Take-shima lily (Lilium hansonii), an indemic plant of the island, is mentioned in a book published in 1710, a fact which points to an early intercourse between the island and Japan."

- 2. History

- In Japanese documents ... reference was made as early as 1004 to Uruma Island, an old Japanese equivalent for Ul-lung Island."
- "The Korean Government from 1400 and onward adhered for a long time to a policy of keeping it uninhabited ... the island was thus virtually abandoned by the Korean Government."

Many of these claims, regardless of their historical verity, and without critical historical review, were emphasised by William J. Sebald, the then political advisor for SCAP in Tokyo, which eventually had a strong formative influence on the position maintained by the Diplomatic Section of SCAP and the US State Department regarding the territorial aspect of the Peace Treaty.

Educated neither as an historian nor a geographer, Kenzō Kawakami (川上健三, Kawakami Kenzō) went on to build on this early investigation supporting the Japanese claim in a work called An Historical and Geographical Study of Takeshima (竹島の歴史地理学的研究, Takeshima no Rekishi Chirigakuteki Kenkyū) for the Japanese Ministry of Foreign Affairs published in 1966, in which he said:

- Koreans on Ulleungdo could not see the Liancourt Rocks, due to the heavy forestation on Ulleungdo
- Koreans were not aware of the Liancourt Rocks before the 20th century, as seen in the lack of documents pertaining to the Liancourt Rocks
- Koreans did not have adequate naval navigation to reach the Liancourt Rocks.

Adherents including Masao Shimojo (下條 正男, Shimojo Masao), Kunitaka Tanaka (田中 邦貴, Tanaka Kunitaka), and Gerry Bevers have presented arguments building on Kawakami's arguments. Recent studies by numerous Korean and Japanese scholars such as Baek In-ki (백인기), Shim Mun-bo (심문보), Yu Mirim (유미림), Lee Han-key (이한기), Wada Haruki 和田春樹, and Jeong Taeman (정태만) have disproved many of the claims.

- Visibility of Liancourt Rocks from Ulleungdo is attested in history, in theory and from observation

- Koreans already possessed the skills to reach Ulleung-do from mainland Korea since not later than the 6th century.

- Koreans transmitted advanced shipbuilding/navigational technology to the Japanese from early historical times.

==== Early Korean efforts to claim Liancourt Rocks as an appendage or dependency to Ulleung Island ====
A corresponding Korean effort came on August 5, 1948, ten days before the inauguration of the South Korean government. It was led by a private organization self-styled "Patriotic Old Men's Association", which was led by a former military leader of the KPG Cho Seong-hwan.

They petitioned for the sovereignty of Docksum (Liancourt Rocks), Ullung Do, Tsushima and Parang islands The Headquarters of the Patriotic Men's Association made the following statements to back up Korea's claim to sovereignty over Ulleung Is and Liancourt Rocks:

- Request for Arrangement of Lands between Korea and Japan
- I. Returning ... the island "Docksum."

- "'Ulneungdo' and its attached ... belong ... to Korea historically."
- "Japan planned to profit by fishing and foresting under the evacuation policy."
- "Resolute negotiation ... Japan acknowledged their fault and made a word to prohibit to fish there in 1693."
- "Since 1881, Japan began to reinvade ... Under the negotiations in Tokyo ... by plenipotentiary Suh Sang Woo and ... advisor G. von Mollendorf, Japan surrendered to Korea."
- Japan, never dismiss[ing] the fishing profit around Ulneungdo, ... planned to occupy a corner of it... and became to find out a small island called 'Docksum' ... near the Ulneungdo, where whales gathered."
- "In 1904, a Japanese fisher of Tottoriken named Nakai Yosaburo made a cruel program to seize the Docksum and ... submit[ed] petitions or requests to the Hydrographic Department of Navy, Dep't of Home Affairs, Dep't of Foreign Affairs and Dep't of Agriculture and Commerce ... to register the island into Japanese territory."
- "The so-called Takeshima is the very Dockusum (sic) in Korean name."
- "This is namely Liancourt Rocks on the world's chart."
- "This name "Liancourt-Rocks" was established due to the name of the French whaler which found ... the island. Thereafter, by the Russian warship 'Paleada' in 1854, and by the English warship "Hornet" in 1855, the said island was re-found and the ship's name was given to it."
- "But it was never suspected that these variously named island was the very island "Ulneungdo."
- "It is ... said that a Japanese district office carried out such a plan imposing upon the world."
- "Such an island occupied illegally by Japan should be returned to Korea."

The document's clear identification of Liancourt Rocks with "Docksum" in the Korean vernacular language is curiously ignored by William Sebald, whose office relayed a facsimile copy to the US State Department. The document is unique in its logical treatment of Liancourt Rocks as an appendage or dependency to Ulleung Is as can be seen in the statement: "these variously named island was the very island 'Ulneungdo'" although some scholars believe the prerequisite to unity theory needs a qualification before it can be applied to the case of Liancourt Rocks.

==== First US bombing incident over Liancourt Rocks ====
SCAP designated Liancourt Rocks as a bombing range (SCAPIN #1778), and notified the Japanese government on September 16, 1947. On June 8, 1948, 29 US B-29 bombers flew from Kadena, Okinawa, and dropped 76 bombs in a bombing exercise over the Liancourt Rocks. The South Korean government announced that 16 civilians were killed by the US military drill. In a report before the Korean National Assembly in 2001, Hong Sung-Geun, an international jurist, estimated 30–100 civilian deaths, and damages to 30–80 fishing boats. Two alleged bombing survivors claimed in 1995, that 80 boats were destroyed, and inferred thence that 150–320 people were killed that day.

FEAF's Report on Bombing of Liancourt Rocks, written in September 1948, stated that bombing occurred because subordinate units mistakenly identified Liancourt Rocks as an insular part of Japan "although definitely established in September 1947 that Liancourt Rocks was a part of Korea."

==== Classified US communication to South Korean government ====
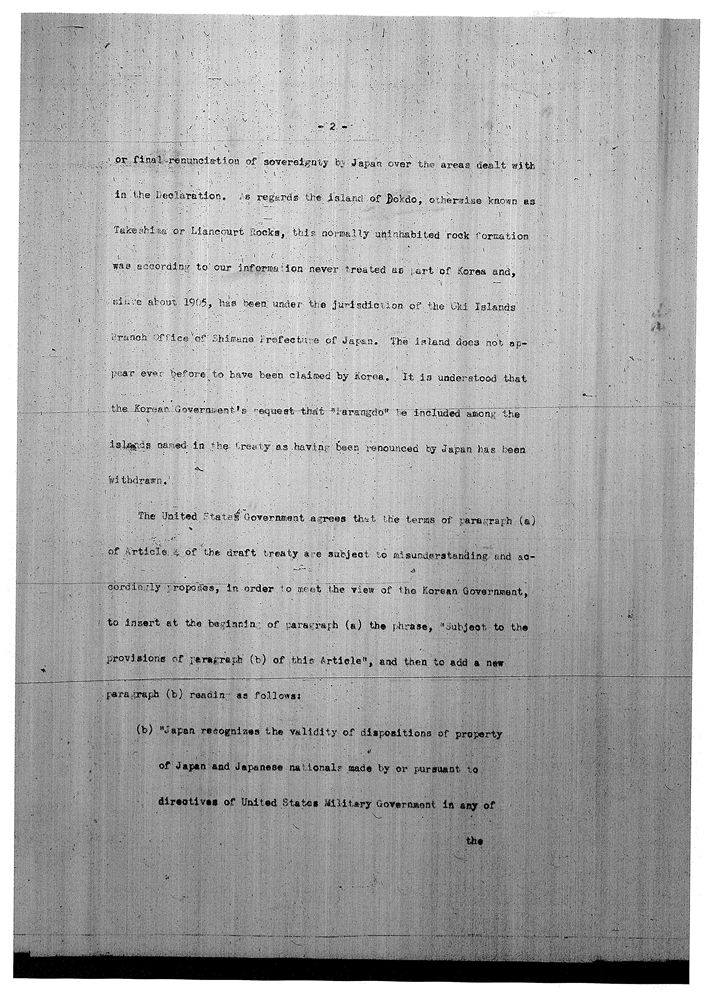
Rusk Documents

On August 10, 1951, a secret correspondence currently known as the Rusk documents was sent to South Korea communicating the then U.S. position on issues of territorial sovereignty in the Peace Treaty explaining why the US believed Liancourt Rocks were Japanese territory: "[T]his normally uninhabited rock formation was according to our information never treated as part of Korea and, since about 1905, has been under the jurisdiction of the Oki Islands Branch Office of Shimane Prefecture of Japan. The island does not appear ever before to have been claimed by Korea."

==== South Korea announces state intention to resume administration ====
On January 18, 1952, South Korea, a non-signatory state to the San Francisco Peace Treaty, announced the Presidential Declaration of Sovereignty over Adjacent Seas (Peace Line, Rhee Line) including Liancourt Rocks within Korean territory along the expiring MacArthur Line (SCAPIN#1033; June 22, 1946 – April 1952) before the Peace Treaty came into force on April 28.

On July 18, 1952, South Korea issued a presidential order to seize all illegal foreign vessels engaging in fishing in breach of the Peace Line.

==== Japanese MOFA acknowledges intention behind bombing range designation ====
On May 23, 1952, in a Foreign Affairs committee meeting held in the House of Representatives, Ishihara, Vice-minister of Foreigner Affairs acknowledged MOFA's intention regarding the designation of Liancourt Rocks as bombing range for Occupation Forces in response to a question raised by Yamamoto, a Diet member from the Shimane constituency: "[To] help Japan get confirmation of its territorial sovereignty over the island."

==== Second US bombing incident over Liancourt Rocks raises doubts ====
On September 15, 1952, a South Korean scientific expedition aboard Chinnam-ho and a fishing crew of 23 aboard Kwangyong-ho were attacked on Liancourt Rocks waters by a mono-propellered aircraft bearing the US insignia that disappeared in the direction of Japan after dropping four bombs. The Republic of Korea Navy had initially submitted an itinerary to the United Nations Naval Commander in Busan (CTG 95.7) on September 7 of the expedition to visit Ulleungdo Island and Liancourt Rocks September 14 and 15. Granted approval to travel to said areas by CTG 95.7, the expedition departed Busan on September 12 unaware of the United States-Japan Joint Committee's bombing plan over Liancourt Rocks for September 15.

In response to the bombing incident, the US Embassy to Japan in Tokyo transmitted a message including the following on October 3, 1952, to the US State Department:

The history of these rocks has been reviewed more than once by the Department, and does not need extensive recounting here. The rocks, which are fertile seal breeding grounds, were at one time part of the Kingdom of Korea. They were, of course, annexed together with the remaining territory of Korea when Japan extended its Empire over the former Korean State ... There exists a fair chance that ... American bombs may cause loss of life ... which will bring the Korean efforts to recapture these islands into more prominent play, and may involve the United States unhappily in the implications of that effort.

US State Department answered to US Embassy Korea and Tokyo on Nov 14, 1952:

It appears that the Department has taken the position that these rocks belong to Japan and has so informed the Korean Ambassador in Washington. ... it did not appear that they had ever before been claimed by Korea. As a result Article 2(a) of the Treaty of Peace with Japan makes no mention of the Liancourt Rocks.

Finally, US government kept the understanding of Rusk notes, and US Embassy Korea sent a diplomatic document to Korea government on Dec 4, 1952:

The Embassy has taken note of the statement contained in the Ministry's Note that 'Dokdo Island (Liancourt Rocks) ... is a part of the territory of the Republic of Korea.' The United States Government's understanding of the territorial status of this island was stated in assistant Secretary dated August 10, 1951.

==== US documents regarding Liancourt Rocks, 1953–1960 ====
On December 9, 1953, the US Secretary of State John Foster Dulles cabled the American Embassy in Tokyo:

US view re Takeshima is simply that of one of many signatories to the treaty. The U.S. is not obligated to 'protect Japan' from Korean "pretensions" to Dokdo, and that such an idea cannot ... be considered as a legitimate claim for US action under the U.S.-Japan security treaty.

In 1954, James Van Fleet, a US special mission ambassador, submitted a secret report to U.S. President Dwight D. Eisenhower after a round of visits to South Korea, Japan, Taiwan, and the Philippines. The Report of Van Fleet mission to the Far East summarised:

[T]he United States concluded that they remained under Japanese sovereignty and the Island was not included among the Islands that Japan released from its ownership under the Peace Treaty ... Though the United States considers that the islands are Japanese territory, we have declined to interfere in the dispute.

On April 27, 1960, immediately after the resignation of Syngman Rhee, U.S. Ambassador to Japan Douglas MacArthur II sent a telegram to J. Graham Parsons, Assistant Secretary of State for East Asian and Pacific Affairs. In it, he said:

Rhee regime also seized by force and is holding illegally Takeshima Island which has always been considered as Japanese territory. This is very serious and permanent irritant in Japan-ROK relations and there can be no over-all ROK-Japan settlement until this Japanese island is returned to Japan. Therefore we should also press new ROK regime to return Takeshima to Japan.

Further he said:

While we should press strongly for return of Takeshima to Japan, if by any chance new regime were unwilling to do so we should, as very minimum, insist that they agree to submit matter to International Court of Justice for arbitration.

==== Proposal to settle before ICJ rejected ====
In September 1954 and March 1962, Japan proposed to South Korea that the dispute be referred to the International Court of Justice, but South Korea rejected the proposals. Japan again proposed bringing the dispute to the International Court of Justice in August 2012, which was also officially rejected by South Korea on August 30, 2012.

==== Sebald predicts negative outcome in Japan's bid for UNSC action, but advises legal counsel ====
On November 17, 1954, Japanese Embassy Minister Shigenobu Shima asked William Sebald, the Deputy Assistant Secretary of Far Eastern Affairs, and R. B. Finn, Officer in Charge of Japanese Affairs at the State Department, Washington D.C., whether the U.S. would support Japan in the Security Council if it submitted the dispute with the ROK over Liancourt Rocks.

William Sebald responded, "I have personally followed this controversy over a long period of time ... although Japan is free to do as it thought best in presenting its case, the Security Council would probably want to see that all bilateral efforts have been exhausted before hearing the case." He added, "It seems that the ROK will not submit to ICJ arbitration regardless of Security Council action." Sebald added, "It is important for Japan to keep its claim alive and not to permit its rights to be prejudiced by default ... A note to the ROK or other periodic formal statements would serve this purpose."

When Embassy Minister Shigenobu Shima asked whether this constituted US recognition of the validity of Japan's claim, Sebald responded, "US relations with the ROK had recently improved," noting, "The US-ROK Mutual Defense Treaty is being brought into force on November 17 ... The general understanding had been agreed to in Seoul."

As of 2011, the United States Department of State would stand on a neutral position on this issue.

==== South Korea's crackdown on Japanese fishermen and fishing vessels ====
According to a report by the Japan Coast Guard, from 1947 to the end of 1965, South Korea's crackdown on Japanese fishing vessels resulted in the capture of 327 vessels and 3,911 fishermen. Since then, 142 vessels and 3,903 fishermen were returned, but 182 vessels were not returned and eight fishermen were confirmed dead.

=== 1965 Treaty on Basic Relations ===
In 1965, the Treaty on Basic Relations between Japan and the Republic of Korea was signed which recognized the Liancourt Rocks dispute. The conditions in the treaty pertaining to the Liancourt Rocks were as follows:

1. Both countries will recognize that the other claims the islets as their own territory, and neither side would object when the other made a counterargument. They agreed to regard it as a problem that would have to be resolved in the future.
2. If any fishing territories are demarcated in the future, both countries can use the Liancourt Rocks as their own territory to mark the boundaries. Those places where the two lines overlapped would be considered joint territory.
3. The status quo in which South Korea occupies the islets will be maintained, but the Koreans would not increase their police presence or build new facilities.
4. Both countries will uphold this agreement.

The Joongang Ilbo reported in 2007 that this portion of the treaty was ordered destroyed by Chun Doo-hwan in the 1980s.

== After 2000 ==
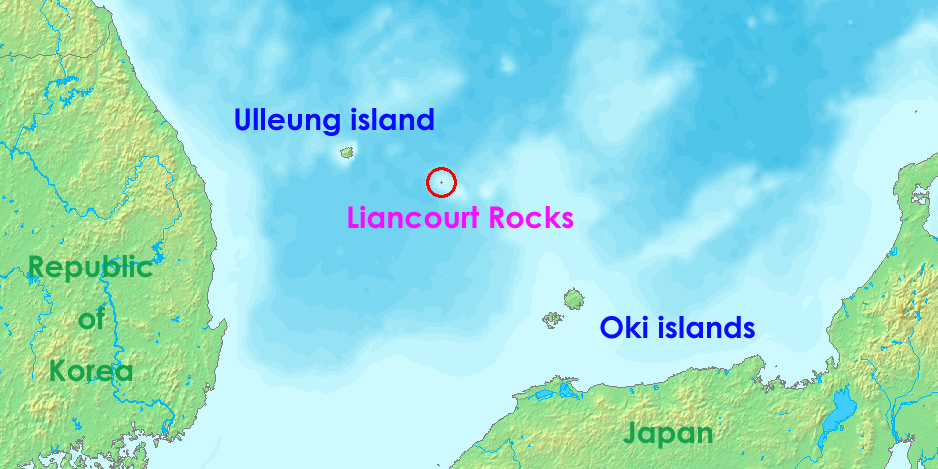
Location of Liancourt Rocks between South Korea and Japan

On April 25, 2006, President Roh Moo-hyun of South Korea announced a special dialog on Korea–Japan relations, demanding Japanese government action following the apology of Japan about previous colonization of Korea. In the dialog, he said 'Dokdo is Korean territory, not an ordinary Korean territory, but Korean territory which had been carved with bitter grief. Dokdo is the first Korean territory which was deprived of when Japan colonized Korea. Japan occupied the land for the battles during Russo-Japanese war'. And he expressed that Japanese claim for Dokdo means a pursuit of the right for the occupied land by imperial invasion, hence the claim for a previous colony. He stated that Dokdo was a symbol of the recovery of Korean sovereignty. This address related to a Japanese plan, announced the day before, for a maritime survey around the Liancourt Rocks. Japan argued that as it would be undertaking the survey in its own claimed exclusive economic zone, there was no need to obtain South Korea's consent and that announcing its intentions was a simple courtesy. South Korea said it would arrest Japanese Coast Guard survey boats if they began to survey in South Korea's claimed zone. To back up its threat, it dispatched 20 gunboats to the area to conduct high seas seizure drills. In these circumstances, U.S. ambassador in Tokyo, Tom Schieffer stated "The Ambassador stated the United States understands that Japan is within its rights under international law. The Koreans are behaving irrationally, and the United States is concerned that they may do something crazy, causing a major problem. Everyone needs to back off, he stressed, to enable the matter to be resolved peacefully." In July 2006, the South Korean government sent a research ship to collect data on currents around the Liancourt Rocks and stated "research is just an act based on sovereignty". On July 5, the research vessel, followed by a South Korean escort ship, entered the area.

On July 14, 2008, South Korea temporarily recalled its ambassador to Japan, after the Japanese government decided to mention the dispute over the islands in the "Commentary to the Curriculum Guideline" (学習指導要領解説, Gakushū shidō yōryō kaisetsu) for social study classes in junior high school. The Korean Coast Guard strengthened its early warning system as a preventative measure against any possible attempt by Japanese right-wing groups to land on the islets. On July 18, 2008, there was a protest in front of the Japanese embassy in Seoul. The South Korean government considered sending marines to replace a police contingent on Dokdo to thwart Japan's territorial claim to the islets.

Prime Minister Han Seung-soo expressed strong dissatisfaction for Japan's Education Ministry. The South Korean government is also considering building infrastructure to provide tap water, establishing an oceanic scientific base, dispatching public officials to the area, allowing free public access to the islets, and turning Dokdo into a resort area with hotels. South Korea rejected a Japanese offer for a bilateral meeting on the sidelines of the annual ASEAN regional security summit in Singapore. North Korea also rejected Japan's sovereignty over the islands and expressed support for South Korean control of the islands. Japan's Chief Cabinet Secretary expressed concern that military tensions would escalate.

In July 2008, the U.S. Board on Geographic Names (BGN) changed the name of the country to which Liancourt Rocks belong from South Korea to Undesignated Sovereignty and also changed the name from "Dokdo" to "Liancourt Rocks". Responding to this change, Gonzalo R. Gallegos, Acting Deputy Spokesman of the U.S. State Department, said on July 28, 2008 that the United States has long maintained a policy stance of neutrality on the islets, and that the latest change does not represent any policy change within the U.S. government. The classification of the Liancourt Rocks as Undesignated Sovereignty in the BGN database was reversed on July 30 under the order of U.S. President George W. Bush, once again marking the status of Liancourt Rocks under South Korean control.

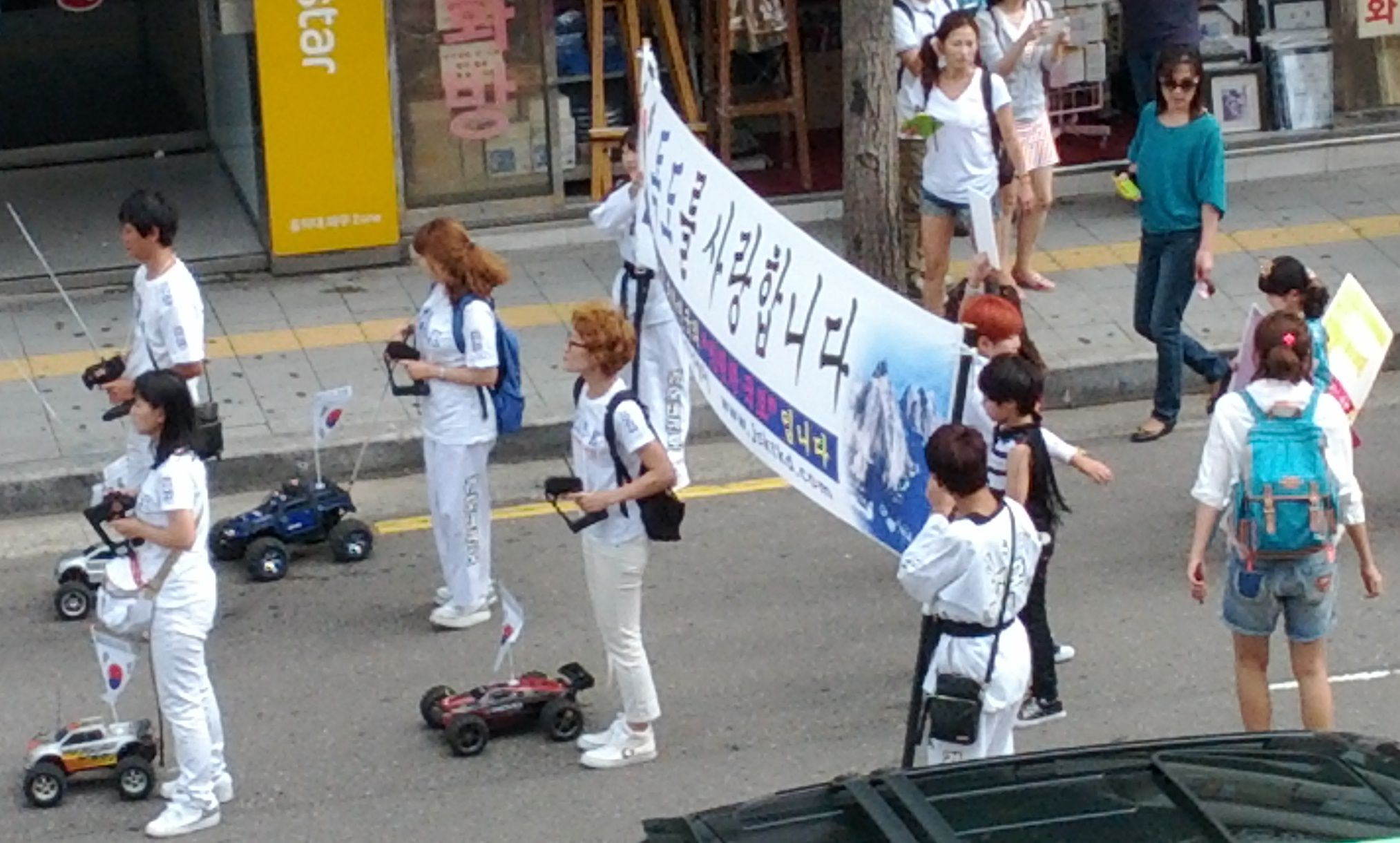
Demonstration in Seoul asserting Korean claim to Dokdo

On August 10, 2012, the South Korean President Lee Myung-Bak visited the Liancourt Rocks, which made him the first South Korean president to do so. Japan temporarily withdrew its ambassador to South Korea, Masatoshi Muto, and Minister for Foreign Affairs Kōichirō Gemba summoned the South Korean ambassador to file a complaint and threatened to lodge a case with the International Court of Justice (ICJ), which was rejected by South Korea. It could do so because both countries party to a dispute must agree to such ICJ cases. It was the first time for Japan to make such a move in 47 years, since Japan and South Korea officially re-established relations in 1965. On August 21, 2012 Japan officially proposed to South Korea that the two countries refer the dispute to the ICJ, which was officially rejected by South Korea on August 30, 2012.

== North Korea ==
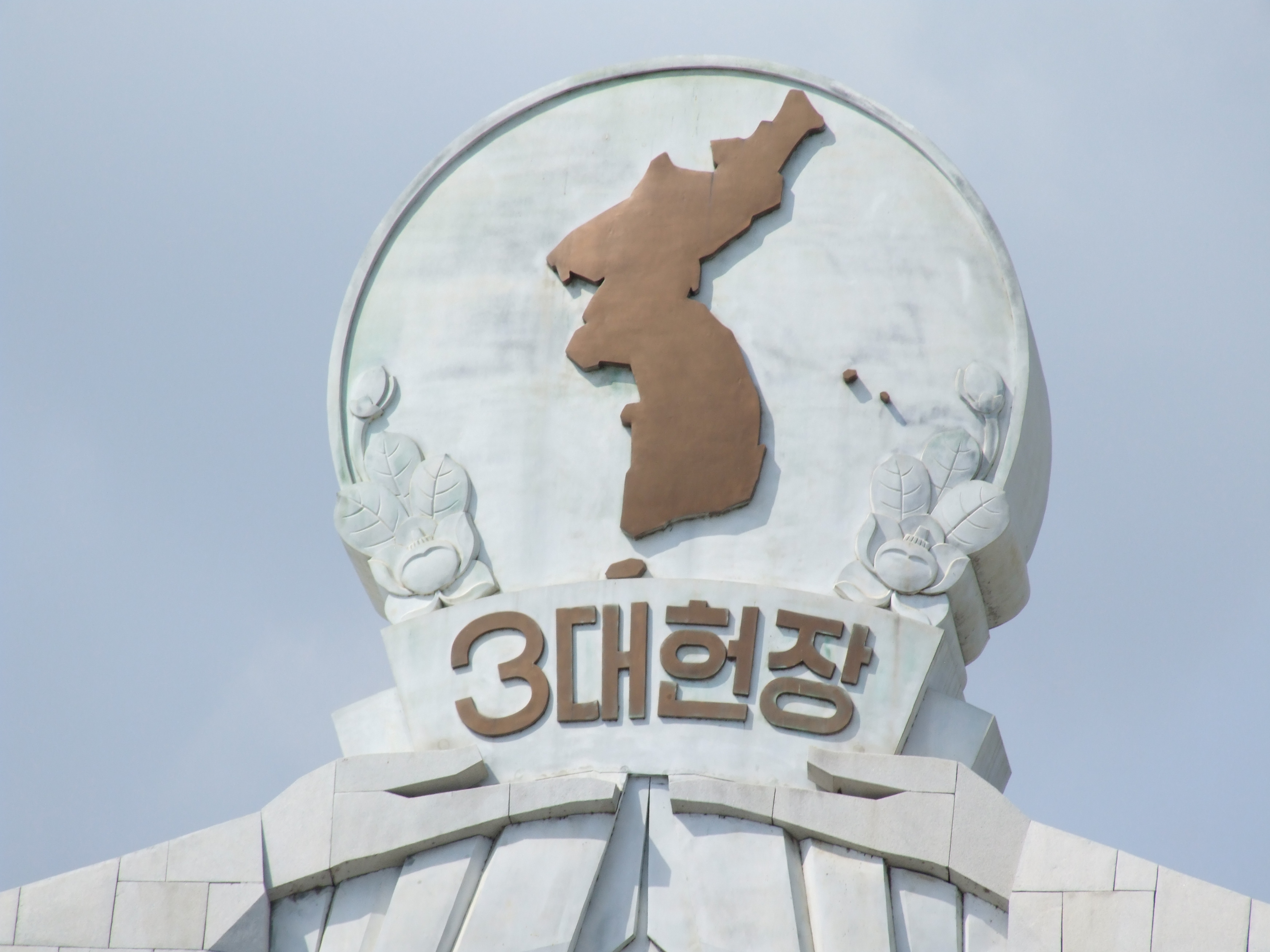
The Arch of Reunification in Pyongyang (demolished 2024) depicted the Korean peninsula, Jeju Island in the south and the Liancourt Rocks (Ulleungdo and Dokdo) in the east.

North Korea's legal standpoint on the dispute is largely identical with that of the South Korean government. On October 13, 1998, the Korean Central News Agency summarized the state's views as follows: "The islet is part of the Korean territory in view of the principles of discovery, possession, and use, which are internationally recognized irrefutable evidence of legal possession of no-man's island and in view of a legislative step of a state to possess it." The historical sources cited by North Korean authors were usually the same as the ones which South Korean scholars relied on, and KCNA repeatedly mentioned the discoveries made by ROK researchers.

Laying the main stress on historical arguments, the North Korean authorities were less keen on emphasizing the principle of effective possession (a keystone of the South Korean standpoint), for this would have recognized the Republic of Korea as a legitimate state entity. Since both the ROK and the DPRK have been prone to consider themselves as the sole legitimate government on the Korean Peninsula, the North Korean authorities, though they never consented to Japan's territorial claims, often found it inconvenient to side with Seoul against Tokyo in the dispute. In those periods when North Korea was on better terms with Japan than with the ROK (like 1955–1964, 1970–1977, and 1997–1998), North Korean propaganda essentially ignored the problem of the Liancourt Rocks. However, if Pyongyang felt threatened by Japanese-South Korean rapprochement (as in 1965–1968) or sought to cooperate with Seoul against Tokyo (as in 2000–2001), the North Korean media promptly raised the issue, with the aim of causing friction in Japanese-ROK relations.

In August 2018, following the Japanese decision of describing the Liancourt Rocks as "pertaining to Japan" and "illegally occupied" by Korea in high school textbooks effective 2019, KCNA published a news piece condemning the Japanese claim to the islands, once again using historical arguments to back the Korean standpoint.

== China ==
A departure from the Chinese government's previous stance of avoiding direct comments on the dispute, in 2025 China offered indirect support to South Korea by condemning Japan's territorial claims as "malicious" and Chinese state media has labelled the islets as Dokdo, effectively recognizing the Korean position.

== See also ==
- Japan–Korea disputes
- Rusk documents
- Territorial disputes of Japan
- History of Japan–Korea relations
- Dokdo is Our Land
- Japan-North Korea relations
- Japan–South Korea Joint Declaration of 1998
- Lee Kyu-Won (Korean royal prosecutor)
- The Blood Stained Route Map
