= Boussole =

Boussole (French: "compass") may refer to:

- French ship Boussole, several ships
- Boussole Rock, Jukdo (island)
- Boussole Strait, in the Kuril Islands
- Boussole, a novel by Mathias Énard
- La Boussole, 1990s French hip hop group including Médine
