= An Yong-bok =

Korean fisherman related to a Korea–Japan dispute

- Occupation: Fisherman
- Years active: 1692–1697
- Known for: Travels to Japan

- An Yong-bok
- Hangul: 안용복
- Hanja: 安龍福
- RR: An Yongbok
- MR: An Yongbok

An Yong-bok (fl. 1692–1697) was a Korean fisherman in 17th century of Joseon Dynasty famous for his travels to Japan. His activities were instrumental in determining fishery rights in the waters of Ulleungdo and the Liancourt Rocks, two islands in the East Sea.

== Background ==
=== Joseon, Korea ===
In the beginning of Joseon dynasty, a major policy to manage the two islands in East Sea, Ulleungdo and Dokdo (독도), was to repatriate the local residents back to the main land. The repatriation policy (쇄환 정책), in context of Joseon, was a policy to resettle islanders to main land for the sake of islander's safety and national security. It had been implemented since the end of Goryeo dynasty when the islanders were frequently exposed to Japanese piracy.

Since then, the repatriation policy continued to take effect during Joseon dynasty so as to effectively protect the islanders. Especially during the reign of King Taejong and King Sejong the Great, Ulleungdo and Dokdo islanders were removed from the islands multiple times. The islanders were repatriated twice under King Taejong's reign (1403 and 1416) and three times during King Sejong the Great's (1419, 1425 and 1438). It was the period when the islanders suffered again from the Japanese piracy (왜구, Wokou) and thus, no one lived in Ulleungdo and Dokdo from then on.

Regardless of the repatriation policy, however, a lot of people visited Ulleungdo and Dokdo for fishing and gathering namul (나물, edible grass or leaves) during King Sukjong's reign. Particularly, the country reached its peak of natural disaster during the period of King Sukjong, and thus famine and epidemic diseases were prevalent throughout Korean peninsula. In order to overcome such hardships from outbreak of famine and epidemics, people came to Ulleungdo and Dokdo, islands in East Sea that are rich in fishery resources, namul, and wild ginseng (산삼).

According to An Yong-bok's statement in 1693, An Yong-bok visited Ulleungdo thanks to a group of fishermen who had already been to Ulleungdo for fishing. In particular, fishermen that lived on the shores of East Sea often visited Ulleungdo that is rich in abalone (전복) and seaweed (미역), as they were highly dependent on fishery for living rather than farming. Also, according to Yi Kyu-won's 'The Diary of Inspection on Ulleungdo' (울릉도 감찰일기), he figured out that people often came to Ulleungdo for gathering namul and especially wild ginseng.

In other words, in practice, people frequently visited the two islands in East Sea for fishing and gathering namul.

=== Japan ===
Japanese fishermen from Yonago of Tottori Domain began fishing in Ulleungdo with approval from Tokugawa Shogunate and continued to secure its exclusive fishery rights. Although the license from the Shogunate was temporary, Japanese fishermen continued to use the short-term license and to fish in islands in East Sea. In 1692, Japanese fishermen began to encounter groups of Korean fishermen while fishing, which led them to think that Koreans violated the exclusive fishery rights.

== Capture and activities in Japan ==
The An Yong-bok incident occurred in the spring of 1693 when Korean fishermen from Busan and Ulsan clashed with other fisherman from Otani and Murakawa at Dokdo.

An Yong-bok and Pak Eo-dun (박어둔) were captured and taken to the Yonago in the Tottori Domain (modern-day Yonago city and Tottori Prefecture).

The pair was detained at a house in Yonago for two months, while this case was investigated by the Tottori Domain. The shogunate ordered his subjects to send them to the magistrate at Nagasaki, an area controlled by the Tsushima Domain. An Yong-bok was held hostage by the lord of Tsushima Domain(Sō Yoshitsugu) again. When An Yong-bok was repatriated to Korea, the Tokugawa Shogunate demanded the prohibition of Koreans going to Ulleung-do. This led to diplomatic friction between Japan and Korea.

After An Yong-bok was repatriated to Korea, he testified that "the Kanpaku (Imperial regent) of the Tokugawa Shogunate made a note that confirmed Ulleungdo as Korean territory and he was in possession of the note until he was seized en route to Korea by the lord of Nagasaki, upon which the note was confiscated and he was held on the grounds of trespassing onto Japanese territory."

Korean scholars consider this testimony a fact. Japanese scholars, however, insist that this testimony is primarily Ahn's claim without supporting evidence because he did not go to Edo, the capitol of the Shogunate, and the Shogunate demanded Koreans be prohibited from going to Ulleung-do.

As a result of diplomatic negotiation; in January 1696 a senior statesmen of the shogunate issued the following instructions to the lord of Tsushima Domain(translated into English):

1. Ulleungdo is about 160-ri (640 km) from Oki, but only about 40-ri (160 km) from Korea; therefore, it can be considered that Ulleungdo is the same as Takeshima and is an island belonging to Korea.
2. Japanese are forbidden henceforth to make passage to Takeshima for the Japan-Korea friendship because the island is useless.
3. The lord of Tsushima should communicate this to Korea.

Though the Tottori Domain reported to the shogunate that "Takeshima does not belong to Inaba Province nor Hōki Province. There are no other islands belonging to the two states including Takeshima (Ulleungdo) and Matsushima (Liancourt Rocks)," the shogunate did not order a prohibition of Japanese going to Matsushima (Liancourt Rocks). In the diplomatic negotiation between Japan (Tsushima Domain) and the Chosun government, they never discussed the Liancourt Rocks.

In 1696, Ahn visited Japan again. According to a Japanese record found in May 2005, the Bafuku is the investigation on An Yong-bok who arrived in Hokishu in May 1696 via the Oki Islands. The document has a total of 15 pages. The fifth page records An Yong-bok's statement that Jasando (Usando) is Matsushima (松島) The last page records the eight provinces of Korea. The document specifically states that Takeshima (竹島 Ulleungdo) and Matsushima (松島 Liancourt Rocks) are part of the Gangwon Province.

The principal retainer of the Shogunate directed the Tottori Domain to send him away because only the Tsushima Domain has the right to determine matters of diplomacy with Joseon. According to the Sukjong Sillok, Ahn testified as follows after he was banished by the Tottori Domain and returned to Joseon.

I sailed to Ulleung-do and the Usando again with the company of sixteen fishermen, disguised as a naval officer, and clashed again with the Japanese at Ulleung-do. The Japanese said they were living on Matsushima and strayed onto Ullungdo while fishing and would return. I fulminated at this, demanding to know why the Japanese were living on a Korean island. Upon arriving in Japan, I stated to the lord of the Tottori Domain that "though it was confiscated by the Tsushima Domain, I had held the Tokugawa Shogunate's edict that both islands were Korean possessions before visit. When I declared my intention to appeal to the Kanpaku, for the Shogunates edict to be upheld, the lord of Tsushima Domain came to Tottori and entreated me to stop.

— Ahn
