= Usando =

Historical name for an island in the Sea of Japan

Usan-do (Korean: 우산도, 于山島) is a historical name for an island in the Sea of Japan described in Korean records. It was part of the ancient state of Usan-guk, but its exact identity is disputed. It may refer to:

- Jukdo, a Korean island 4 km east of Ulleungdo.
- The Liancourt Rocks, a disputed group of islets now known as Dokdo in Korea and Takeshima in Japan.

== Old Korean maps of Usan-do ==
Usan-do

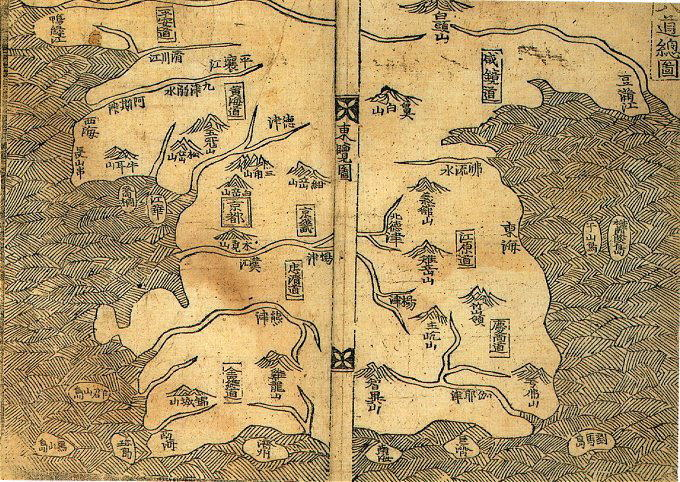
Joseon map (1530)

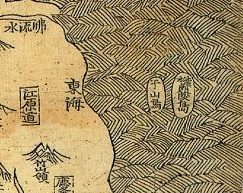
Joseon map (1530): Ulleungdo (鬱陵島) and Usando (于山島)

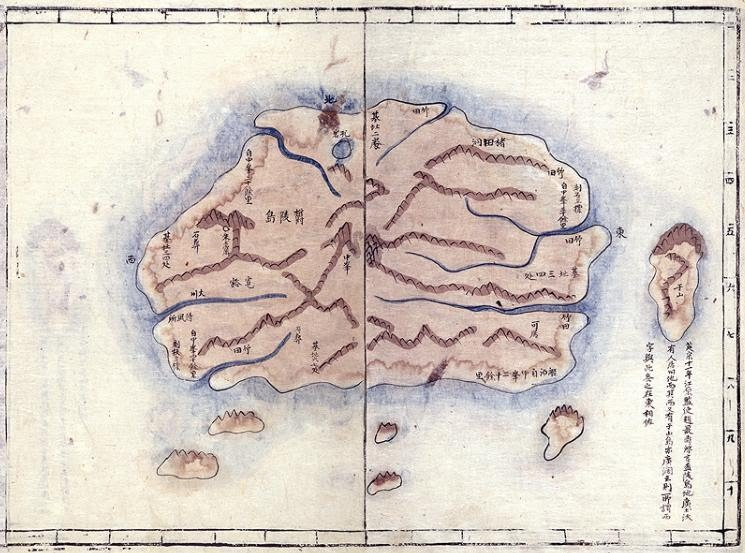
Kim Jeong-ho "Daedongyeojido" (1861): Ulleungdo (鬱陵島) and Usando (于山)

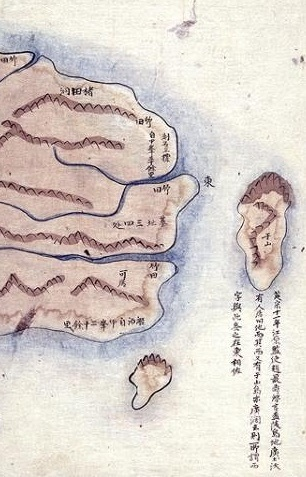
Kim Jeong-ho "Daedongyeojido" (1861): East of Ulleungdo (鬱陵島) and Usando (于山)

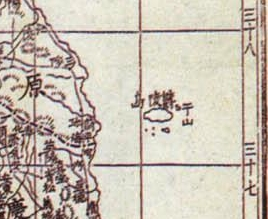
A map by the Korean Empire (1899): Ulleungdo (鬱陵島) and Usan (于山) as Jukdo

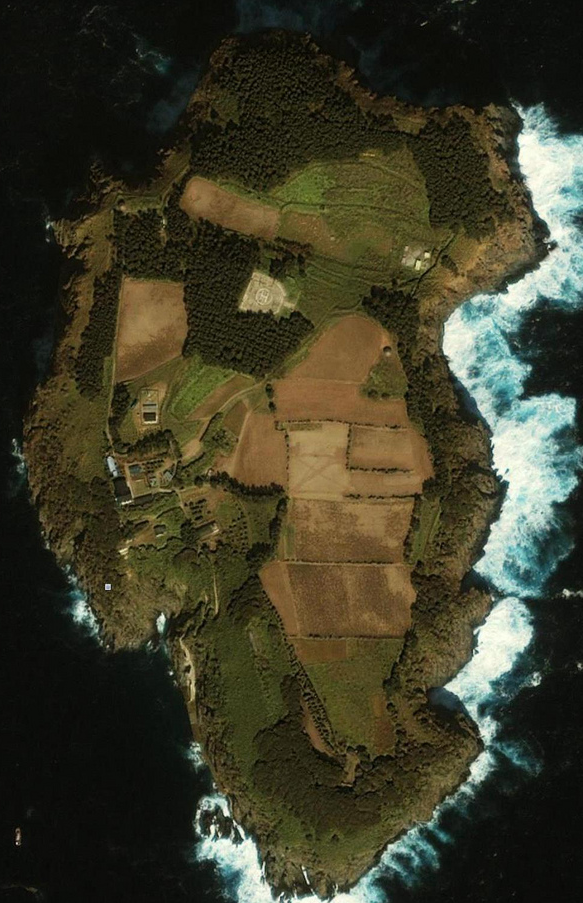
Aerial photograph of Jukdo Island (for reference)

== See also ==
- Lee Kyu-Won
