= Dokdo Volunteer Garrison =

South Korean outpost on Liancourt Rocks

The Dokdo Volunteer Garrison (Korean: 독도의용수비대) was a South Korean paramilitary outpost on the Liancourt Rocks. Both South Korea and Japan each claim sovereignty over the islands. The garrison was established by volunteers from Ulleungdo Island and the Korean Veterans Association, and was led by Hong Sun-chil. The garrison was a private organization that is considered to have laid the foundation for South Korea to exercise practical territorial sovereignty over the islands. According to multiple sources, including the Encyclopedia of Korean Culture, the garrison engaged in several clashes against the Japan Coast Guard, and was maintained from 1953 to 1956 until South Korean police forces fully took over operations over the island.

== History ==
=== Background and Creation ===
After the allied occupation of Japan post-World War II, Japan regained its sovereignty through the San Francisco Peace Treaty. However, despite President Syngman Rhee's requests, South Korea was not invited as a party to the agreement. Consequently, the issue over the rocks was left unresolved, with the treaty carrying no specific references to the islets. From April 1953, various summits took place between South Korea and Japan, with ownership over the Liancourt Rocks becoming a hotly contested issue. From May to July 1953, the Japan Coast Guard patrolled the island several times, installing warning signs that asserted the island as Japanese territory. On October 23, the Japan Coast Guard installed a new territorial landmark on the islands, replacing the South Korean ones. In addition, Japanese ships, fishing boats, and training ships frequently appeared near the islands. Ulleungo residents perceived these actions as threatening their livelihoods, which depended on fishing.

On April 20, 1953, work began to create a garrison on the islands, with Korean War veteran and Ulleungdo native Hong Sun-chil as the leader. Hong and several other veterans, who had previously served in the South Korean armed forces volunteer service and had returned to Ulleung Island after the war, created the garrison.

=== Activity ===
During its occupation of the island, the Dokdo Volunteer Garrison carried out security operations. In August 1954, a clash broke out between the garrison and a Japanese patrol vessel, which was forced to retreat. In November, a battle between the garrison and three Japanese patrol vessels and an aircraft resulted in several casualties. The Dokdo Volunteer Garrison was stationed independently on the island until mid-August 1954, when the South Korean government established a military outpost and a lighthouse on the island. The garrison was stationed along with local police forces until December 30, 1956, when the garrison handed over security work and equipment to the police, entirely putting an end to their activities. However, nine Dokdo Volunteer Garrison members were recruited by the Ulleung Island police station as police officers and took charge of guard duty even after the dissolution of the garrison.

== Organization ==
Captain Hong Soon-chil selected his troops, having regard to their combat experience, bravery, age, personality, and family situation.

Dokdo Volunteer Forces
General	Hong Sun-chil
Adjutant (33)	Hwang Young-moon
Combat 1 Captain & troops	Seo Ki-jong (Kim Jae-doo, Choi Jae-woo, Cho Sang-dal, Kim Yong-geun, Han Jin-jin, Kim Hyun-soo, Kim Jang-ho and Yang Bong-joon)
Combat 2 Captain & troops	Jung Won-do (Kim Yeong-bok, Kim Su-bong, Lee Sang-guk, Lee Gyu-hyun, Kim Kyung-ho, Heo Shin-do, Kim Young-ho)
Rear support captain & troops	Byeong-Yeol Kim (Jung Jae-deok, Han Sang-yong, Park Young hee)
Educational captain & troops	Yoo Won Sik (Oh Il Hwan, Ko Sung Dal)
Supply Captain & troops	Kim in-Gab (Jung-Ikwan, Ahn Kwang-Ryul, Jung Hyun Kwon, Koo Yong Bok, Lee Pil-young)

== Support ==
The South Korean state provides support for the members of the Dokdo Volunteer Garrison and survivors who have made special sacrifices to defend Liancourt Rocks.

- Payment: the spouses of the members of the Garrison and the deceased receive a pension from the government
- National cemetery: the Dokdo Volunteer Garrison cemetery in Daejeon National Cemetery
- Payment as compensation for the death of members of the Garrison and their spouses
- A national day commemorating the Garrison
- The month of the Patriotic Veterans, and the Day of Comfort
- Invitation to a consolation event

== Assessment ==
In 1966, the South Korean government evaluated the achievements of the Dokdo Volunteer Garrison. It awarded Hong Sun-chil, the captain, a Work Merit Award. Eleven members were awarded a Defense Certificate. Dr. Yoo Ha-young of the Northeast Asian History Foundation said, "Above all, the presence of the Dokdo Volunteer Garrison has contributed to the exercise of national jurisdiction over Liancourt Rocks and the protection of the nation's territory."

== Controversies ==
In 2006, South Korean news outlet OhmyNews reported that the stories and activities of the Dokdo Volunteer Garrison were exaggerated and distorted. OhmyNews further reported that the garrison was actually created in 1954 and was only operational for less than 8 months until its practical dissolution in December 1954.

In another article, OhmyNews also asserted that there is no evidence, other than Hong's self-written records, that supports the notion that the garrison engaged in a fierce battle with Japanese patrol vessels. The article claimed that, according to witness accounts from Choi Hyun-shik, who was the chief of the Ulleung Police Station from 1953 to 1955, there were only two confrontations between Korean and Japanese forces over the Liancourt Rocks. One was an incident in July 1953, when a Japanese fishing vessel, after landing on the rocks, was forced to leave the island after warning shots were fired by a guard. The second incident happened around September 1954, when a Japanese patrol vessel was forced to abort after warning shots were fired from a mortar by police forces. According to Choi, Hong was not present on the rocks during both incidents and these "battles" were carried out solely by police forces, not the garrison.

== Bibliography ==
- Bukh, Alexander (2020). These islands are ours : the social construction of territorial disputes in Northeast Asia. Stanford University Press. pp. 232 [230]. ISBN 9781503611894..
