= The Blood Stained Route Map =

2004 North Korean historical film

- DVD cover
- Hangul: 피묻은 략패
- RR: Pi mudeun ryakpae
- MR: P'i mudŭn ryakp'ae
- Directed by: Phyo Kwang
- Release date: 2004
- Running time: 139 minutes(total) 68 minutes (part 1) 71 minutes (part2)
- Country: North Korea
- Language: Korean

The Blood Stained Route Map (Korean: 피묻은 략패) is a 2004 North Korean film directed by Phyo Kwang, which was released in 2 parts. Set during the Goryeo period, the film tells the story of a family who fight together to protect the Dokdo islets (Liancourt Rocks) against Japanese invaders. The invaders seek a map showing the location of a golden Buddha. If it falls into their hands, it will mean the end of an independent Korea.

== Distribution ==
The Blood Stained Route Map received its South Korean premiere in 2005, where it was one of three North Korean films shown at the Special Screening section of the 6th Jeonju International Film Festival, held from 28 April–6 May. Hwang Kyun-min, coordinator of the section, regarded the screening as being "timely since the issue of [Dokdo] is very controversial now." It later became the first North Korean film to be screened at the outdoor plaza in front of Seoul City Hall, when it was shown on 1 July 2005 as part of the buildup to the Daejong Film Festival.
