= French ship Boussole =

Boussole has been the name of many ships in the French Navy including:

- French frigate Boussole (1785), launched in 1782 as Portfaix, renamed 1785 and lost 1788
- French corvette Boussole (1833), launched in 1833 and wrecked in 1848
