= Daedongyeojido =

1861 large map of Korea

Daedongyeojido

Daedongyeojido (also Daedong yeojido, Korean: 대동여지도; Hanja: 大東輿地圖; lit. The Map of the Great East) is a large scale map of Korea produced by Joseon dynasty cartographer Kim Jeong-ho in 1861. A second edition was printed in 1864. One source describes it as the "oldest map in Korea". Daedongyeojido is considered very advanced for its time, and marks the zenith of pre-modern Korean cartography.

== Description ==
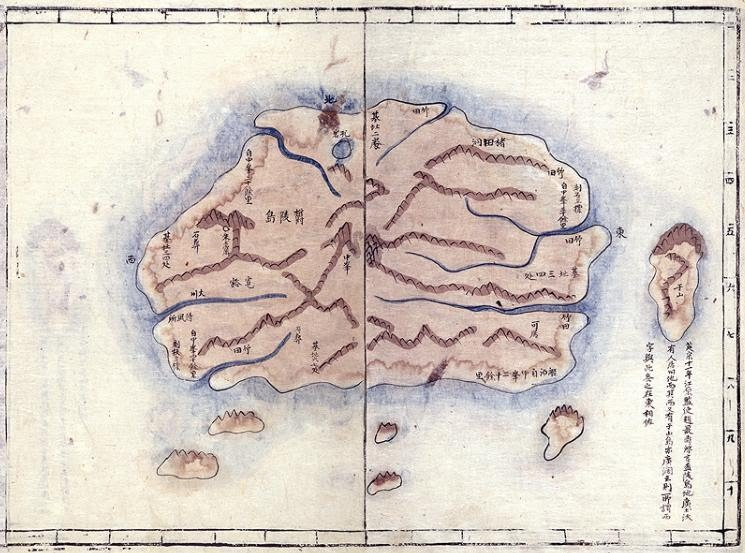
"Daedongyeojido" (1861) Ulleungdo and Usan

The map consists of 22 separate, foldable booklets, each covering approximately 47 kilometres (29 mi) (north-south) by 31.5 kilometres (19.6 mi) (east–west). Combined, they form a map of Korea that is 6.7 metres (22 ft) wide and 3.8 metres (12 ft) long. The scale of the map is 1:162,000. The map was printed from 70 basswood woodblocks, engraved on both sides. The techniques to create the map have been described as a hybrid of Korean and Western methods.

The map is praised for precise delineations of mountain ridges, waterways, and transportation routes. It also has markings for settlements, including villages, as well as notable administrative and cultural areas and sites, such as past and present government offices and military sites, public warehouses, government horse ranches, beacon fire mounds, and royal tombs.

Several versions of the map exist, with some variations (such as the number of booklets, either 21 or 22). The map was accompanied by a preface explaining the methodology, and a legend, as well as additional statistics, and a separate map for the Korean capital of Seoul.

== 100,000-won banknote controversy ==
In 2008 the map was considered as an image for one of the 100,000-won banknotes, which would have been the highest-denomination South Korean banknote to date. However, the map of Daedongyeojido did not portray the internationally disputed Dokdo Islands, and the ensuing public debate in Korea over whether the map on a banknote should be changed to include them made the image too controversial for such a high-visibility placement. Eventually, the 100,000-won banknote was cancelled due to the controversy stirred by the issue.

== See also ==
- Geography of Korea
