= Yi Kyu-won =

- Hangul: 이규원
- Hanja: 李奎遠
- RR: I Gyuwon
- MR: I Kyuwŏn

Courtesy name
- Hangul: 성오
- Hanja: 星五
- RR: Seongo
- MR: Sŏngo

Posthumous name
- Hangul: 장희
- Hanja: 莊僖
- RR: Janghui
- MR: Changhŭi

Lee Kyu-won (Korean: 이규원; Hanja: 李奎遠; 19 March 1833 – 11 November 1901) was a military official in the Joseon Dynasty.

King Gojong appointed Lee Kyu-won as a Royal Prosecutor for Ulleungdo Island in 1881. He drafted the official report to King Gojong.

== Background ==
Lee was born on 19 March 1833. He passed the mandatory Military Service Examination at age 19 and started his career as a Seonjeonkwan in 1858.

== Career ==
=== Governor ===
He was appointed as governor of many local areas including Tongjin (Gimpo) and Jeju Island. He died on 11 November 1901, at 69.

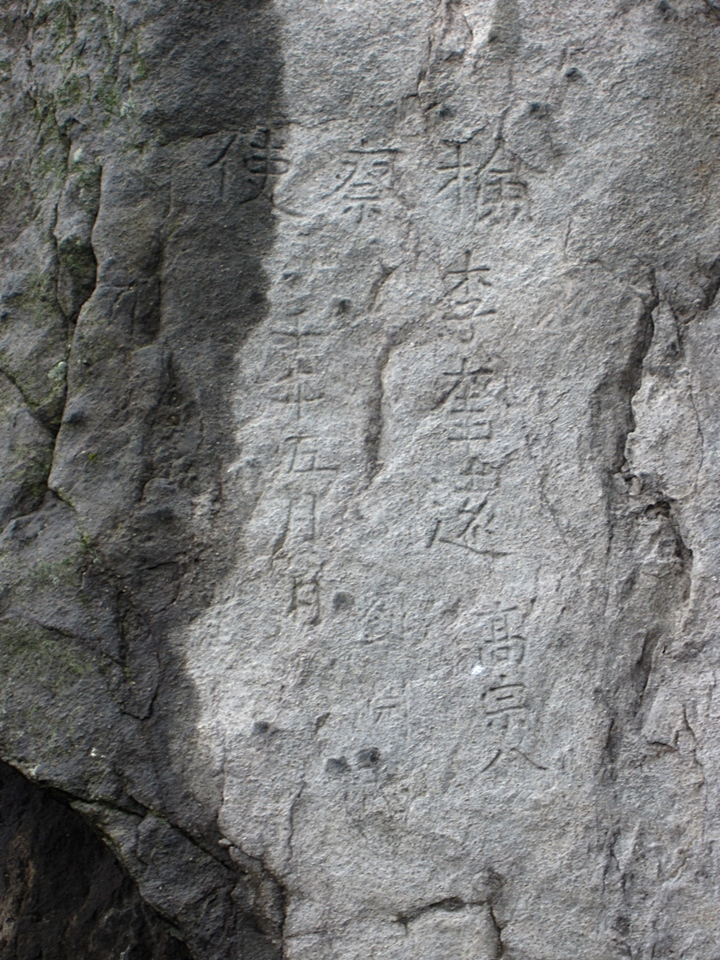
In 1882 Lee Gyu Won's name was engraved on a rock face on Korea's Ulleungdo

=== Royal Prosecutor ===
Lee Kyu-won was appointed as a Royal Prosecutor in 1881 by King Gojong and was sent to Ulleungdo in order to survey the island the following year. At that time, the island had only 106 inhabitants. He spent ten days on Ulleungdo, surveying the land and marking out sea routes back to the Korean Peninsula. According to his diary, he became acquainted with 132 Koreans and 8 Japanese men.

The diary included a record of the topography, geomorphology, climate, animals, plants and products of the island. He recommended Naridong as an appropriate residential area, because the area is flat and large enough for 1,000 households. He suggested 14 possible ports along the sea coast.

Lee told King Gojong that he believed that Usan Island was the ancient name of Ulleungdo. He reported that he and his group climbed the highest mountain in Ulleungdo, the 984 metres (3,228 ft) Songinbon Peak) the only other visible island was Jukdo, 2 kilometers from Ulleungdo.

== See also ==
- Jukdo (island)
- Usan-do
