= Jukdo (island) =

South Korean island in the Sea of Japan

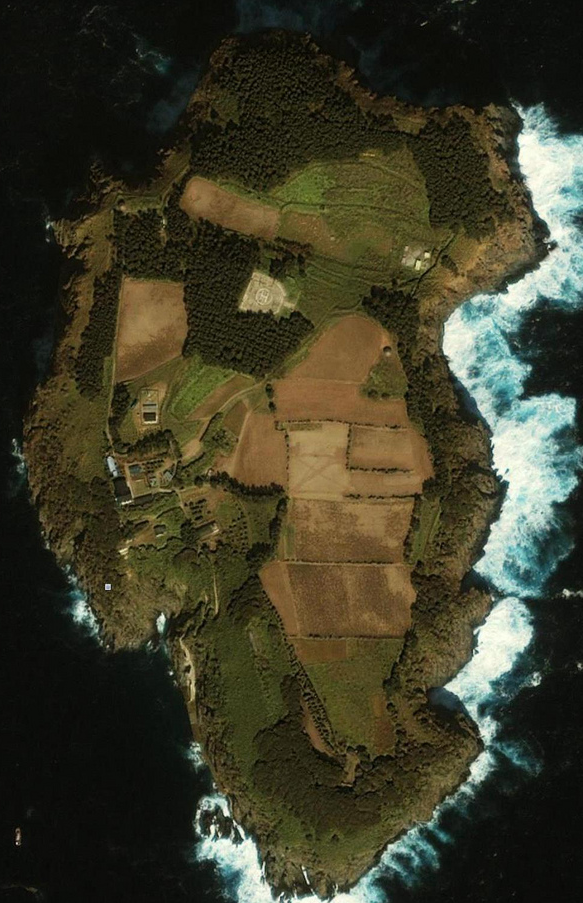
- Satellite image of Jukdo (2020)
- Interactive map of Jukdo

Geography
- Coordinates: 37.529°N 130.938°E

Korean name
- Hangul: 죽도
- Hanja: 竹島
- RR: Jukdo
- MR: Chukto

Jukdo (Korean: 죽도; lit. 'bamboo island') is a small island in Jeodong-ri, Ulleung-myeon, Ulleung County, North Gyeongsang Province, South Korea. It is next to the island Ulleungdo in the Sea of Japan. It is also known as Jukseodo (죽서도; 竹嶼島). It lies 2 km (1 mi) east of Ulleungdo, and is the largest island in the group apart from Ulleungdo itself. In 2004, one family of three members was living on the island.

Jukdo island measures 734 metres (0.456 mi) long and 482 metres (0.300 mi) wide.

== Gallery ==
Ulleungdo/Jukdo

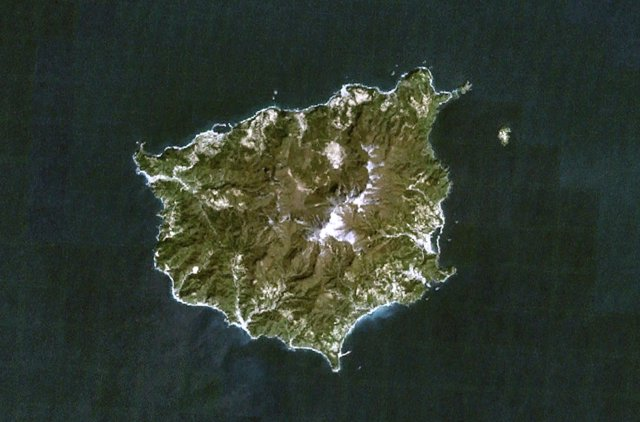
Satellite view of Ulleungdo (North up). The small island to the northeast of Ulleungdo is Jukdo.

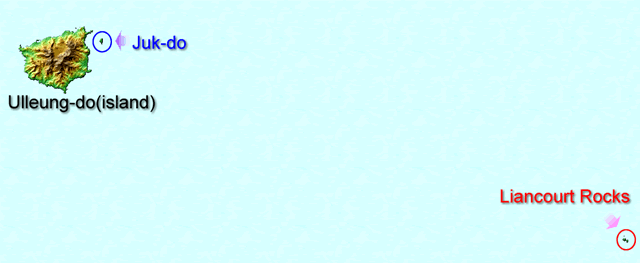
Positions of Uleungdo, Jukdo and Liancourt Rocks

=== Old Korean maps ===
Ulleungdo,

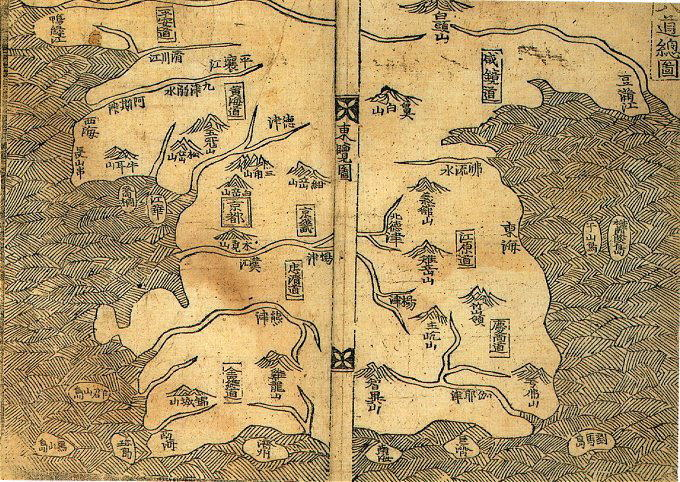
Joseon map (1530)

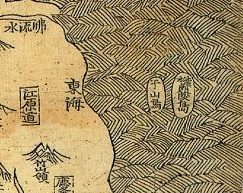
Joseon map (1530), close-up view of Jukdo

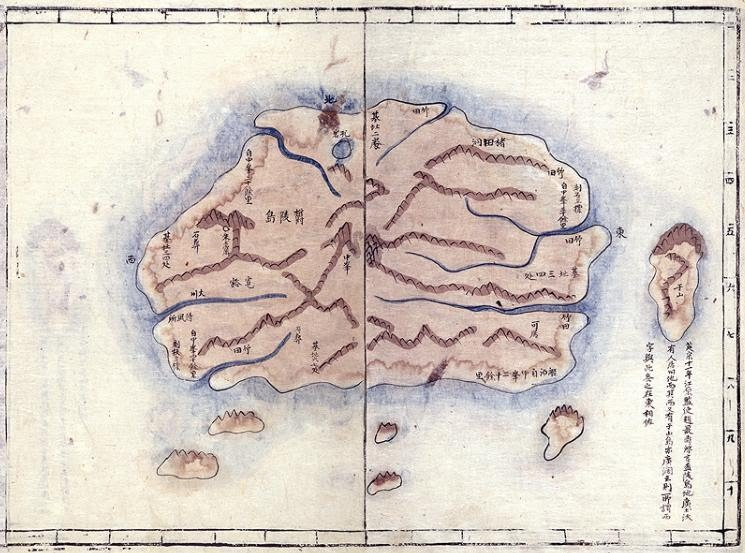
Kim Jeong-ho "Daedongyeojido" (1861)

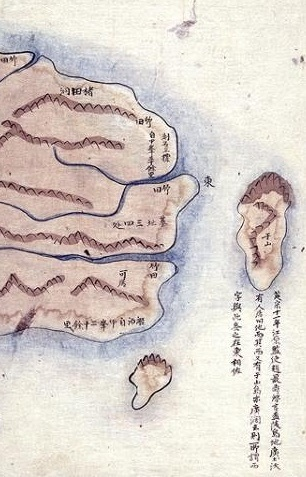
Kim Jeong-ho "Daedongyeojido" (1861)

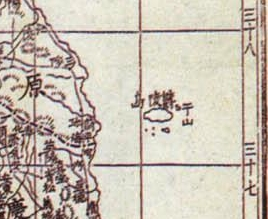
A map by the Korean Empire (1899)

== See also ==
- Ulleungdo
- Usando
- Liancourt Rocks
