= Gim Jeong-ho =

Korean geographer (1804–1866)

- Hangul: 김정호
- Hanja: 金正浩
- RR: Gim Jeongho
- MR: Kim Chŏngho
- IPA: [kimdʑʌŋho]

Art name
- Hangul: 고산자
- Hanja: 古山子
- RR: Gosanja
- MR: Kosanja
- IPA: [koːsʰandʑa]

Courtesy name
- Hangul: 백원, 백온
- Hanja: 伯元, 伯溫
- RR: Baekwon, Baekon
- MR: Paegwŏn, Paegon
- IPA: [pɛɡwʌn], [pɛɡon]

Kim Jeong-ho's magnum opus, Daedong Yeojido.

Kim Jeong-ho (Korean: 김정호; 1804–1866?) was a Korean geographer and cartographer. His art name was Gosanja (고산자; lit. 'person of the old mountain'). He was born in Hwanghaedo. It is believed that he walked the entire length and breadth of the Korean Peninsula, through mountain and valley, in order to research and compile his magnum opus, the Daedongyeojido, (대동여지도; 大東輿地圖) a map of Korea that was published in 1861, from which a single-sheet version, the Daedongyeojijeondo (대동여지전도 大東與地全圖), was subsequently made.

The events surrounding Kim's death are obscure. Following the publication of a later version of the Daedongyeojido in 1866, Kim is not heard from again. The document from the Governor-General of Korea asserts that the Korean regent Daewongun, upon viewing the later version of Kim's great map, became incensed by its inclusion of sensitive details critical to national defense. According to the document, the Daewongun had Kim arrested and jailed, and the maps destroyed.

However, the original wood printing block of Daedongyeojido can still be found in the Soongsil University and also in the Korea University, contradicting the Governor-General’s document. Furthermore, others who helped develop the map, such as Choe Han-gi and Shin Hun, were not convicted at all. The Korean historical community generally believe that the document was a fabrication by the General-Government, which was under the control of Japan during the Japanese colonization of Korea.

The asteroid 95016 Kimjeongho is named in his honour.

== Gallery ==
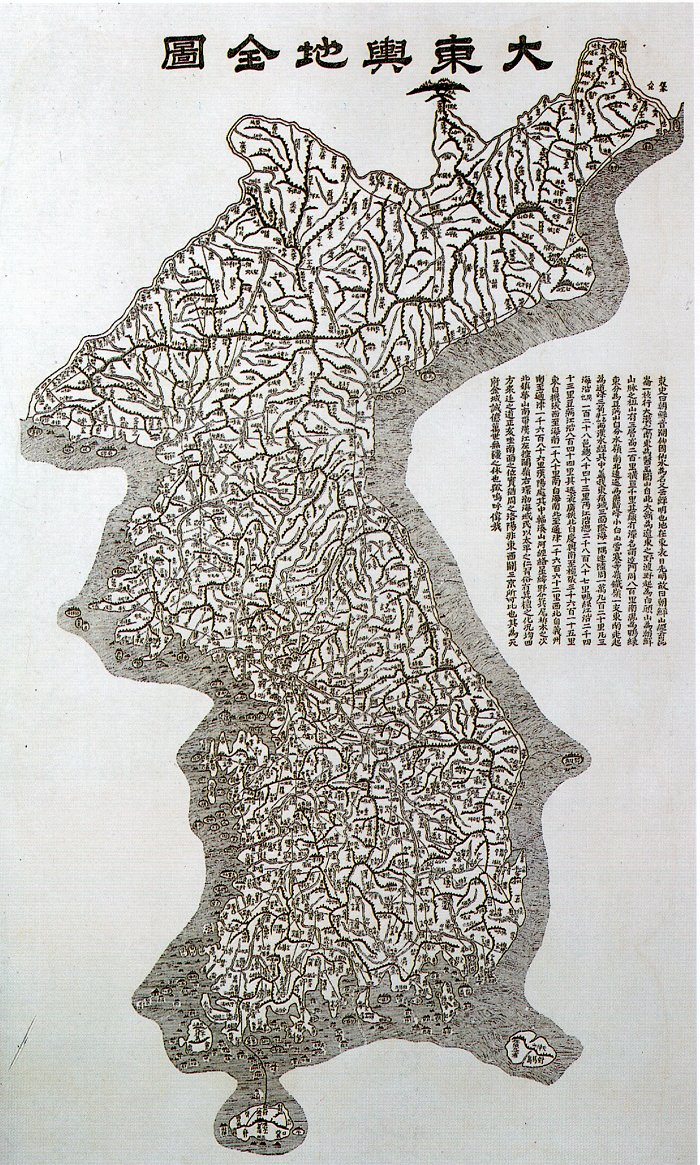
Daedong Yeoji Jeondo

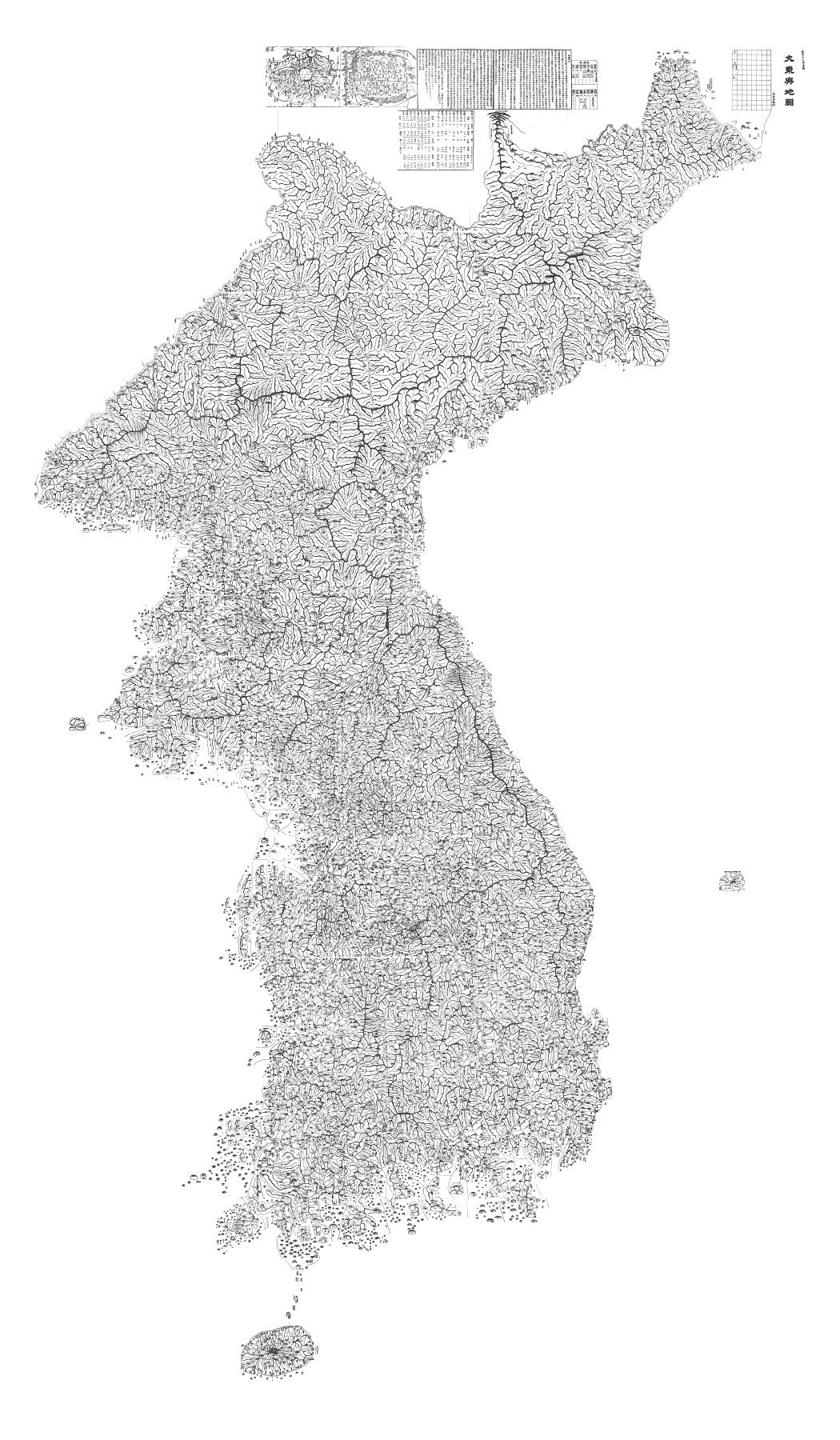
Daedong Yeoji Jeondo, another version

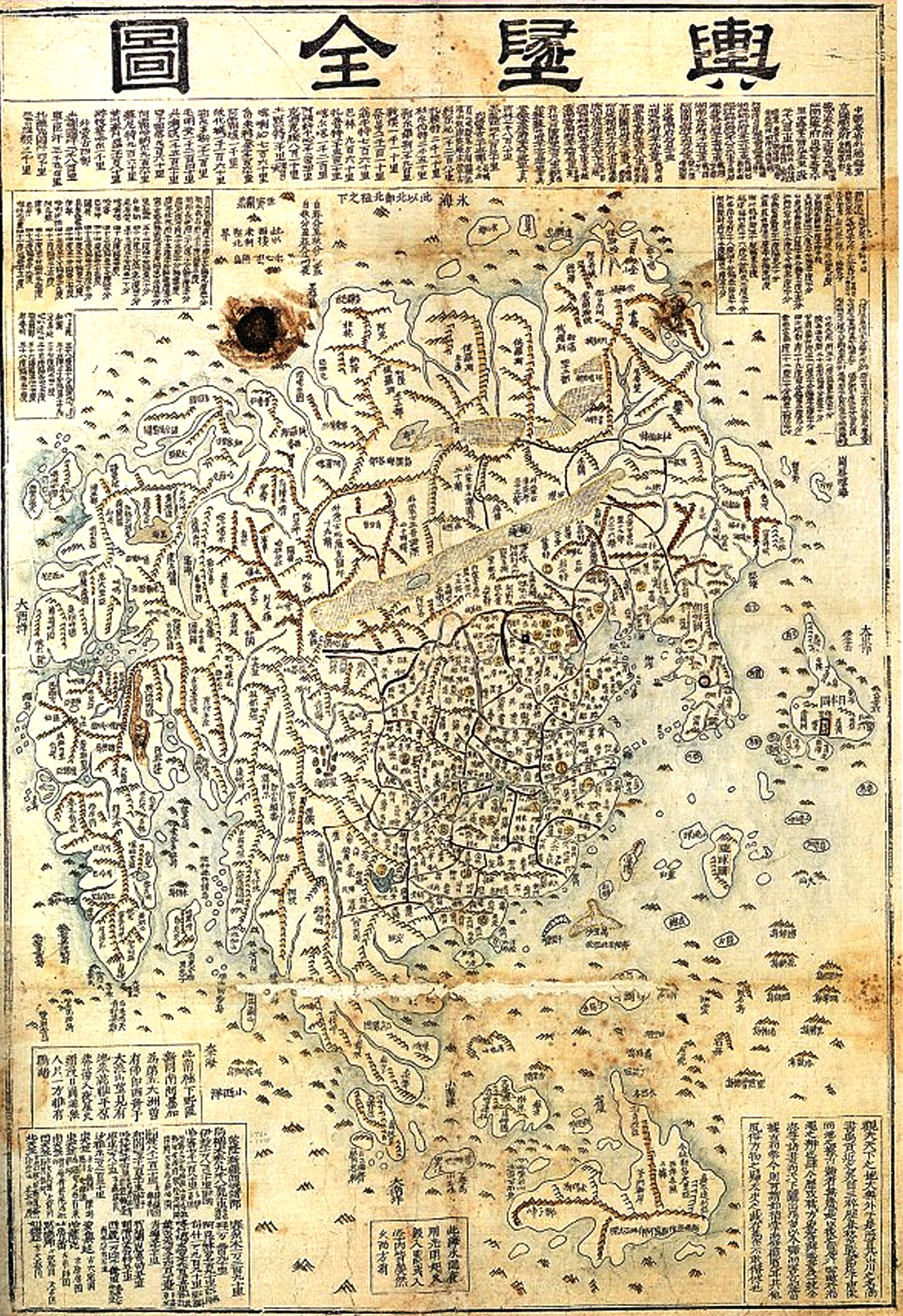
Yeoji Jeondo

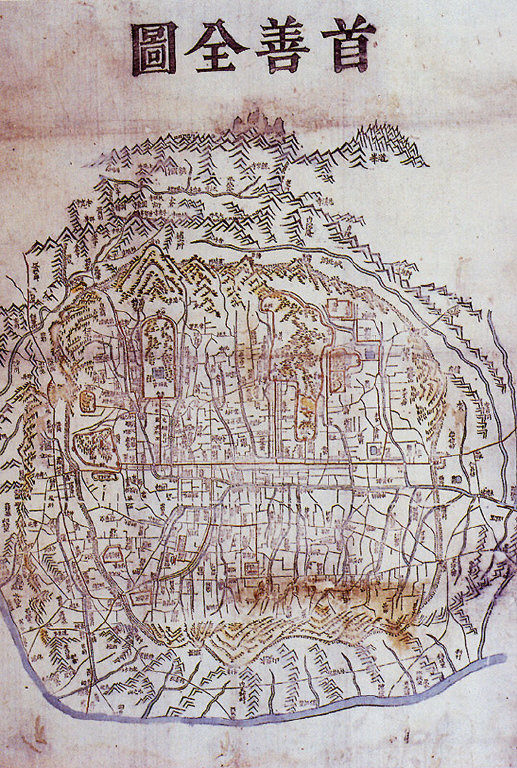
Suseon jeondo

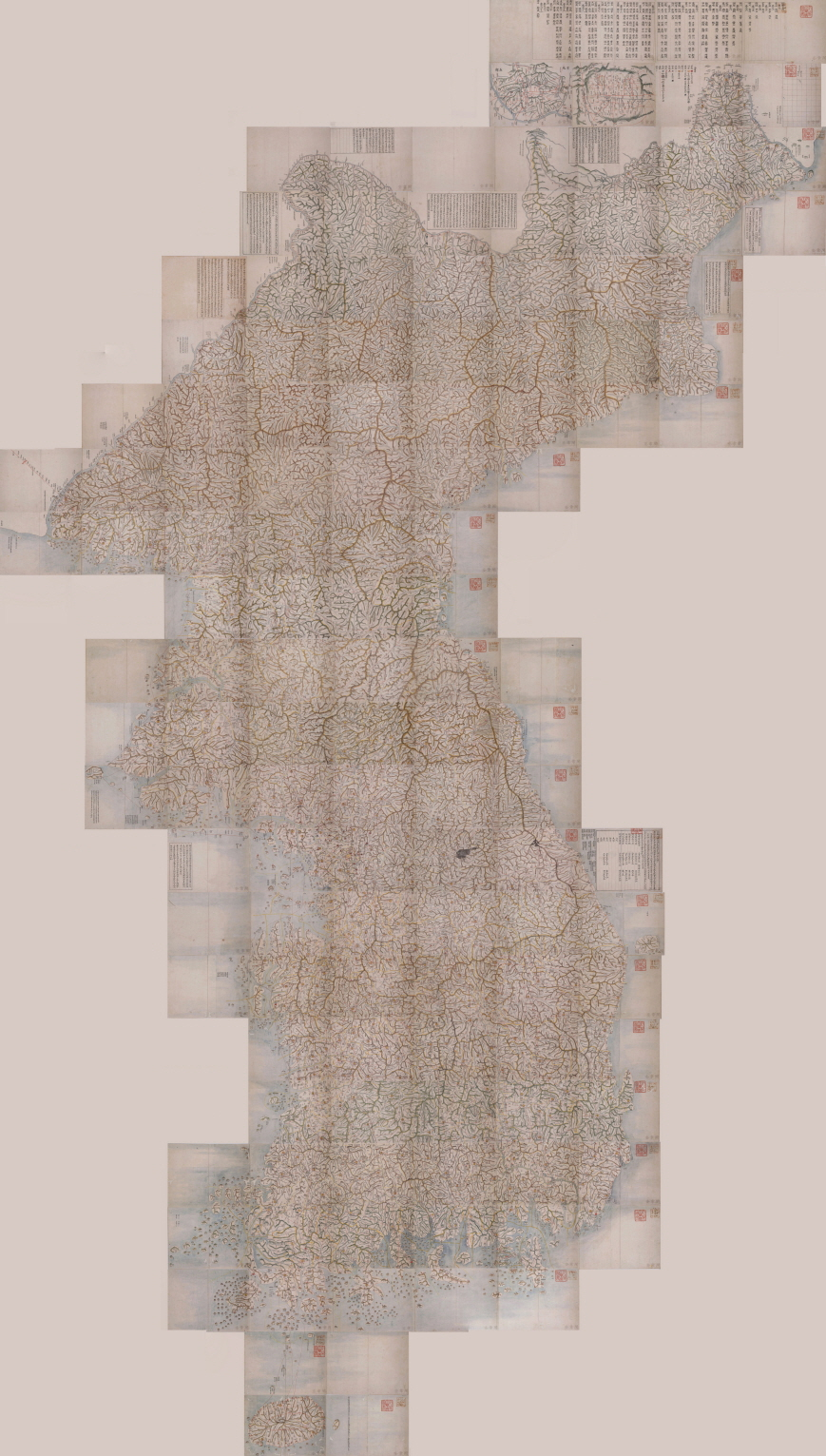
Dongyeodo

== See also ==
- Geography of South Korea
- Geography of North Korea
