= Liancourt Rocks =

Group of disputed islets in the Sea of Japan

Disputed islands
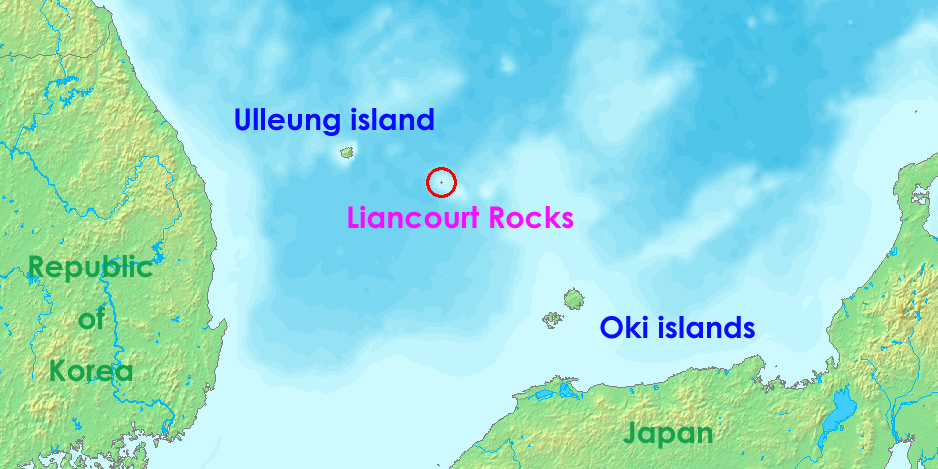

- The two main islets
- Other names: Liancourt Islets, Liancourt Islands, Takeshima, Dokdo, Tok Islets, Hornet Islands, Kajido, Sambongdo

Geography
- Location: Sea of Japan
- Coordinates: 37°14′30″N 131°52′0″E
- Total islands: 91 (37 permanent land)
- Major islands: East Islet, West Islet
- Area: 18.745 ha (46.32 acres); East Islet: 7.33 hectares (18.1 acres); West Islet: 8.864 hectares (21.90 acres)
- Highest elevation: 169 m (554 ft)
- Highest point: West Islet

Administration
- South Korea
- County: Ulleung County, North Gyeongsang

Claimed by
- Japan
- Town: Okinoshima, Shimane (Japan)

Demographics
- Population: Approximately 25

The Liancourt Rocks, known in Korea as Dokdo (Korean: 독도) (Note: Hanja: 獨島; IPA: [tok̚t͈o]; lit. 'solitary island[s]' or 'lonely island[s]'.) and in Japan as Takeshima (Japanese: 竹島), (Note: IPA: [takeɕima]; lit. 'bamboo island[s]'.) are a group of islets in the Sea of Japan between the Korean Peninsula and the Japanese archipelago administered by South Korea. The Liancourt Rocks comprise two main islets and 89 smaller rocks; the total surface area of the islets is 19 hectares (47 acres) and the highest elevation of 168.5 metres (553 ft) is on the West Islet. The Liancourt Rocks lie in rich fishing grounds that may contain large deposits of natural gas. The English name Liancourt Rocks is derived from Le Liancourt, (Note: Pronounced [lə ljɑ̃kuʁ]; named in honor of François Alexandre Frédéric, Duke of La Rochefoucauld and Liancourt.) the name of a French whaling ship that came close to being wrecked on the rocks in 1849.

South Korea exercises sovereignty over the islets, while Japan claims sovereignty over them. The South Korean government's stated position is that the islets are an integral part of Korean territory historically, geographically and under international law, that no territorial dispute exists over them, and that they are therefore not a matter to be dealt with through diplomatic negotiation or judicial settlement. North Korea formerly claimed the territory, but has reportedly ceased its claim, following the country's abandoning of all goals of reunification with the South. South Korea classifies the islets as Dokdo-ri, Ulleung-eup, Ulleung County, North Gyeongsang Province, while Japan classifies the islands as part of Okinoshima, Oki District, Shimane Prefecture.

== Geography ==
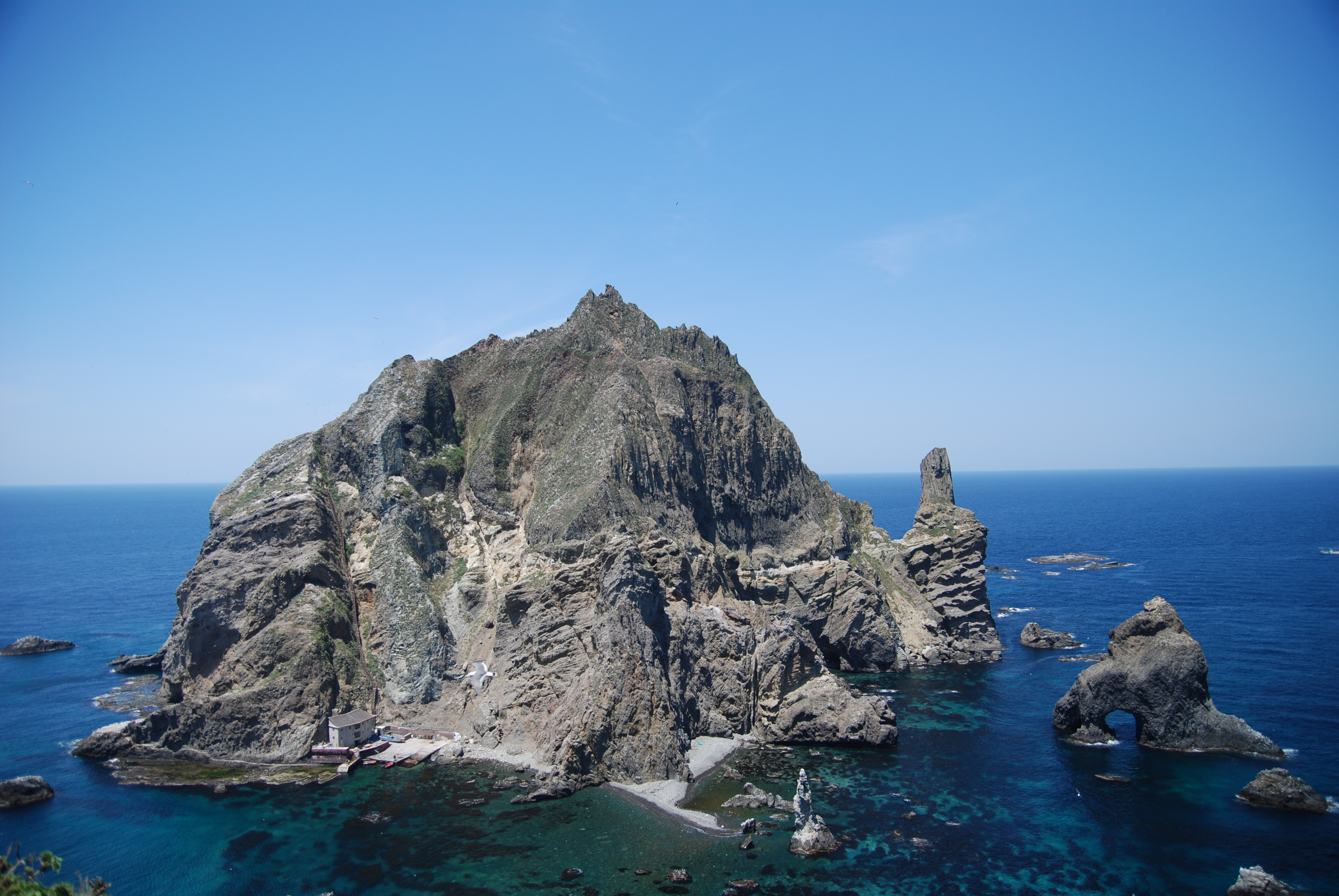

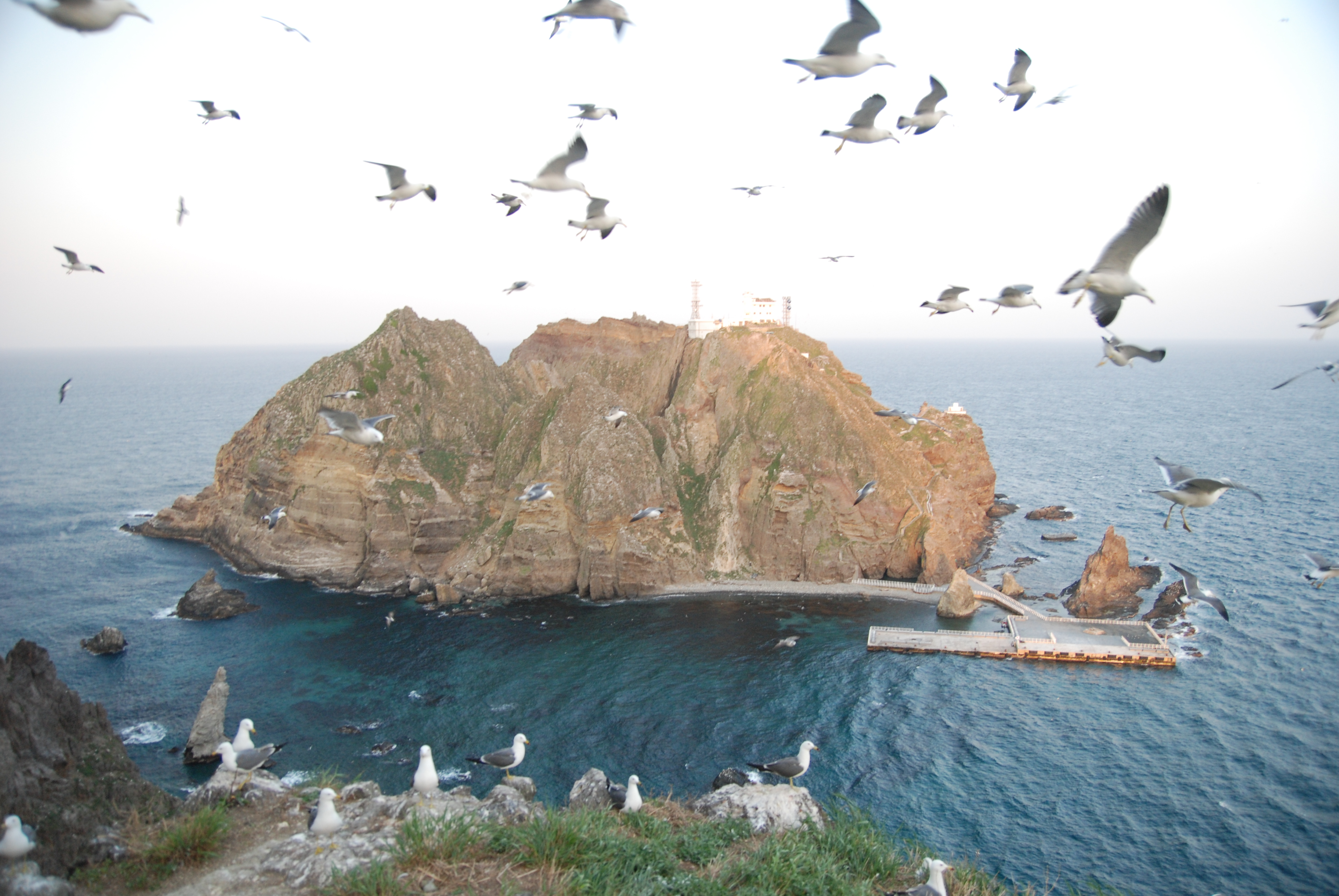
The West island (top) and the East island (bottom)

The Liancourt Rocks consist of two main islets and numerous surrounding rocks. The two main islets, called Seodo (서도; 西島; lit. 'western island') and Dongdo (동도; 東島; lit. 'eastern island') in Korean and Ojima (男島; "Male Island") and Mejima (女島; "Female Island") in Japanese, are 151 metres (495 ft) apart. The Western Island is the larger of the two, with a wider base and higher peak, while the Eastern Island offers more usable surface area.

Altogether, there are about 90 islets and reefs, volcanic rocks formed in the Cenozoic era, more specifically 4.6 to 2.5 million years ago. A total of 37 of these islets are recognized as permanent land.

The total area of the islets is about 187,554 square metres (46.346 acres), with their highest point at 168.5 metres (553 ft) on the West Islet. The western islet is about 88,740 square metres (21.93 acres); the eastern islet is about 73,300 square metres (18.1 acres). The western islet consists of a single peak and features many caves along the coastline. The cliffs of the eastern islet are about 10 to 20 metres (33 to 66 ft) high. There are two large caves giving access to the sea, as well as a crater.

In 2006, a geologist reported that the islets formed 4.5 million years ago and are (in a geological sense) quickly eroding.

== Tourism ==
Restricted public access to the rocks for a variety of purposes is provided by ferry from Ulleungdo. In 2025, 192,122 tourists visited the islands, averaging 500 visitors per day.

== Distances ==
The Liancourt Rocks are located at about 37°14′N 131°52′E. The western islet is located at 37°14′31″N 131°51′55″E and the Eastern Islet is located at 37°14′27″N 131°52′10″E.

The Liancourt Rocks are situated at a distance of 211 kilometres (114 nmi) from the main island of Japan (Honshu) and 216.8 kilometres (117.1 nmi) from mainland South Korea. The nearest Japanese island, Oki Islands, is at a distance of 157 kilometres (85 nmi), and the nearest Korean island, Ulleungdo, is 87.4 kilometres (47.2 nmi).

== Climate ==
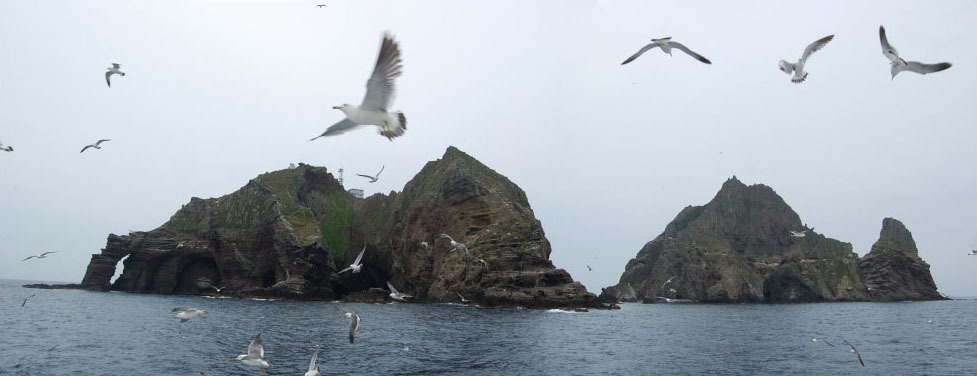
The Liancourt Rocks viewed from the North

Owing to their location and small size, the Liancourt Rocks can have harsh weather. If the swell is greater than 3 to 5 metres, then landing is not possible, so on average ferries can only dock about once in forty days. Overall, the climate is warm and humid, and heavily influenced by warm sea currents. Precipitation is high throughout the year (annual average—about 1,048 to 1,400 millimetres or 41.3 to 55.1 inches), with occasional snowfall. Fog is common. In summer, southerly winds dominate. The water around the islets is about 10 °C (50 °F) in early spring, when the water is coldest, warming to about 24 °C (75 °F) in late summer.

== Ecology ==
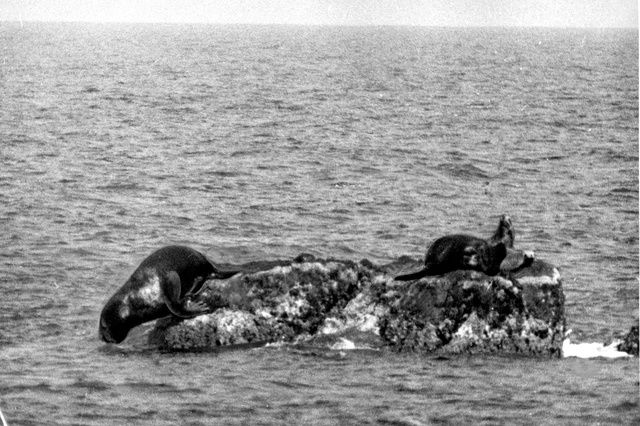
Japanese sea lions at Liancourt Rocks during a Japanese sealing operation in 1934

The islets are volcanic rocks, with only a thin layer of soil and moss. About 49 plant species, 107 bird species, and 93 insect species have been found to inhabit the islets, in addition to local marine life with 160 algal and 368 invertebrate species identified. Although between 1,100 and 1,200 litres of fresh water flow daily, desalination plants have been installed on the islets for human consumption because existing spring water suffers from guano contamination. Since the early 1970s trees and some types of flowers were planted. According to historical records, there used to be trees indigenous to Liancourt Rocks, which have supposedly been wiped out by overharvesting and fires caused by bombing drills over the islets. (Note: "There are records attesting to the existence of trees [on Liancourt Rocks] in the past". (BAEK In-ki, SHIM Mun-bo & Korea Maritime Institute 2006, p. 48)) A recent investigation, however, identified ten spindle trees aged 100–120 years. Cetaceans such as minke whales, orcas, and dolphins are known to migrate through these areas.

=== Environmental protection ===
Records of the human impact on the Liancourt Rocks before the late 20th century are scarce, although both Japanese and Koreans claim to have felled trees and captured Japanese sea lions there for many decades.

It is ecologically significant as a habitat for numerous seabirds as well as diverse plant and marine life. Because of its unique vegetation, geological features, and wildlife habitat, the Republic of Korea designated it as Natural Monument in November 1982, recognizing its high natural and scientific value under the country’s cultural heritage protection framework. There has been on-going efforts to protect and preserve the surrounding environment.

==== Natural Monument of South Korea ====
The Liancourt Rocks were designated as a breeding ground for band-rumped storm petrels, streaked shearwaters, and black-tailed gulls as Natural Monument #336 of South Korea on November 29, 1982.

== Construction ==
South Korea has carried out construction work on the Liancourt Rocks; by 2009, the islands had a lighthouse, helicopter pad, and a police barracks. In 2007, two desalination plants were built capable of producing 28 tons of clean water every day. Both of the major South Korean telecommunications companies have installed cellular telephone towers on the islets.

== History ==
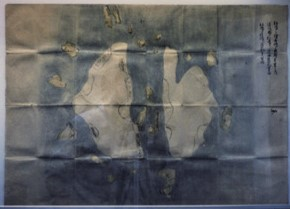
Japanese map depicting the Liancourt Rocks in Matsushima Ezu (松嶋絵図), 1656 (Tottori Prefecture)

=== Whaling ===
U.S. and French whaleships cruised for right whales off the rocks between 1849 and 1892.

=== Demographics and economy ===
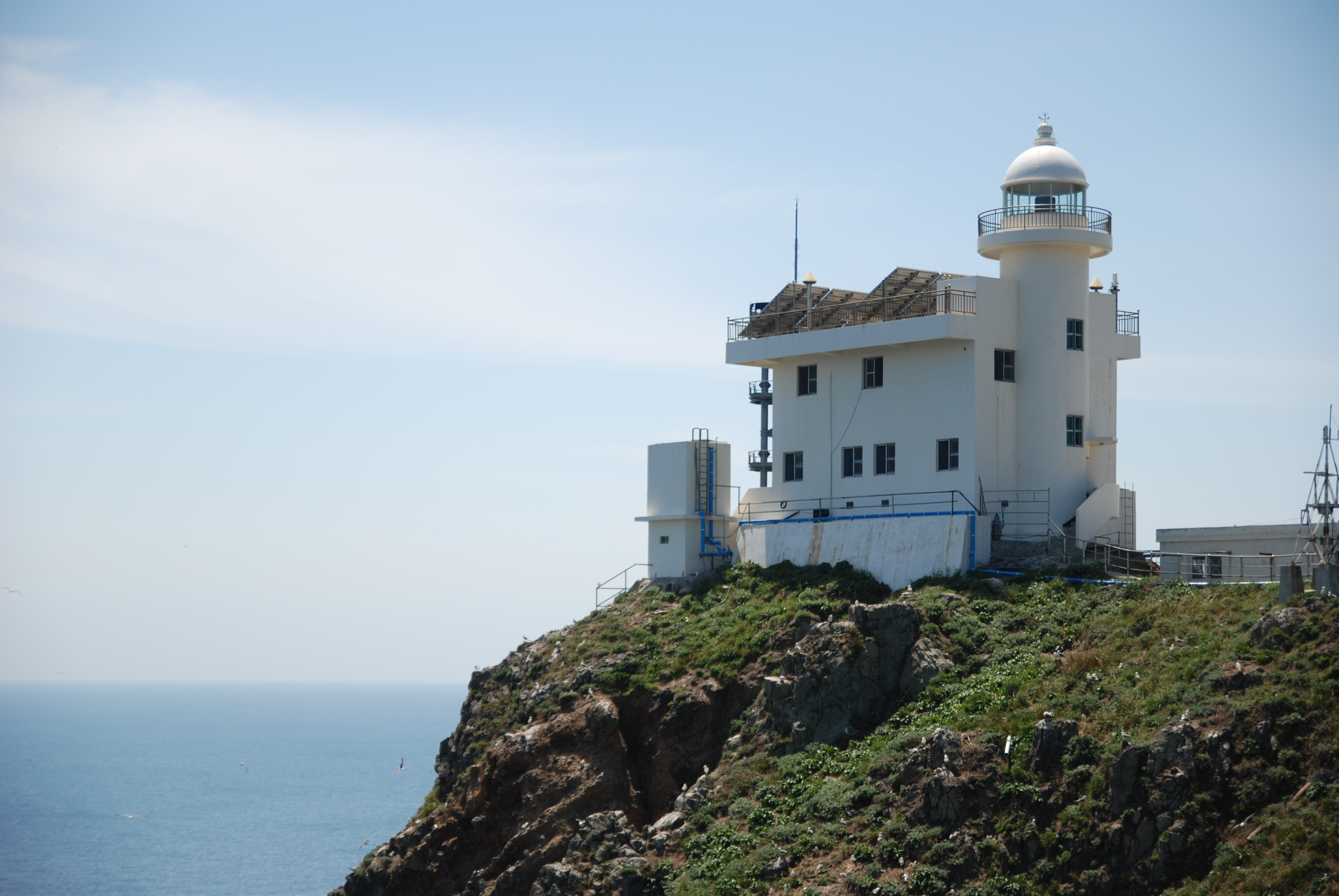
The base that houses South Korean police guards on the Liancourt Rocks' East Islet

As of March 2026, there are three office staff, two lighthouse managers, and twenty police personnel living on the islets. Since the South Korean coast guard was sent to the islets, civilian travel has been subject to South Korean government approval; they have stated that the reason for this is that the islet group is designated as a nature reserve.

In March 1965, Choi Jong-duk moved from the nearby Ulleungdo to the islets to make a living from octopus fishing. He also helped install facilities from May 1968. In 1981, Choi Jong-duk changed his administrative address to the Liancourt Rocks, making himself the first person to officially live there. He died there in September 1987. His son-in-law, Cho Jun-ki, and his wife also resided there from 1985 until they moved out in 1992. Meanwhile, in 1991, Kim Sung-do and Kim Shin-yeol transferred to the islets as permanent residents. In October 2018, Kim Sung-do died, followed by Kim Shin-yeol in March 2026, meaning there are currently no resident civilians.

The South Korean government gave its approval to allow 1,597 visitors to visit the islets in 2004. Since March 2005, more tourists have received approval to visit. The South Korean government lets up to 70 tourists land at any given time; one ferry provides rides to the islets every day. Tour companies charge around 350,000 Korean won per person (about US$310 as of 2019).

=== Sovereignty dispute ===
Sovereignty over the islands has been an ongoing point of contention in Japan–South Korea relations. There are conflicting interpretations about the historical state of sovereignty over the islets.

South Korean claims are partly based on references to an island called Usando (우산도; 于山島; 亐山島) in various medieval historical records, maps, and encyclopedia such as Samguk Sagi, Annals of Joseon Dynasty, Dongguk Yeoji Seungnam, and Dongguk munhon bigo. According to the South Korean view, these refer to today's Liancourt Rocks. Japanese researchers of these documents have claimed the various references to Usan-do refer at different times to Jukdo, its neighboring island Ulleungdo, or a non-existent island between Ulleungdo and Korea. (Note: "Such description ... rather reminds us of Utsuryo Island" (para. 2); "A study ... criticizes ... that Usan Island and Utsuryo Island are two names for one island" (para. 3); and "that island does not exist at all in reality" (para. 4). "10 Issues of Takeshima, MOFA (Article 2)" (PDF). Ministry of Foreign Affairs (Japan). February 2008. p. 4. Archived from the original (PDF) on 13 September 2008.) The logbook of the Japanese warship Niitaka, dated 25 September 1904, records that Koreans wrote the name of the islets as Dokdo. South Korea cites this entry as evidence that the Korean name was in use, and known to Japanese officials, several months before Japan incorporated the islets into Shimane Prefecture in 1905.

North Korea formerly claimed the islands as its own and contested Japan's claim to the islands alongside South Korea's. However, it is said that following North Korea's abandoning of its long-term goal of reunification with South Korea in 2024, so has their claims on the Liancourt Rocks; this is evident through the omission of territories administered by the South from its maps, including geographical points such as Marado and Dokdo (Liancourt Rocks).

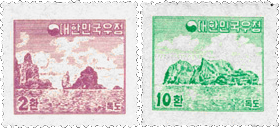
South Korean stamps depicting the Liancourt Rocks from 1954

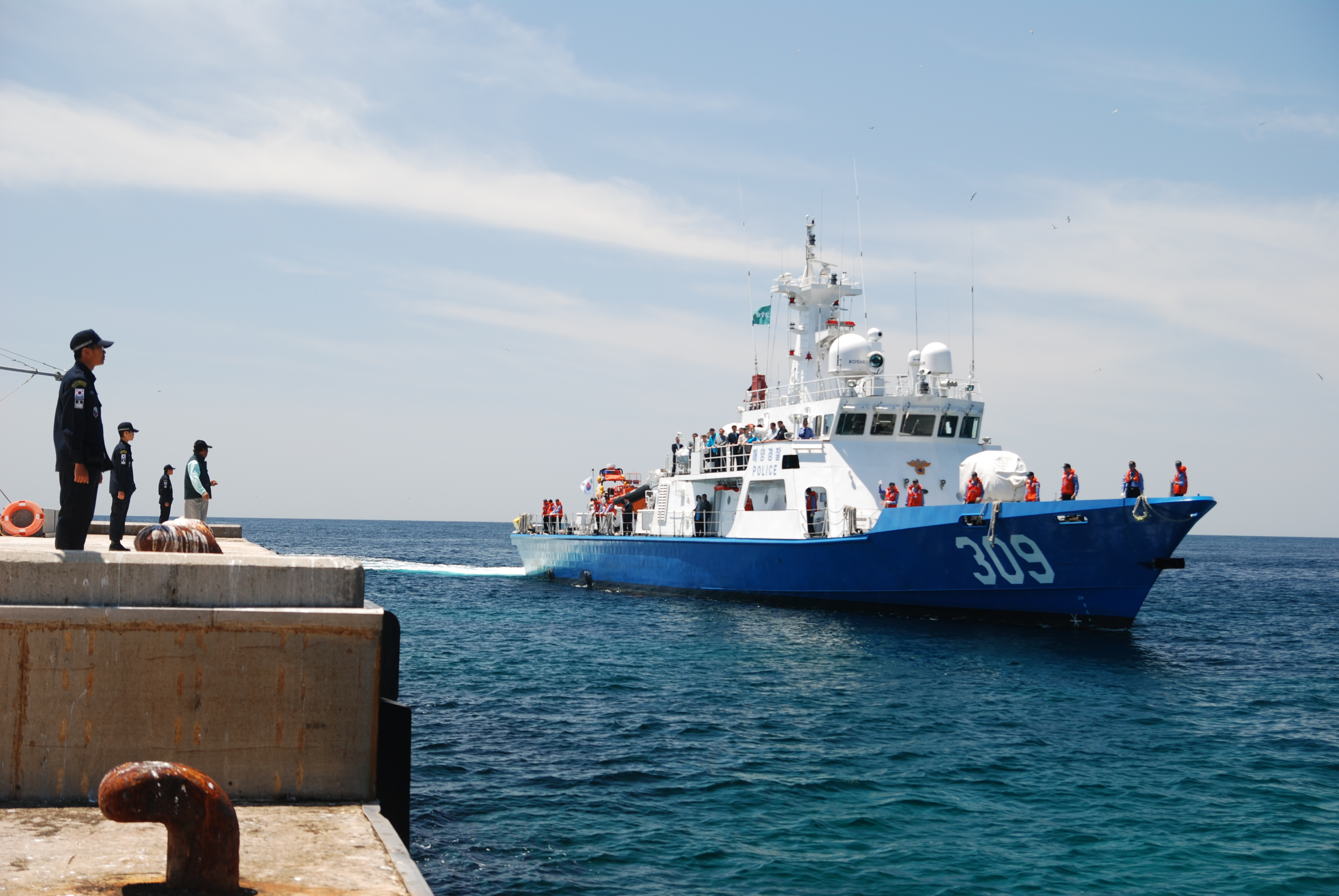
A South Korean police boat approaches the dock on the Liancourt Rocks' East Islet.

== See also ==
- Dokdo Volunteer Garrison
- Rusk documents

== Inline citations ==
=== References ===
- BAEK In-ki; SHIM Mun-bo; Korea Maritime Institute (December 2006), A study of Distance between Ulleungdo and Dokdo and Ocean Currents (울릉도와 독도의 거리와 해류에 관한 연구), pp. 20–22, ISBN 978-89-7998-340-1
- BBC staff (20 April 2006), Seoul and Tokyo hold island talks, BBC
- BBC staff (27 July 2008), "Island row hits Japanese condoms", BBC News
- Fern, Sean (Winter 2005), "Tokdo or Takeshima? The International Law of Territorial Acquisition in the Japan-Korea Island Dispute", Stanford Journal of East Asian Affairs, 5 (1)
- Gyeongsangbuk-do Province (28 September 2017a), "Climate", Dokdo, Beautiful island of Korea, Korean Government
- Gyeongsangbuk-do Province (28 September 2017b), "Composition", Dokdo, Beautiful island of Korea, Korean Government
- Gyeongsangbuk-do Province (28 September 2017c), "Location", Dokdo, Beautiful island of Korea, Korean Government
- Gyeo ngbuk Province (2001a), "Natural Environment", Cyber Dokdo, Korean Government, archived from the original on 29 July 2014
- Gyeo ngbuk Province (2001b), "Visit Dokdo", Cyber Dokdo, Korean Government, archived from the original on 29 July 2014
- Ha, Michael (26 August 2008), "A Unique Trip to Dokdo—Islets in the News", The Korea Times, archived from the original on 4 March 2016
- Kirk, Donald (26 July 2008), "Seoul has desert island dreams", Asia Times Online, archived from the original on 1 March 2009
- KOIS staff (12 January 2007), Cell phones give Korean ring to Dokdo, Korea.net, archived from the original on 2 March 2009
- KOIS staff (12 June 2007a), Doosan pours big drink for Dokdo residents, Korea.net, archived from the original on 2 March 2009
- Choe, Sang-Hun (28 August 2008), "A fierce Korean pride in a lonely group of islets", International Herald Tribune, archived from the original on 28 August 2008
- Yonhap staff (20 July 2011), N. Korea denounces Japan's vow to visit island near Dokdo, Yonhap News Agency
