= Donghae Bukbu Line (1929–1945) =

1929–1945 railway line in Korea

Overview
- Native name: 동해북부선 (東海北部線)
- Status: Divided
- Locale: Gangwon Province, Korea
- Termini: Anbyeon; Yangyang
- Stations: 29

Service
- Type: Heavy rail, Freight rail
- Operator(s): Chosen Government Railway

History
- Opened: Stages between 1929 and 1937

Technical
- Line length: 192.6 km (119.7 mi)
- Number of tracks: Single track
- Track gauge: 1,435 mm (4 ft 8 1/2 in) standard gauge

- Donghae Bukbu Line
- Hangul: 동해북부선
- Hanja: 東海北部線
- Revised Romanization: Donghae Bukbuseon
- McCune–Reischauer: Tonghae Pukpusŏn

The Donghae Bukbu Line (東海北部線, Tōkai Hokubu-sen) was a railway line of the Chosen Government Railway (Sentetsu) in Korea connecting Anbyeon with Yangyang.

== History ==
The line was originally opened in several stages, with the first section from Anbyeon on Sentetsu's Gyeongwon Line to Heupgok being opened in 1929, and finally reaching Yangyang in 1937. Plans existed to extend the line south from Yangyang to Pohang Station, where it would have connected with the Donghae Nambu Line; however, this extension could not be completed before Japan's defeat in the Pacific War, and the plans were abandoned.

After the partition of Korea, the line was split between the North and South, with the section from Anbyeon to Samilpo becoming the Kŭmgangsan Ch'ŏngnyŏn Line in the north, while the section from Chogu to Yangyang became the Donghae Bukbu Line operated by the Korean National Railroad.

Date	Section	Length
1 September 1929	Anbyeon–Heupgok	31.4 km
21 July 1931	Heupgok–Tongcheon	29.6 km
21 May 1932	Tongcheon–Dubaek	14.7 km
1 August 1932	Dubaek–Jangjeon	17.5 km
16 September 1932	Jangjeon–Oegeumgang	7.8 km
1 November 1935	Oegeumgang–Ganseong	49.7 km
1 December 1937	Ganseong–Yangyang	41.9 km

== Route ==
Stations as of 1945
Distance		Station name					
Total; km	S2S; km	Transcribed, Korean	Transcribed, Japanese	Hunminjeongeum	Hanja/Kanji	Opening date Original owner	Connections
0.0	0.0	Anbyeon	Anpen	안변	安辺	21 August 1913	Sentetsu Gyeongwon Line
8.9	8.9	Ogye	Gokei	오계	梧渓	1 September 1929	
14.9	6.0	Sang'eum	Sōin	상음	桑陰	1 September 1929	
25.2	10.3	Jadong	Jitō	자동	慈東	1 September 1929	
31.4	6.2	Heupgok	Kyūkoku	흡곡	歙谷	1 September 1929	
38.0	6.6	Paecheon	Haisen	패천	沛川	21 July 1931	
47.4	9.4	Songjeon	Shōden	송전	松田	21 July 1931	
54.3	6.9	Gojeo	Kotei	고저	庫底	21 July 1931	
61.0	6.7	Tongcheon	Tsūsen	통천	通川	21 July 1931	
70.2	9.2	Yeomseong	Renjō	염성	溓城	21 May 1932	
75.7	5.5	Dubaek	Tōhaku	두백	荳白	21 May 1932	
86.2	10.5	Nam'ae	Nangai	남애	南涯	1 August 1932	
93.2	7.0	Jangjeon	Chōsen	장전	長箭	1 August 1932	
101.0	7.8	Oegeumgang	Gaikongō	외금강	外金剛	16 September 1932	
109.2	8.2	Samilpo	San'nippo	삼일포	三日浦	1 November 1935	
111.4	2.2	Goseong	Kōjō	고성	高城	1 November 1935	
119.9	8.5	Chogu	Sōkyū	초구	草邱	1 November 1935	
125.9	6.0	Jejin Station	Choshin	제진	猪津	1 November 1935	
135.9	10.0	Hyeonnae	Ken'nai	현내	県内	1 November 1935	
143.3	7.4	Geojin	Kyoshin	거진	巨津	1 November 1935	
150.7	7.4	Ganseong	Kanjō	간성	杆城	1 November 1935	
157.4	6.7	Gonghyeonjin	Kōkenshin	공현진	公峴津	1 December 1937	
163.3	5.9	Mun'am	Bungan	문암	文岩	1 December 1937	
169.2	5.9	Cheonjilli	Tenshinri	천진리	天津里	1 December 1937	
175.7	6.5	Sokcho	Sokusō	속초	束草	1 December 1937	
181.5	5.8	Daepo	Taiho	대포	大浦	1 December 1937	
185.2	3.7	Naksansa	Rakuzanji	낙산사	洛山寺	1 December 1937	
192.6	7.4	Yangyang	Jōyō	양양	襄陽	1 December 1937	
