= Sijungho station =

Railway station in North Korea

Sijungho 시중호

Korean name
- Hangul: 시중호역
- Hanja: 侍中湖驛
- Revised Romanization: Sijungho-yeok
- McCune–Reischauer: Sijungho-yŏk

General information
- Location: Songjŏl-li; T'ongch'ŏn, Kangwŏn Province; North Korea
- Coordinates: 38.9838°N 127.8459°E
- Owner: Korean State Railway
- Line: Kŭmgangsan Ch'ŏngnyŏn Line

History
- Opened: 21 July 1931
- Former names: Songjŏn
- Original company: Chosen Government Railway

Services
Preceding station	Korean State Railway	Following station
Kŭmbonggang towards Anbyŏn	Kŭmgangsan Ch'ŏngnyŏn Line	T'ongch'ŏn towards Jejin (ROK)
Location

Sijungho station is a railway station in Songjŏl-li T'ongch'ŏn county, Kangwŏn province, North Korea on the Kŭmgangsan Ch'ŏngnyŏn Line of the Korean State Railway.

== History ==
The station, originally called Songjŏn station was opened on 21 July 1931 by the Chosen Government Railway, along with the rest of the second section of the original Tonghae Pukpu Line from Hŭpkok (nowadays Myŏnggo) to T'ongch'ŏn (nowadays Tonghae). It was renamed after Lake Sijung.
