= Sangum Chongnyon station =

Railway station in North Korea

Sangŭm Ch'ŏngnyŏn 상음청년

Korean name
- Hangul: 상음청년역
- Hanja: 桑陰青年驛
- Revised Romanization: Sangeum Cheongnyeon-yeok
- McCune–Reischauer: Sangŭm Ch'ŏngnyŏn-yŏk

General information
- Location: Sangŭm-ri; Anbyŏn, Kangwŏn Province; North Korea
- Coordinates: 39.1323°N 127.6052°E
- Owner: Korean State Railway
- Line: Kŭmgangsan Ch'ŏngnyŏn Line

History
- Opened: 1 September 1929
- Former names: Sangŭm
- Original company: Chosen Government Railway

Services
Preceding station	Korean State Railway	Following station
Ogye towards Anbyŏn	Kŭmgangsan Ch'ŏngnyŏn Line	Tongjŏngho towards Jejin (ROK)
Location

Sangŭm Ch'ŏngnyŏn station is a railway station in Sangŭm-ri, T'ongch'ŏn county, Kangwŏn province, North Korea on the Kŭmgangsan Ch'ŏngnyŏn Line of the Korean State Railway.

== History ==
The station, originally called Sangŭm station was opened on 1 September 1929 by the Chosen Government Railway, along with the rest of the first section of the original Tonghae Pukpu Line from Anbyŏn to Hŭpkok.
