= Ogye station =

Railway station in North Korea

Ogye 오계

Korean name
- Hangul: 오계역
- Hanja: 梧渓驛
- Revised Romanization: Ogye-yeok
- McCune–Reischauer: Ogye-yŏk

General information
- Location: Ogye-ri; Anbyŏn, Kangwŏn Province; North Korea
- Coordinates: 39.0995°N 127.5554°E
- Owner: Korean State Railway
- Line: Kŭmgangsan Ch'ŏngnyŏn Line

History
- Opened: 1 September 1929
- Original company: Chosen Government Railway

Services
| Preceding station | Korean State Railway | Following station |
|---|---|---|
| Anbyŏn Terminus | Kŭmgangsan Ch'ŏngnyŏn Line | Sangŭm Ch'ŏngnyŏn towards Jejin (ROK) |
Location

Ogye station is a railway station in Ogye-ri, T'ongch'ŏn county, Kangwŏn province, North Korea on the Kŭmgangsan Ch'ŏngnyŏn Line of the Korean State Railway.

== History ==
The station was opened on 1 September 1929 by the Chosen Government Railway, along with the rest of the first section of the original Tonghae Pukpu Line from Anbyŏn to Hŭpkok.
