= Tongchon station =

Railway station in North Korea

T'ongch'ŏn 동천

Korean name
- Hangul: 통천역
- Hanja: 通川驛
- Revised Romanization: Tongcheon-yeok
- McCune–Reischauer: T'ongch'ŏn-yŏk

General information
- Location: T'ongch'ŏn-ŭp, T'ongch'ŏn, Kangwon Province; North Korea
- Coordinates: 38.9481°N 127.8897°E
- Owner: Korean State Railway
- Line: Kŭmgangsan Ch'ŏngnyŏn Line

History
- Opened: 21 July 1931
- Former names: Kojŏ
- Original company: Chosen Government Railway

Services
Preceding station	Korean State Railway	Following station
Sijungho towards Anbyŏn	Kŭmgangsan Ch'ŏngnyŏn Line	Tonghae towards Jejin (ROK)
Location

T'ongch'ŏn station is a railway station in T'ongch'ŏn-ŭp, T'ongch'ŏn county, Kangwŏn province, North Korea on the Kŭmgangsan Ch'ŏngnyŏn Line of the Korean State Railway.

== History ==
The station, originally called Kojŏ station, was opened on 21 July 1931 by the Chosen Government Railway, along with the rest of the second section of the original Tonghae Pukpu Line from Hŭpkok (nowadays called Myŏnggo) to the original T'ongch'ŏn station (nowadays called Tonghae).
