= Tupo station =

Railway station in North Korea

Tup'o 두포

Korean name
- Hangul: 두포역
- Hanja: 豆浦驛
- Revised Romanization: Dupo-yeok
- McCune–Reischauer: Tup'o-yŏk

General information
- Location: Tup'o-ri, Kosŏng, Kangwŏn Province; North Korea
- Coordinates: 38.8459°N 128.0545°E
- Owner: Korean State Railway
- Line: Kŭmgangsan Ch'ŏngnyŏn Line

History
- Opened: 21 May 1932
- Former names: Tubaek
- Original company: Chosen Government Railway

Services
Preceding station	Korean State Railway	Following station
Ryŏmsŏng towards Anbyŏn	Kŭmgangsan Ch'ŏngnyŏn Line	Nam'ae towards Jejin (ROK)
Location

Tup'o station is a railway station in Tup'o-ri, Kosŏng county, Kangwŏn province, North Korea on the Kŭmgangsan Ch'ŏngnyŏn Line of the Korean State Railway.

== History ==
The station, originally called Tubaek station, was opened on 21 May 1932 by the Chosen Government Railway, along with the rest of the third section of the original Tonghae Pukpu Line from T'ongch'ŏn (nowadays Tonghae) to here.
