= Kosong station =

Railway station in North Korea

Kosŏng 고성

Korean name
- Hangul: 고성역
- Hanja: 高城驛
- Revised Romanization: Goseong-yeok
- McCune–Reischauer: Kosŏng-yŏk

General information
- Location: Kosŏng-ŭp, Kosŏng, Kangwŏn Province; North Korea
- Coordinates: 38.7442°N 128.1770°E
- Owner: Korean State Railway
- Line: Kŭmgangsan Ch'ŏngnyŏn Line

History
- Opened: 1 August 1932
- Former names: Changjŏn
- Original company: Chosen Government Railway

Services
Preceding station	Korean State Railway	Following station
Nam'ae towards Anbyŏn	Kŭmgangsan Ch'ŏngnyŏn Line	Kŭmgangsan Ch'ŏngnyŏn towards Jejin (ROK)
Location

Kosŏng station is a railway station in Kosŏng-ŭp, Kosŏng county, Kangwŏn province, North Korea on the Kŭmgangsan Ch'ŏngnyŏn Line of the Korean State Railway.

== History ==
The station, originally called Changjŏn station, was opened on 1 August 1932 by the Chosen Government Railway, along with the rest of the fourth section of the original Tonghae Pukpu Line from Tup'o to here.
