= Namae station =

Railway station in North Korea

Namae 남애

Korean name
- Hangul: 남애역
- Hanja: 南涯驛
- Revised Romanization: Namae-yeok
- McCune–Reischauer: Namae-yŏk

General information
- Location: Namae-ri, Kosŏng, Kangwŏn Province; North Korea
- Owner: Korean State Railway
- Line: Kŭmgangsan Ch'ŏngnyŏn Line

History
- Opened: 1 August 1932
- Original company: Chosen Government Railway

Services
Preceding station	Korean State Railway	Following station
Tup'o towards Anbyŏn	Kŭmgangsan Ch'ŏngnyŏn Line	Kosŏng towards Jejin (ROK)
Location

Namae station is a railway station in Namae-ri, Kosŏng county, Kangwŏn province, North Korea on the Kŭmgangsan Ch'ŏngnyŏn Line of the Korean State Railway.

== History ==
The station was opened on 1 August 1932 by the Chosen Government Railway, along with the rest of the fourth section of the original Tonghae Pukpu Line from Tubaek to Changjŏn.
