= Tongjongho station =

Train station in North Korea

Tongjŏngho 동정호

Korean name
- Hangul: 동정호역
- Hanja: 洞庭湖驛
- Revised Romanization: Dongjeongho-yeok
- McCune–Reischauer: Tongjŏngho-yŏk

General information
- Location: T'ongch'ŏn, Kangwŏn Province; North Korea
- Coordinates: 39.1039°N 127.6979°E
- Owner: Korean State Railway
- Line: Kŭmgangsan Ch'ŏngnyŏn Line

History
- Opened: 1 September 1929
- Former names: Chadong
- Original company: Chosen Government Railway

Services
Preceding station	Korean State Railway	Following station
Sangŭm Ch'ŏngnyŏn towards Anbyŏn	Kŭmgangsan Ch'ŏngnyŏn Line	Myŏnggo towards Jejin (ROK)
Location

Tongjŏngho station is a railway station in T'ongch'ŏn county, Kangwŏn province, North Korea on the Kŭmgangsan Ch'ŏngnyŏn Line of the Korean State Railway.

== History ==
The station, originally called Chadong station was opened on 1 September 1929 by the Chosen Government Railway, along with the rest of the first section of the original Tonghae Pukpu Line from Anbyŏn to Hŭpkok. An air defense missile base is located in the vicinity of the station.
