= Ryomsong station =

Railway station in North Korea

Ryŏmsŏng 렴성

Korean name
- Hangul: 렴성역
- Hanja: 濂城驛
- Revised Romanization: Yeomseong-yeok
- McCune–Reischauer: Ryŏmsŏng-yŏk

General information
- Location: Ryŏmsŏng-ri, Kosŏng, Kangwŏn Province; North Korea
- Coordinates: 38.8561°N 127.9944°E
- Owner: Korean State Railway
- Line: Kŭmgangsan Ch'ŏngnyŏn Line

History
- Opened: 21 May 1932
- Original company: Chosen Government Railway

Services
Preceding station	Korean State Railway	Following station
Tonghae towards Anbyŏn	Kŭmgangsan Ch'ŏngnyŏn Line	Tup'o towards Jejin (ROK)
Location

Ryŏmsŏng station is a railway station in Ryŏmsŏng-ri, Kosŏng county, Kangwŏn province, North Korea on the Kŭmgangsan Ch'ŏngnyŏn Line of the Korean State Railway.

== History ==
The station was opened on 21 May 1932 by the Chosen Government Railway, along with the rest of the third section of the original Tonghae Pukpu Line from T'ongch'ŏn (nowadays Tonghae) to Tup'o.
