= Kosong County =

Coordinates: 38°40′05″N 128°19′05″E

Kosŏng County 고성군
- County

Korean transcription(s)
  - Chosŏn'gŭl: 고성군
  - Hancha: 高城郡
  - McCune-Reischauer: Kosŏng-gun
  - Revised Romanization: Goseong-gun
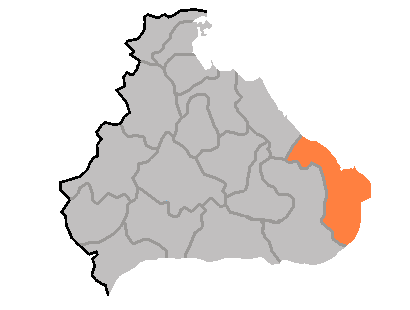
- Map of Kangwon showing the location of Kosong
- Country: North Korea
- Province: Kangwŏn Province
- Administrative divisions: 1 ŭp, 23 ri

Area
  - Total: 863 km^{2} (333 sq mi)

Population (2008)
  - Total: 61,277
  - Density: 71.0/km^{2} (184/sq mi)

Kosŏng ([ˈkɤsɔŋ‿ɡun]) is a kun, or county, in Kangwŏn province, North Korea. It lies in the southeasternmost corner of North Korea, immediately north of the Korean Demilitarized Zone. Prior to the end of the Korean War in 1953, it made up a single county, together with what is now the South Korean county of the same name. In a subsequent reorganization, the county absorbed the southern portion of Tongch'ŏn county.

== History ==
=== Ancient times ===
The region that forms modern day Kosong County of North Korea and Hyeonnaemyeon (of Goseong County, Gangwon) was called Dalhol (達忽,달홀) in the days of the kingdom of Goguryeo, which meant "high mountainous village" in the local language back then (The region that is modern day Goseong County, Gangwon of South Korea was called Suseong (守城)). The name of the region was changed to Dalhol Province in 568. This name was changed to Kosong (高城) County in 748 under the kingdom of Unified Silla, which meant the same, but in Hanja. During the kingdom of Goryeo, the county was initially administered under the province of Sakbangdo. It also later was administered as Kosong prefecture under the subdivision of Dongye of Goryeo (Suseong was also administered under Dongye as Suseong County but it later was called Kanseong County(杆城郡)). The region was also called as Pungam (豊巖, 풍암), named as such for the region's abunduant rocks. During the early Joseon period, it was initially administered as the Kosong prefecture under Kansong County under Kangwon Province until the reign of Sejong the Great when it was made into a county of its own, separate from Kansong County. Due to a controversy surrounding a slave killing its owner in the region, it was demoted to Kosong prefecture in 1629, but In 1638, the name change was reverted, and the region became Kosong County again.

=== Late Joseon period and Japanese occupation ===
In 1895, Korea went through a subdivision change that divided the whole Korean peninsula into 23 districts called bu (府, 부). This subdivision change put the Kosong County (along with Kansong County) under the district of Gangneungbu (named after its administrative capital Gangneung), and the County was subdivided into seven myeons: which were Dongmyeon (East myeon), Seomyeon (West myeon), Nammyeon (South myeon), Ilbukmyeon (North myeon no.1), Ibukmyeon (North myeon no.2), Anchangmyeon (安昌面) and Sudongmyeon (水洞面), In 1896, the provincial system were restored, and the counties were placed under Kangwon province again. After the Japanese occupied Korea, the whole of Kosong County was incorporated into the Kansong County (under Kōgen-dō), Dongmyeon and Anchangmyeon were merged into Kosongmyeon, Ilbukmyeon and Ibukmyeon were merged into Shinbukmyeon (新北面, New North myeon) and the administration of the regions formerly administered under Nammyeon were split between Sudongmyeon and Seomyeon, leading Kansong county to have 9 myeons under its administration (which were Toseongmyeon, Hyonnaemyeon, Gunnaemyeon, Jukwangmyeon, Odaemyeon, Sudongmyeon, Seomyeon, Shinbukmyeon and Kosongmyeon). In 1927, Kansong county was renamed as Kosong county, and Jukwangmyeon and Toseongmyeon was reorganized to be under the administration of Yangyang county, and Gunnaemyeon became Kansongmyeon. Around 1939, Shinbukmyeon was promoted to Jangjeonup (長箭邑) and most of the region of Jangjeonup was used to form Oegumgangmyeon (Outer Kumkang myeon) and the remaining regions of Jangjeonup (which were Jangjeonri and Songbukri) still formed Jangjeonup, and Odaemyeon was renamed Kojinmyeon.

=== Liberation of Korea and Post division ===
Prior to the end of the Korean War in 1953, it made up a single county under the control of North Korea, together with what is now the South Korean county of the same name. In a subdivision reorganization in 1952, the county absorbed Imnammyeon which originally formed the southern portion of Tongch'ŏn county.

== Physical features ==
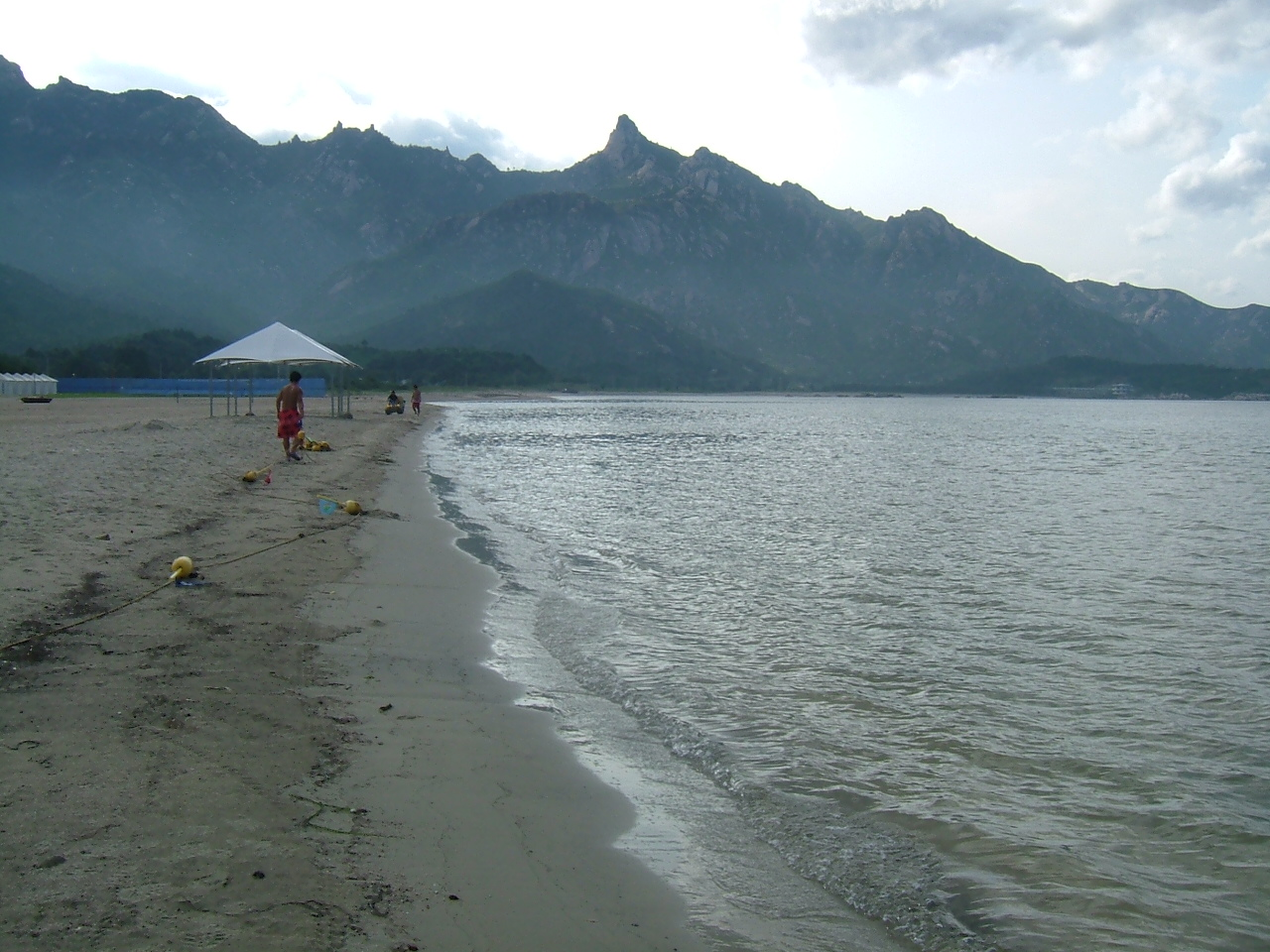
Kŭmgangsan beach.

Kosŏng's landscape is largely part of the Taebaek Mountains, but there is flat land along the coast of the Sea of Japan to the county's east. A portion of Kŭmgangsan mountain is included in the county.

== Climate ==
Climate data for Kosong station (Changjon) (1991–2020 normals, extremes 1976-present)
Month	Jan	Feb	Mar	Apr	May	Jun	Jul	Aug	Sep	Oct	Nov	Dec	Year
Record high °C (°F)	15.3 (59.5)	19.0 (66.2)	25.2 (77.4)	31.2 (88.2)	38.1 (100.6)	38.0 (100.4)	36.0 (96.8)	38.2 (100.8)	33.8 (92.8)	29.9 (85.8)	32.0 (89.6)	24.0 (75.2)	38.2 (100.8)
Mean daily maximum °C (°F)	3.9 (39.0)	5.2 (41.4)	10.0 (50.0)	16.4 (61.5)	21.3 (70.3)	24.2 (75.6)	26.8 (80.2)	27.4 (81.3)	23.9 (75.0)	19.4 (66.9)	12.6 (54.7)	6.2 (43.2)	16.4 (61.5)
Daily mean °C (°F)	−0.3 (31.5)	1.2 (34.2)	5.9 (42.6)	11.9 (53.4)	16.7 (62.1)	20.2 (68.4)	23.6 (74.5)	24.1 (75.4)	20.0 (68.0)	14.9 (58.8)	8.5 (47.3)	2.1 (35.8)	12.4 (54.3)
Mean daily minimum °C (°F)	−4.2 (24.4)	−2.7 (27.1)	1.7 (35.1)	7.1 (44.8)	12.1 (53.8)	16.6 (61.9)	20.6 (69.1)	21.1 (70.0)	16.4 (61.5)	10.8 (51.4)	4.3 (39.7)	−1.8 (28.8)	8.5 (47.3)
Record low °C (°F)	−19.5 (−3.1)	−18.8 (−1.8)	−14.0 (6.8)	−4.0 (24.8)	0.7 (33.3)	1.8 (35.2)	11.4 (52.5)	10.1 (50.2)	9.0 (48.2)	−1.0 (30.2)	−12.0 (10.4)	−15.0 (5.0)	−19.5 (−3.1)
Average precipitation mm (inches)	39.7 (1.56)	46.5 (1.83)	49.9 (1.96)	68.6 (2.70)	90.5 (3.56)	141.9 (5.59)	303.4 (11.94)	316.6 (12.46)	191.4 (7.54)	110.0 (4.33)	95.1 (3.74)	48.7 (1.92)	1,502.3 (59.15)
Average precipitation days (≥ 0.1 mm)	3.9	4.0	5.5	6.1	6.9	9.0	12.3	11.9	8.1	5.4	6.0	3.5	82.6
Average snowy days	3.7	3.5	3.2	0.2	0.1	0.0	0.0	0.0	0.0	0.0	0.3	1.8	12.8
Average relative humidity (%)	61.0	61.9	63.7	63.3	70.1	80.9	85.1	86.4	81.9	72.3	66.2	61.7	71.2
Source 1: Korea Meteorological Administration
Source 2: NOAA (extremes)

== Administrative divisions ==
Kosŏng county is divided into 1 ŭp (town) and 23 ri (villages):

=== Kosŏng-ŭp ===
Kosŏng-ŭp (高城邑,고성읍) is a town originally formed from Onjongri, Changdaeri, Yangjinri, and Yongyeri of Oegumgangmyeon in 1952. But in 1953, these original regions were later renamed as Onjongri and a region that was formerly called Jangjeonri was promoted to Kosongup. At that moment, part of Juhomri was incorporated into the town, and the whole village of Juhomri was eventually incorporated into the town in 1967. The region is known for its famous Mount Kumgang Tourist Region, along with the Kumgangsan Chongnyon Line.

=== Changp'o-ri ===
Changp'o-ri (장포리) is a village that was formed in 1952 from the villages Jangdori, Pohangri and Chuongri of the Oegumgangmyeon. The name is a combination of the first syllables of Jangdori and Pohangri. The region is known for its seaweed and sea cucumbers.

=== Ch'ogu-ri ===
Ch'ogu-ri (草邱里, 초구리) is a village named for its grassy mounds, which originally formed the subdivision of Anchangmyeon.

=== Haebang-ri ===
Haebangri (解放里, 해방리), named for it being one of the liberated towns of Kosong County by the partisans of Kosong during the Korean war. It was formed in 1952 from Youngjinri (then under Oegeumgangmyeon of Kosong County) and So a ri.

=== Haegŭmgang-ri ===
Haegŭmgang-ri is a village named after haegumgang.

=== Kobong-ri ===
Kobong-ri (고봉리) was first created in 1914. In 1949 part of Kobong-ri formed its own village called Taehung-ri, but it was reincorporated into Kohung-ri along with other villages in 1952.

=== Ryŏmsŏng-ri ===
Ryŏmsŏng-ri (濂城里,렴성리) was first created in 1952 from villages Naeryomsong-ri, Oeryomsong-ri, and Dongjawol-li (童子院里) which were originally under Rimnammyeon of Tongchon County. The village is named for its streams shaped like a castle.Ryomsong station is located here.

=== Sunhang-ri ===
Sunhang-ri (순학리) is a newly formed town in 1952 from Chohyonri of Sudongmyeon and Jeonseongri and Songtanri of Seomyeon. The village was named after Choi soon ak( Hero of the Republic winner), a soldier of the KPA, who fought in the Battle of Hill 351 during the Korean War.

=== Tup'o-ri ===
Tup'o-ri (두포리) is a village formed from merging Tupaek-ri and Jangryongpo-ri. There is an island called Solsom near the region.

=== Ungong-ri ===
Ungong-ri (雲谷里,운곡리) is a village formed from Naeun-ri, Oeun-ri, and Bangok-ri in 1914. The region was known for being cloudy historically.

=== Wŏlbisal-li ===
Wŏlbisal-li (月飛山里, 월비산리) is a village named after the mountain of Wolbisan. It is a newly created village that merged part of Sirang-ri and Pohyol-li (both under Seomyeon), and Jongwol-li (under Sudongmyeon). Parts of its regions were separated as a village called Yukyeok-ri, but was later reincorporated. The region is known for its honey.

== Economy ==
The local economy is dominated by agriculture, although fishing also plays a role, together with the harvesting of brown seaweed and clams. Significant local crops include rice, maize, soybeans, wheat, and barley. It is particularly well known as a source for bamboo handicrafts.

== Transport ==
Rail

Nearly half the length of the Kŭmgangsan Ch'ŏngnyŏn line of the Korean State Railway is in Kosŏng county. It is operational as far south as Kŭmgangsan Ch'ŏngnyŏn station. From there. the line continues south to Samilp'o and Kamho stations (both in North Korea, but not in regular use), then across the DMZ to connect to Korail's Tonghae Pukpu line at Jejin.

The section between Kŭmgangsan Ch'ŏngnyŏn and Jejin stations was out of service from the partition of Korea until 2007, when it was reopened for passenger trains from the South to the Mount Kŭmgang Tourist Region; it was closed again after the shooting of a South Korean tourist by a KPA soldier.

Sea

The nearest major port is Wŏnsan.

== See also ==
- Geography of North Korea
- Administrative divisions of North Korea
- Kumgangsan
