= Samilpo station =

Railway station in North Korea

Samilp'o 삼일포

Korean name
- Hangul: 삼일포
- Hanja: 三日浦驛
- Revised Romanization: Samilpo-yeok
- McCune–Reischauer: Samilp'o-yŏk

General information
- Location: Samilp'o-ri, Kosŏng, Kangwon Province; North Korea
- Coordinates: 38.6702°N 128.3222°E
- Owner: Korean State Railway
- Line: Kŭmgangsan Ch'ŏngnyŏn Line

History
- Opened: 1 November 1935
- Original company: Chosen Government Railway

Services
Preceding station	Korean State Railway	Following station
Kŭmgangsan Ch'ŏngnyŏn towards Anbyŏn	Kŭmgangsan Ch'ŏngnyŏn Line	Kamho towards Jejin (ROK)
Location

Samilp'o station is a railway station in Samilp'o-ri, Kosŏng county, Kangwŏn province, North Korea on the Kŭmgangsan Ch'ŏngnyŏn Line of the Korean State Railway.

== History ==
The station was opened on 1 November 1935 by the Chosen Government Railway, along with the rest of the sixth section of the original Tonghae Pukpu Line from Oegŭmgang (nowadays called Kŭmgangsan Ch'ŏngnyŏn) to Kansŏng (now in South Korea).
