= Penicillium raphiae =

Scientific classification
- Domain: Eukaryota
- Kingdom: Fungi
- Division: Ascomycota
- Class: Eurotiomycetes
- Order: Eurotiales
- Family: Aspergillaceae
- Genus: Penicillium
- Species: P. raphiae

Binomial name
- Penicillium raphiae Houbraken, Frisvad & Samson 2011

Type strain
- CBS 126234, DTO 78B8, IBT 22407

Species of fungus

Penicillium raphiae is a species of fungus in the genus Penicillium which was isolated from agricultural soil of the Ulleung Island in Korea.
