= Kamho station =

Railway station in North Korea

Kamho station 감호

Korean name
- Hangul: 감호역
- Hanja: 鑑湖驛
- Revised Romanization: Gamho-yeok
- McCune–Reischauer: Kamho-yŏk

General information
- Location: Kosŏng, Kangwon Province; North Korea
- Coordinates: 38.6400°N 128.3353°E
- Owner: Korean State Railway
- Line: Kŭmgangsan Ch'ŏngnyŏn Line

History
- Opened: 1 November 1935
- Original company: Chosen Government Railway

Services
| Preceding station | Korean State Railway | Following station |
|---|---|---|
| Samilp'o towards Anbyŏn | Kŭmgangsan Ch'ŏngnyŏn Line | Jejin (ROK) Terminus |
Location

Kamho station is a railway station in Kosŏng county, Kangwŏn province, North Korea on the Kŭmgangsan Ch'ŏngnyŏn Line of the Korean State Railway. Although the line continues across the DMZ to South Korea, that section is not presently in use and so Kamho station is the operational terminus of the line.

== History ==
The station was opened on 1 November 1935 by the Chosen Government Railway, along with the rest of the sixth section of the original Tonghae Pukpu Line from Oegŭmgang (nowadays called Kŭmgangsan Ch'ŏngnyŏn) to Kansŏng.
