= Tonghae station =

Railway station in North Korea

Tonghae 동해

Korean name
- Hangul: 동해역
- Hanja: 東海驛
- Revised Romanization: Donghae-yeok
- McCune–Reischauer: Tonghae-yŏk

General information
- Location: T'ongch'ŏn, Kangwŏn Province; North Korea
- Coordinates: 38.8987°N 127.9056°E
- Owner: Korean State Railway
- Line: Kŭmgangsan Ch'ŏngnyŏn Line

History
- Opened: 21 July 1931
- Former names: T'ongch'ŏn
- Original company: Chosen Government Railway

Services
Preceding station	Korean State Railway	Following station
T'ongch'ŏn towards Anbyŏn	Kŭmgangsan Ch'ŏngnyŏn Line	Ryŏmsŏng towards Jejin (ROK)
Location

Tonghae station is a railway station in T'ongch'ŏn county, Kangwŏn province, North Korea on the Kŭmgangsan Ch'ŏngnyŏn Line of the Korean State Railway.

== History ==
The station, originally called T'ongch'ŏn station was opened on 21 July 1931 by the Chosen Government Railway, along with the rest of the second section of the original Tonghae Pukpu Line from Hŭpkok (nowadays Myŏnggo) to T'ongch'ŏn (nowadays Tonghae).
