= Ri Yong-ho (general) =

North Korean general (1942–c. 2012)

- Born: 5 October 1942; Tongchon, Kōgen-dō, Korea, Empire of Japan
- Died: c. July 2012 (aged 69); North Korea
- Military career
- Allegiance: North Korea
- Branch: Korean People's Army Ground Force
- Service years: 1959-2012
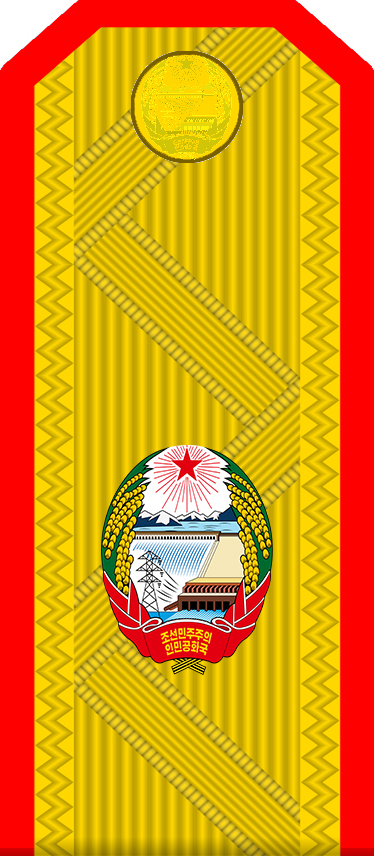
- Rank: Ch'asu (Vice Marshal)
- Conflicts: Bombardment of Yeonpyeong

Korean name
- Hangul: 리영호
- Hanja: 李英浩
- RR: Ri Yeongho
- MR: Ri Yŏngho

Vice Marshal Ri Yong-ho (Korean: 리영호; 5 October 1942 – c. July 2012) was a North Korean military officer who was Chief of the General Staff of the Korean People's Army from 2009 to 2012, as well as a member of the Presidium of the Workers' Party of Korea from September 2010 to July 2012.

== Early life and education ==
Ri was born on 5 October 1942 in Tongchon County, Kōgen-dō, Korea, Empire of Japan (now in Kangwon Province, North Korea). He joined the Korean People's Army (KPA) in August 1959. He graduated from the Kim Il Sung Military University.

== Career ==
After graduation, Ri Yong-ho worked as chief of staff of a division, director of the operations department of an army corps, head of a training center, vice-director of the operations department of the general staff, its deputy chief and head of a training center of the KPA. He was promoted to lieutenant general in 2002, and served as commander of the Pyongyang Defense Command from 2003-09. He became a rising star in 2003 as a result of his appointment as the head of the military unit guarding the capital city and the Kim family.

He was appointed Chief of the General Staff of the KPA in February 2009. He was elected a member of the Presidium of the Politburo of the Central Committee of the Workers' Party of Korea as well as vice-chairman of the Central Military Commission at the Party Conference held on 28 September 2010. He was also promoted to Vice Marshal immediately before the Conference. Afterwards, he appeared jointly with Kim Jong Il on several occasions, and he gave the keynote speech during the military parade in October celebrating the WPK's 65th anniversary. In December 2011, he and leader and successor Kim Jong Un led the funeral procession through the streets of Pyongyang after the death of Kim Jong Il. Ri led a parade on 25 April 2012, marking the 80th anniversary of the foundation of the North Korean military.

== Dismissal and reported death ==
On 16 July 2012, North Korean state media reported Ri Yong-ho had been relieved of all his Party duties, namely his Presidium Committee membership, Politburo membership, and Party Central Military Commission vice-chairmanship, stating this move was due to unspecified illness. A spokesman for the South Korean Ministry of Unification said the move was "very unusual". The meeting at which his removal was announced was attended by the entire Presidium, Politburo members and candidate members, making ill health seem implausibly minor.

Ri was replaced by Hyon Yong-chol in the role of the Chief of the General Staff. On 20 July 2012, unconfirmed reports alleged that Ri had died or been injured in a firefight with Political Bureau troops. In November 2012, the South Korean media reported that Ri was believed to be under house arrest. A 2015 report stated that Ri Yong-ho had been executed in 2012. Some reports suggest that this may mark a shift and reshuffle in power between the political leadership and the armed forces from former Military First policy, with the political leadership in the ascendant.

== Awards and honors ==
A picture of Ri shows Ri wearing the ribbons to all the decorations awarded to him.

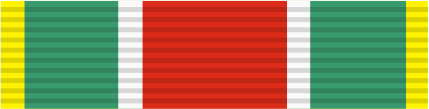

Military offices
Preceded by Kim Kyok-sik	Chief of the General Staff of the Korean People's Army; 2009 – 2012	Succeeded by Hyon Yong-chol
Party political offices
New title	Vice Chairman of the Central Military Commission of the Workers' Party of Korea; 2010 – 2012; Served alongside: Kim Jong Un (2010–2012); Choe Ryong-hae (2012)	Succeeded by Choe Ryong-hae; Hyon Yong-chol
