= List of volcanoes in Korea =

This is a list of active and extinct volcanoes in Korea.

| Name | Elevation | | Location | Last eruption |
| Name | meters | feet | Coordinates | Last eruption |
|---|---|---|---|---|
| Baekdu Mountain (백두산/白頭山) | 2744 | 9003 | 41.98°N 128.08°E | 1903 |
| Ch'uga-ryong (추가령/楸哥嶺) | 452 | 1483 | 38.33°N 127.33°E | Holocene |
| Hallasan (한라산/漢拏山) | 1950 | 6396 | 33.37°N 126.53°E | 1007 |
| Ulleungdo (울릉도/鬱陵島) | 984 | 3228 | 37.50°N 130.87°E | 2990 BC |

== Description ==
There are no active volcanoes in Korea. North Korea and South Korea have two volcanoes at the moment. Backdu mountain is located in Ryanggang Province and Ch'uga-ryong is located in Anbyon County, Kangwon Province, North Korea. Hallasan is located in Jeju Province and Ulleungdo is located in North Gyeongsang Province.
