= Silene takeshimensis =

Scientific classification
- Kingdom: Plantae
- Clade: Embryophytes
- Clade: Tracheophytes
- Clade: Spermatophytes
- Clade: Angiosperms
- Clade: Eudicots
- Order: Caryophyllales
- Family: Caryophyllaceae
- Genus: Silene
- Species: S. takeshimensis

Binomial name
- Silene takeshimensis Uyeki ＆ Sakata(1935)

Species of plant

Silene takeshimensis (Korean: 울릉장구채, Japanese:タケシママンテマ), also known as the Ulleung catchfly, is a flower that is native to Ulleungdo and is found between rocks.

== Description ==
Flowers bloom from June to August and it grows up from 20 cms to 50 cms. It has lanceolate leaves and the leaves in the middle are usually the length of around 6 to 9 cms and width is around 7 to 10 mms.
