= Nari Basin =

Nari Basin

Nari Basin is a basin in Ulleungdo, South Korea, and is just under Seonginbong. The Nari basin is made by Seonginbong’s past volcanic activity and is a caldera. Thousands of years ago, there was a huge volcanic activity in Seonginbong and after that, the underneath part subsided and the Nari basin was formed. The Seonginbong is now an inactive volcano and these days, people live in the basin and grow crops.

== The origin of the name ==
People lived in the basin since the Usan-guk era. But in the Joseon dynasty, King Taejong announced a policy to the people who had lived there to empty the Ulleungdo. About 450 years later, when King Gojong held sway over Joseon, the island was cultivated again. The name ‘Nari’ was called as it is because the people who lived in the basin a long time ago prolonged their lives by digging up the roots of the plant ‘seommalnari (Ulleungdo turk’s-cap lily, Lilium hansonii)’. As people have named the basin in Chinese characters : 羅里 by recognizing the basin as ‘a beautiful village like silk’, but the ‘nari’s are still growing a lot in the basin area. Around 500 people (93 houses) lived in the Nari-dong(village) when it was cultivated again in the late 1800s.

== General information ==
The basin has a cover area of 1.5-2.0 square kilometers, about 1.5 km from east to west, and about 2.0 km from south to north. Nari basin is a crater basin formed by the collapse of the northern part of Seonginbong(984m)'s caldera, within the eruption of Albong(611m) and the lava from Albong separated into two crater basins. The northeastern part is called the Nari village and the southwestern part is called Albong village where no people live in. The Basin is surrounded by somma, and the Seonginbong is the highest peak of the somma and also the highest peak of Ulleungdo.

The Tumakjip houses in Nari are built with Ulleungdo hemlock (Tsuga diversifolia) and Engler’s beech (Fagus engleriana), shaping them in a hash sign with soil attached in between. The Gyeongbuk province designated 4 Tumakjip houses in Nari to be protected as cultural assets.

== Tourist attractions ==
Famous tourists attractions in Nari basin : shingle-roofed houses, Tumakjip houses, Sillyeongsu saengtae-gil(road), Albong, Ulleungdo thyme (Thymus quinquecostatus) Habitat, Yongchulso, Sinryeongsu,

Natural monument in Nari basin : Ulleung dendranthema (Dendranthema zawadskii)
