= Taehanjiji =

1899 Korean geography text

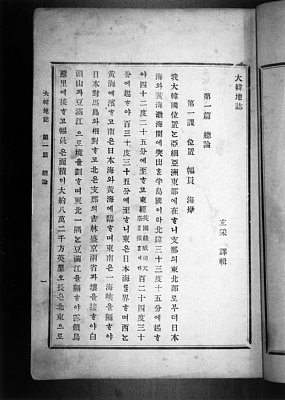
A page from Taehanjiji

Taehanjiji (Korean: 대한지지; Hanja: 大韓地誌) is an elementary school geography text about the Korean Empire by Hyŏn Ch'ae. Hyŏn Ch'ae wrote the book in 1899, translating and compiling Japanese and Korean sources. It was published by the company Kwangmunsa.

Taehanjiji was first published in 1899 and reprinted in 1901. It gave a summary description of late 19th century Korean geography with greater emphasis on physical geography. The written language conformed to the then innovative Gukhanmun Honyongche, one combining han'geul and hanja, and was popular for the relative ease of deciphering.

The titles, authors, and chronologies of source material for the compilation are not always stated, yet Gomatsu Susumu(小松運)'s Chōsenhachidō-shi(朝鮮八道誌; Joseon Paldo-ji, 1887) and Matsumoto Nikichi(Kendo)(松本仁吉; a.k.a. 謙堂)'s Chōsenchishi Yoryaku (朝鮮地誌要略; Joseon Jiji Yoryak, 1894) and their styles are suspected as primary sources and models for emulation.

The author states in the epilogue that he employed several Japanese geographies on Korea, and that he supplemented these with the historical sections from Shinjeung Dongguk Yeojiseungram.

As the first Western-style geography textbook published in late Joseon dynasty, it was part of the Gaehwa policy, the opening up to enlightenment for the Korean masses and raising awareness and unity as a nation by inviting commoners to learn everything they could about the Korean Empire and its landscape, namely the Korean Peninsula at late 19th century. Lee Gyu-hwan (Korean: 이규환; Hanja: 李圭桓), Director of Editorial Office, Ministry of Education, wrote the foreword. Taehanjiji was employed in the school system, but was banned, confiscated, and burned by Protectorate General by Notice No. 72 of Nov. 19, 1910.

== Related works ==
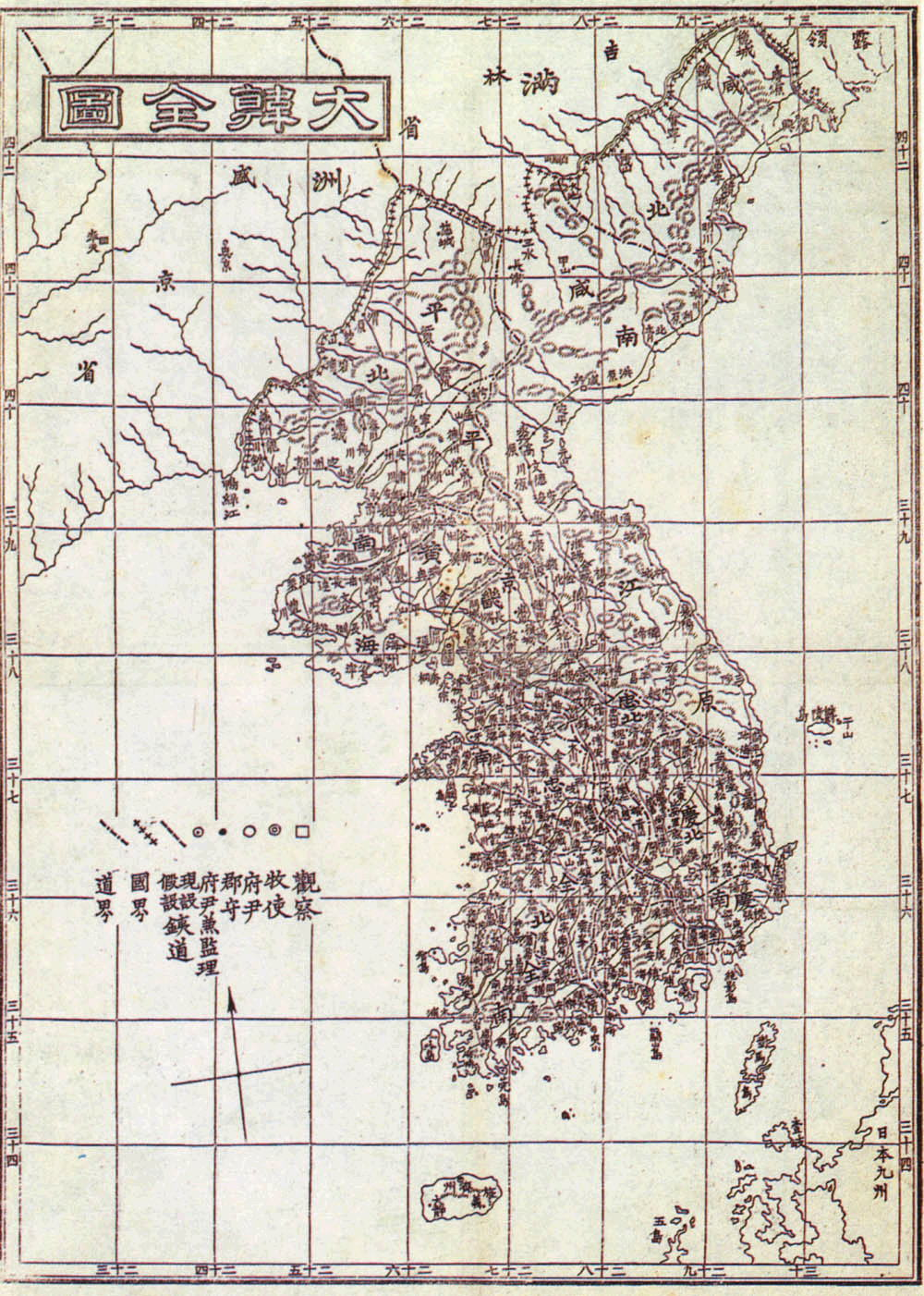
The map of Taehanjiji

Taehanjiji was the last of the three geographical works of the late 1900s. The provincial gazetteers that were written from 1871 onward, Joseon Jiji (朝鮮地誌; 1895, 1 vol.), and Dahanjiji itself. Its reprinting in 1901 was followed by other geographical works by authors who were inspired by its novelty, yet who were disappointed by its brevity and obvious omissions. Thus were published Daehan Shinjiji (大韓新地志, Jang Jiyeon, 1907), Chodeung Dahanjiji (初等大韓地誌, An Jonghwa, 1907), and again Chodeung Dahanjiji (初等大韓地誌 An Jonghwa, Ryun Yeon, 1908), which described the island Usando as lying to the Southeast of Ulleungdo. As for institutional innovations in the local administrations since the Japanese invasions (1592–1598), down to 1904, the 1908 Jeungbo Munheon Bigo, The Expanded Encyclopedia of the Eastern Nation, succinctly noted the redevelopment of Ulleung Island of 1883, its promotion to Uldo County of 1900, and the incorporation of Usan Island under Uldo County jurisdiction.

== Geographical claims ==
Taehanjiji describes the domain of the Great Korean Empire as stretching from 33°15′N to 42°25′N and from 124°30′E to 130°35′E, which would exclude the Liancourt Rocks (located at 37°14′30″N 131°52′0″E), ownership of which is claimed by both Korea and Japan.

Although Taehanjiji garnered praise as a pioneering Western-style textbook in late Joseon dynasty, it was criticized for its overt dependence on Japanese geographies. It had borrowed heavily from the Japanese sources in its overview, format, and content material, and its longitude-latitude co-ordinates were literally translated from the Japanese books rather than taking Korean measurements conducted by the Korean government. The so-called four limits of the Korean peninsula, including the eastern limit ~~ that have drawn heavy criticism, have been identified in such prior Japanese geographies as follows.

- Kan’ei Suiroshi, first and second editions(寰瀛水路誌; 海軍水路部 嘉納謙作, 1883, 1886)
- Chōsenhachidō-shi(朝鮮八道誌, 小松運, 1887)
- Shinsen Chōsenkoku Chizu(新撰朝鮮国地図, 林正, 1894.7),
- Shinsen Chōsen Chiri-shi(新撰朝鮮地理誌, 大田才次郎, 1894)
- Chōsen Suiroshi(朝鮮水路誌, 海軍水路寮, 1894.11)
