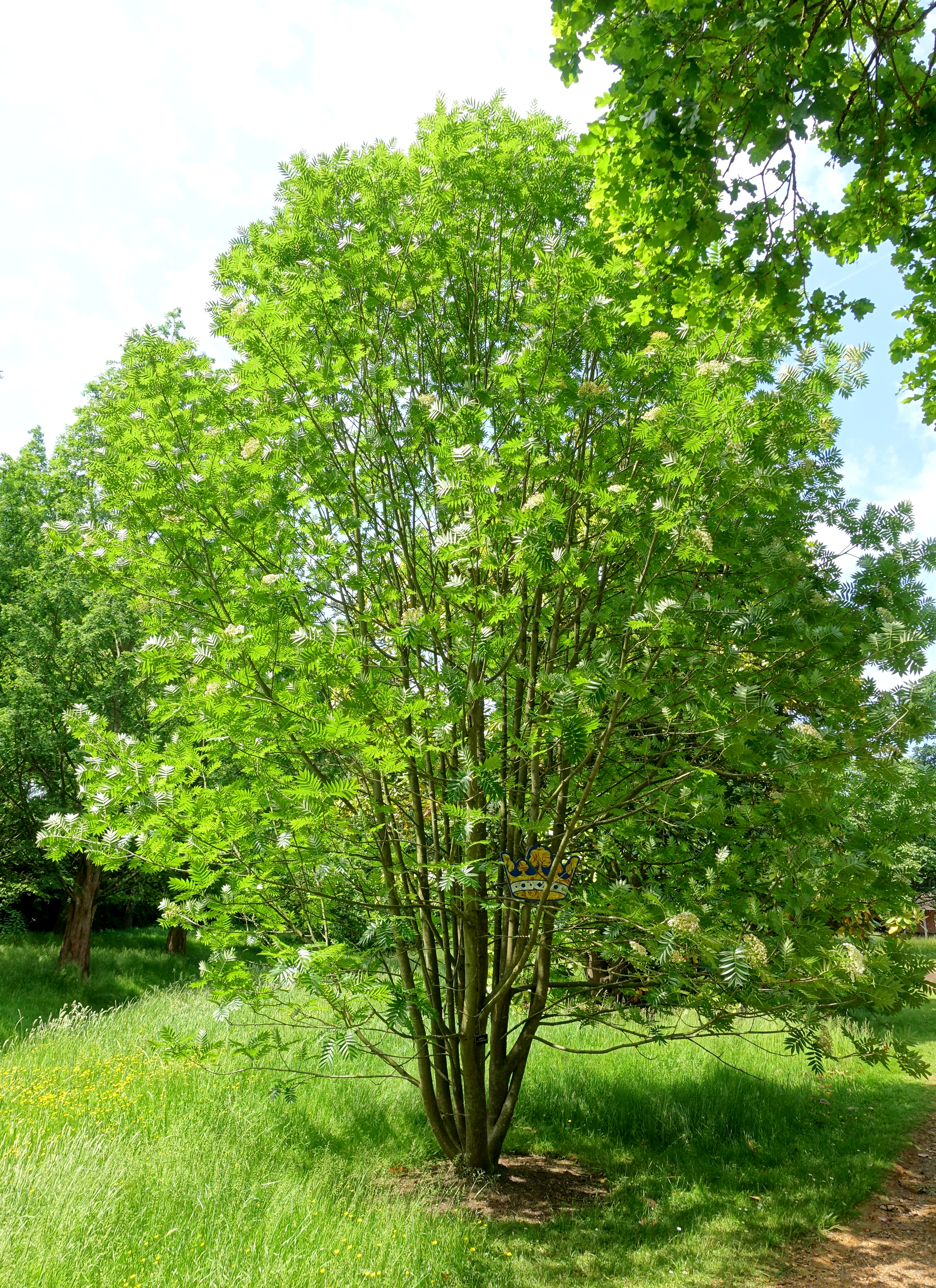

Scientific classification
- Kingdom: Plantae
- Clade: Embryophytes
- Clade: Tracheophytes
- Clade: Spermatophytes
- Clade: Angiosperms
- Clade: Eudicots
- Clade: Rosids
- Order: Rosales
- Family: Rosaceae
- Genus: Sorbus
- Species: S. ulleungensis

Binomial name
- Sorbus ulleungensis Chin S.Chang

Synonyms
- Pyrus ulleungensis (Chin S.Chang) M.F.Fay & Christenh.; Sorbus commixta var. ulleungensis (Chin S.Chang) M.Kim

= Sorbus ulleungensis =

Species of flowering plant

Sorbus ulleungensis is a species of rowan native to Ulleung Island of South Korea. Its cultivar 'Olympic Flame' has gained the Royal Horticultural Society's Award of Garden Merit as an ornamental. This medium-sized upright tree, growing to 8 m (26 ft), has large leaves which turn brilliant shades of red and orange in Autumn. Small white flowers in Spring are followed by bright red berries in the Autumn.
