= Seonginbong =

Mountain in South Korea

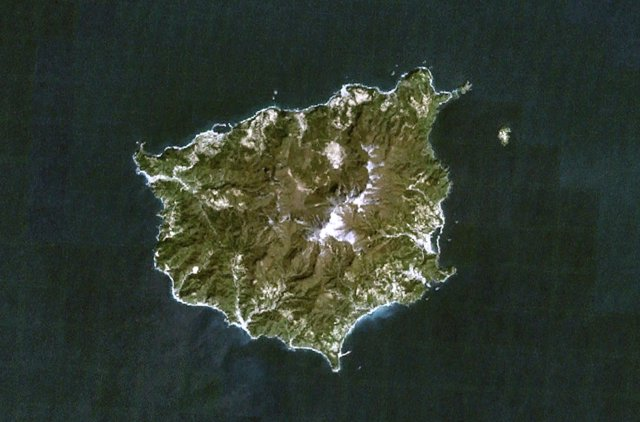
- NASA Landsat7 image of Seonginbong and Ulleung-do (north oriented at top)

Highest point
- Elevation: 984 m (3,228 ft)
- Prominence: 984 m (3,228 ft)
- Coordinates: 37°30′12″N 130°51′58″E

Geography
- Location: Ulleung County, North Gyeongsang, South Korea

Geology
- Mountain type: Stratovolcano
- Last eruption: 2990 BCE ± 40 years

Korean name
- Hangul: 성인봉
- RR: Seonginbong
- MR: Sŏnginbong

Seonginbong (Korean: 성인봉) is a mountain located on the South Korean island of Ulleungdo, in North Gyeongsang Province, off the eastern coast of the mainland Korean Peninsula. It is the tallest mountain on the island and has an elevation of 984 metres.

== See also ==
- List of mountains of Korea
