= Kumgangsan Chongnyon station =

Railway station in Kosong County, North Korea

Kŭmgangsan Ch'ŏngnyŏn 금강산청년

Korean name
- Hangul: 금강산청년역
- Hanja: 金剛山青年驛
- Revised Romanization: Geumgangsan Cheongnyeon-yeok
- McCune–Reischauer: Kŭmgangsan Ch'ŏngnyŏn-yŏk

General information
- Location: Kosŏng, Kangwŏn Province; North Korea
- Coordinates: 38.6915°N 128.2162°E
- Owner: Korean State Railway
- Line: Kŭmgangsan Ch'ŏngnyŏn Line

History
- Opened: 16 September 1932
- Former names: Oegŭmgang
- Original company: Chosen Government Railway

Services
Preceding station	Korean State Railway	Following station
Kosŏng towards Anbyŏn	Kŭmgangsan Ch'ŏngnyŏn Line	Samilp'o towards Jejin (ROK)
Location

Kŭmgangsan Ch'ŏngnyŏn station is a railway station in Kosŏng county, Kangwŏn province, North Korea on the Kŭmgangsan Ch'ŏngnyŏn Line of the Korean State Railway.

== History ==
The station, originally called Oegŭmgang station, was opened on 16 September 1932 by the Chosen Government Railway, along with the rest of the fifth section of the original Tonghae Pukpu Line from Changjŏn to Oegŭmgang (nowadays called Kŭmgangsan Ch'ŏngnyŏn).

== Services ==
Due to the partition of Korea, Kŭmgangsan Ch'ŏngnyŏn station is the terminus for domestic passenger trains operating on the line. In 2007, after the reconstruction of the disused section between Kamho and Chejin in the South, passenger trains began operating from the south to bring southern tourists to the Mount Kŭmgang Tourist Region. More than one million civilian visitors crossed the DMZ until the route was closed following the shooting death of a 53-year-old South Korean tourist in July 2008.
