= Kōgen Province =

1910–1945 province of Korea under Japan

Kōgen Province 江原道
- Former province of Korea, Empire of Japan
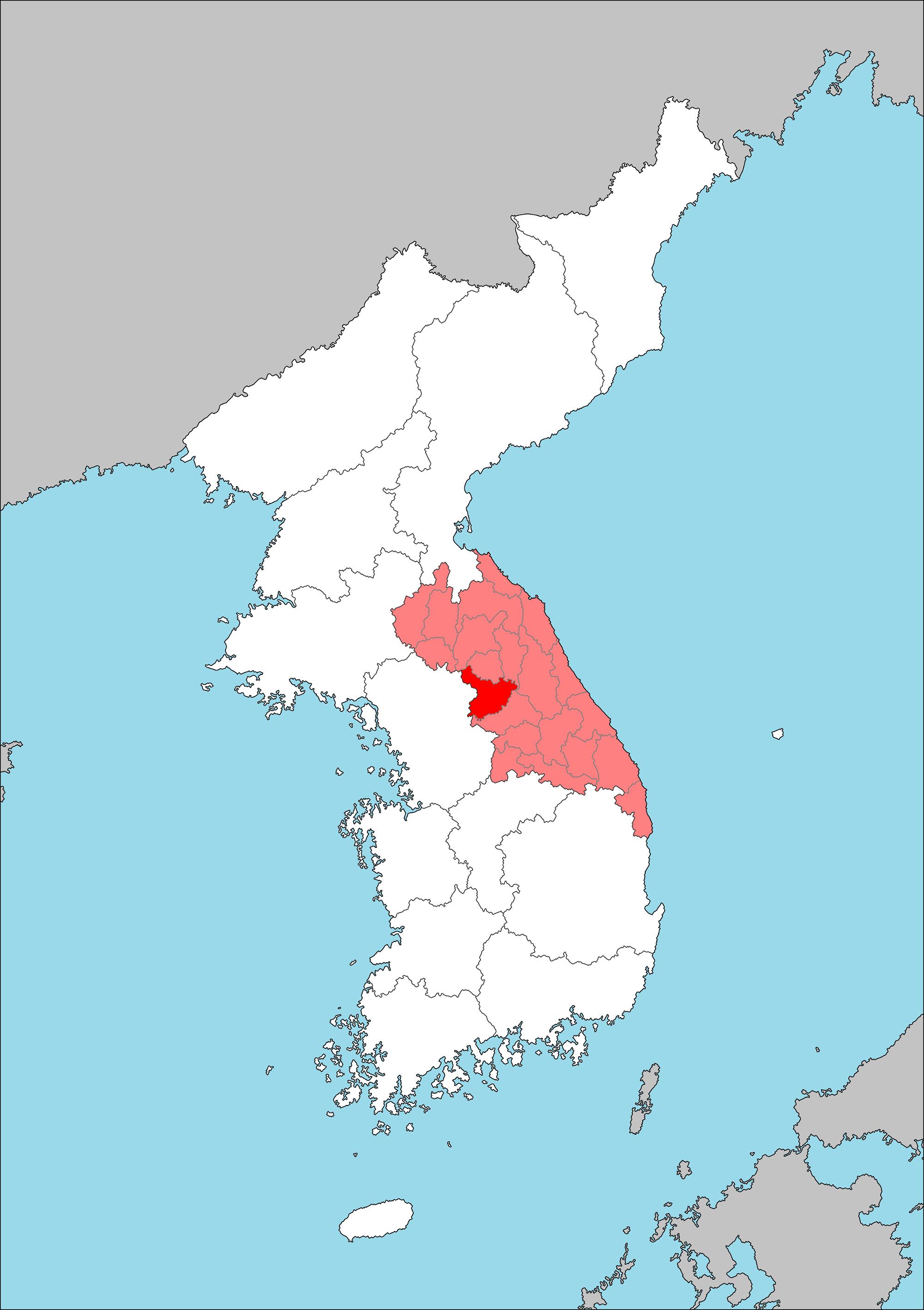
- Capital: Shunsen
- History
  - Established: 29 August 1910
  - Disestablished: 15 August 1945
- Today part of: South Korea; North Korea

Kōgen-dō (江原道, Korean: 강원도), alternatively Kōgen Province, was a province of Korea under Japanese rule. Its capital was Shunsen (Chuncheon). The province corresponds to the combination of the modern Kangwon Province, North Korea and Gangwon Province, South Korea. (Note: Due to the division of Korea, while each Korea has its own Kangwon/Gangwon Province, the North Korean portion of Gyeonggi and the South Korean portion of Hwanghae have been absorbed into other provinces. Shunsen is now the South Korean city of Chuncheon.)

== Population ==
Year	Population
1925	1,322,331
1930	1,473,972
1940	1,742,928
1944	1,836,661

Number of people by nationality according to the 1936 census:

- Overall population: 1,529,071 people
  - Japanese: 15,019 people
  - Koreans: 1,513,276 people
  - Other: 776 people

== Administrative divisions ==
The following list is based on the administrative divisions of 1945:

=== Counties ===
- Shunsen (春川) - (capital): Chuncheon (춘천).
- Rintei (麟蹄): Inje (인제).
- Yōkō (楊口): Yanggu (양구).
- Waiyō (淮陽): Hoeyang (회양).
- Tsūsen (通川): Tongcheon (통천).
- Kōjō (高城): Goseong (고성).
- Jōyō (襄陽): Yangyang (양양).
- Kōryō (江陵): Gangneung (강릉).
- Sanchoku (三陟): Samcheok (삼척).
- Utchin (蔚珍): Uljin (울진). present Uljin County in North Gyeongsang Province.
- Seizen (旌善): Jeongseon (정선).
- Heishō (平昌): Pyeongchang (평창).
- Neietsu (寧越): Yeongwol (영월).
- Genshū (原州): Wonju (원주).
- Ōjō (橫城): Hoengseong (횡성).
- Kōsen (洪川): Hongcheon (홍천).
- Kasen (華川): Hwacheon (화천).
- Kinka (金化): Gimhwa (김화).
- Tetsugen (鐵原): Cheorwon (철원).
- Heikō (平康): Pyeonggang (평강).
- Isen (伊川): Icheon (이천).

== Provincial governors ==
The following people were provincial ministers before August 1919. This was then changed to the title of governor.

Nationality	Name	Name in kanji/hanja	Start of tenure	End of tenure	Notes
Korean	Lee Kyu-wan	李 圭完	October 1, 1910	September 23, 1918	Provincial minister
Korean	Won Eung-sang	元 應常	September 23, 1918	August 5, 1921	Provincial minister before August 1919
Korean	Sin Seok-rin	申 錫麟	August 5, 1921	February 26, 1923	
Korean	Yoon Kab-byeong	尹 甲炳	February 26, 1923	December 1, 1924	
Korean	Park Yeong-cheol	朴 栄喆	December 1, 1924	August 14, 1926	
Korean	Park Sang-jun	朴 相駿	August 14, 1926	May 18, 1927	
Korean	Yoo Seong-jun	兪 星濬	May 18, 1927	November 28, 1929	
Korean	Lee Beom-ik	李 範益	November 28, 1929	April 1, 1935	
Korean	Son Yeong-mok	孫 永穆	April 1, 1935	April 1, 1937	
Korean	Kim Shi-kwon	金 時権	April 1, 1937	May 17, 1939	
Korean	Yoon Tae-bin	尹 泰彬	May 17, 1939	September 2, 1940	
Japanese	Takao Jinzō	高尾 甚造	September 2, 1940	November 19, 1941	
Japanese	Yagyū Shigeo	柳生 繁雄	November 19, 1941	December 1, 1943	
Korean	Nakahara Kōjun	中原 鴻洵	December 1, 1943	June 16, 1945	Had been forced to change name from Yoo Hong-sun (劉鴻洵)
Korean	Son Yeong-mok	孫 永穆	June 16, 1945	August 15, 1945	Korean independence

== See also ==
- Provinces of Korea
- Governor-General of Chōsen
- Administrative divisions of Korea
- Gangwon (historical province)
- Gangwon Province (South Korea)
- Kangwon Province (North Korea)
