= Anbyon Field =

Wetland in North Korea

Coordinates: 39°03′00″N 127°31′00″E

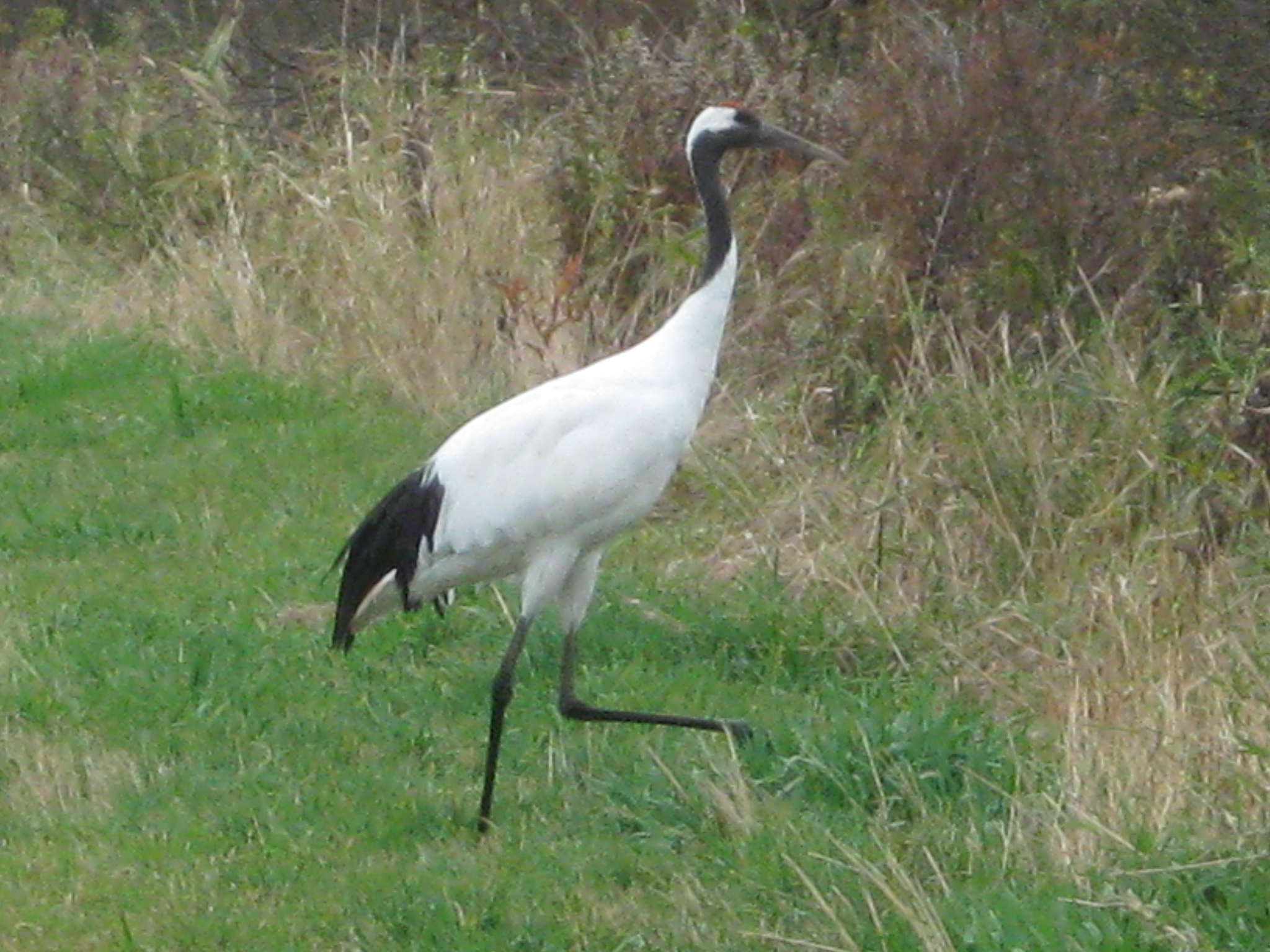
The site is important for red-crowned cranes

Anbyon Field is a 1,000-hectare (2,500-acre) wetland site in Kangwon Province of North Korea. It is one of the state's designated Natural Monuments and has been identified by BirdLife International as an Important Bird Area (IBA) because it supports a population of endangered red-crowned cranes.
