= Ulleung County =

County in North Gyeongsang, South Korea

Coordinates: 37°29′00″N 130°54′00″E

Ulleung
- County
- Flag Emblem of Ulleung

- Location in South Korea
- Country: South Korea
- Region: Yeongnam
- Province: North Gyeongsang Province
- Administrative divisions: 1 eup, 2 myeon

Area
  - Total: 72.518 km^{2} (27.999 sq mi)

Population (September 2024)
  - Total: 9,169
  - Density: 143.8/km^{2} (372/sq mi)
  - Dialect: Gyeongsang
- Area code: +82-54-790~799

Korean name
- Hangul: 울릉군
- Hanja: 鬱陵郡
- RR: Ulleung-gun
- MR: Ullŭng-gun

Ulleung County (Korean: 울릉군) is a county in North Gyeongsang Province, South Korea.

Ulleung County has a population of 10,426 making it the least populated county in South Korea. Ulleung County consists mainly of the island of Ulleungdo and 44 smaller islands located in the East Sea, including the Liancourt Rocks (Dokdo) in the effective governance of South Korea but claimed by Japan. Ulleung County is administratively divided into one eup and two myeon: Ulleung-eup, Buk-myeon, and Seo-myeon, which are divided into 10 legal ri, those into 25 administrative ri, and at the most basic level the county is held to contain 56 "natural villages."

== History ==
At the year of 512, Jijeung of Silla conquered Usan-guk which was the original nation in Ulleung-do. After a downfall of Silla, Goryeo naturally took the title of Ulleung. In 930, 13th year of Taejo of Goryeo, he granted local people bringing a tribute.

Hyeonjong of Goryeo sent his ambassador to islands for recovering ruined farming land in 1012.

== Location ==
It is located in the middle of the East Sea between the Korean Peninsula and Japan. There are two main ports that provide ferries to Ulleung and Liancourt Rocks (Dokdo): Pohang Port and Mukho Port. These two ports offer regular shipping service.

== Administrative divisions ==
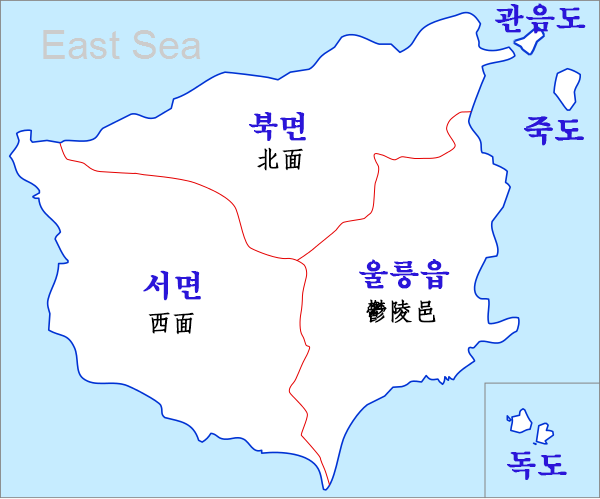
Ulleung eup and myeon map in Korean

Ulleung-gun is divided into one eup and two myeon. Ulleung-eup is then divided into four legal ri, but six administrative ri. Buk-myeon is divided into three legal ri, eight administrative ri. Seo-myeon is divided into three legal ri, five administrative ri.

eup and myeon	Hangeul	Hanja	ri	Hangeul	Hanja
Ulleung-eup	울릉읍	鬱陵邑	Dodong-ri: Dodong 1-ri; Dodong 2-ri; Dodong 3-ri	도동리: 도동1리; 도동2리; 도동3리	道洞里: 道洞一里; 道洞二里; 道洞三里
Ulleung-eup	울릉읍	鬱陵邑	Jeodong-ri	저동리	苧洞里
Ulleung-eup	울릉읍	鬱陵邑	Sadong-ri	사동리	沙洞里
Ulleung-eup	울릉읍	鬱陵邑	Dokdo-ri	독도리	獨島里
Buk-myeon	북면	北面	Cheonbu-ri: Cheonbu 1-ri; Cheonbu 2-ri; Cheonbu 3-ri; Cheonbu 4-ri	천부리: 천부1리; 천부2리; 천부3리; 천부4리	天府里: 天府一里; 天府二里; 天府三里; 天府四里
Buk-myeon	북면	北面	Na-ri: Na-ri; Nari 1-ri; Nari 2-ri	나리: 나리; 나리1리; 나리2리	羅里: 羅里; 羅里一里; 羅里二里
Buk-myeon	북면	北面	Hyeonpo-ri	현포리	玄圃里
Seo-myeon	서면	西面	Namyang: Namyang 1-ri; Namyang 2-ri; Namyang 3-ri	남양리: 남양1리; 남양2리; 남양3리	南陽里: 南陽一里; 南陽二里; 南陽三里
Seo-myeon	서면	西面	Namseo-ri	남서리	南西里
Seo-myeon	서면	西面	Taeha-ri	태하리	台霞里

== Snowflower Festival ==
Ulleung County, which has one of the highest snowfalls in all of Korea, hosts the Snowflower Festival. In 2007, Ulleung had a lot of snow, up to 42 cm (16.5 in) around coastlines and 105 cm (around 3 ft 5in) in the Nari Basin. But the county did not host its festival before 2006 as there was not enough snow.

== Symbols ==
- Tree: Machilus thunbergii
- Flower: camellia flower
- Bird: wood pigeon

== Climate ==
Ulleung has a cooler version of a humid subtropical climate (Köppen: Cfa) with very warm, rainy, muggy summers and cold, snowy winters.

Climate data for Ulleung (1991–2020 normals, extremes 1938–present)
Month	Jan	Feb	Mar	Apr	May	Jun	Jul	Aug	Sep	Oct	Nov	Dec	Year
Record high °C (°F)	15.3 (59.5)	19.2 (66.6)	21.8 (71.2)	26.1 (79.0)	30.8 (87.4)	32.2 (90.0)	34.6 (94.3)	35.4 (95.7)	32.4 (90.3)	27.2 (81.0)	24.5 (76.1)	18.6 (65.5)	35.4 (95.7)
Mean daily maximum °C (°F)	4.4 (39.9)	5.6 (42.1)	9.6 (49.3)	15.1 (59.2)	19.7 (67.5)	22.5 (72.5)	25.5 (77.9)	26.9 (80.4)	23.2 (73.8)	18.8 (65.8)	13.2 (55.8)	7.2 (45.0)	16.0 (60.8)
Daily mean °C (°F)	1.7 (35.1)	2.5 (36.5)	5.8 (42.4)	11.1 (52.0)	15.8 (60.4)	19.1 (66.4)	22.7 (72.9)	23.8 (74.8)	20.0 (68.0)	15.4 (59.7)	9.9 (49.8)	4.3 (39.7)	12.7 (54.9)
Mean daily minimum °C (°F)	−0.5 (31.1)	0.0 (32.0)	2.9 (37.2)	7.8 (46.0)	12.5 (54.5)	16.5 (61.7)	20.5 (68.9)	21.7 (71.1)	17.7 (63.9)	13.0 (55.4)	7.4 (45.3)	1.9 (35.4)	10.1 (50.2)
Record low °C (°F)	−11.6 (11.1)	−13.6 (7.5)	−9.9 (14.2)	−2.7 (27.1)	3.8 (38.8)	7.8 (46.0)	12.5 (54.5)	14.7 (58.5)	8.9 (48.0)	0.7 (33.3)	−5.9 (21.4)	−9.6 (14.7)	−13.6 (7.5)
Average precipitation mm (inches)	117.4 (4.62)	91.3 (3.59)	76.4 (3.01)	97.8 (3.85)	108.5 (4.27)	116.8 (4.60)	175.0 (6.89)	176.7 (6.96)	173.6 (6.83)	100.9 (3.97)	116.9 (4.60)	129.3 (5.09)	1,480.6 (58.29)
Average precipitation days (≥ 0.1 mm)	18.8	14.5	12.0	9.0	8.6	8.6	12.0	11.6	10.6	9.3	13.1	18.2	146.3
Average snowy days	17.7	13.2	7.4	1.0	0.0	0.0	0.0	0.0	0.0	0.1	3.4	13.1	55.9
Average relative humidity (%)	68.6	68.4	67.5	67.2	70.2	79.6	84.7	83.4	79.3	71.4	67.6	67.3	72.9
Mean monthly sunshine hours	102.0	118.1	180.5	216.5	238.5	185.5	165.1	176.6	163.7	178.8	132.0	104.1	1,961.4
Percentage possible sunshine	29.5	34.2	45.1	53.7	51.7	39.7	33.6	38.8	42.5	50.7	42.6	33.7	41.7
Source: Korea Meteorological Administration (percent sunshine 1981–2010)

== Tourism ==
=== Tourist spots ===
Places recommended by Gyeongsangbuk-do Culture & Tourism Organization

Gwaneumdo
Dokdo Island
Dokdo mit haedojigwangwang cablecar
Bongnae Falls
Jukdo Island
Taehahyangmok Tourist Monorail

=== Airport ===
Ulleung Airport is currently under construction and estimated to open in 2027. The 1200m runway is being built on reclaimed land in the south part of the island. As of November 2025, there are discussions about whether the runway will be sufficiently long enough to accommodate 80 passenger planes. The airport will allow for more tourists to visit the island, as travel time from Seoul and other origins will be shortened significantly.

== Twin towns and sister cities ==
Ulleung is twinned with:

- Anyang, South Korea
- Pohang, South Korea
- Suyeong-gu, South Korea
- Samcheok, South Korea
