= Goseong County, Gangwon =

Coordinates: 38°22′51″N 128°28′11″E

Goseong
- County
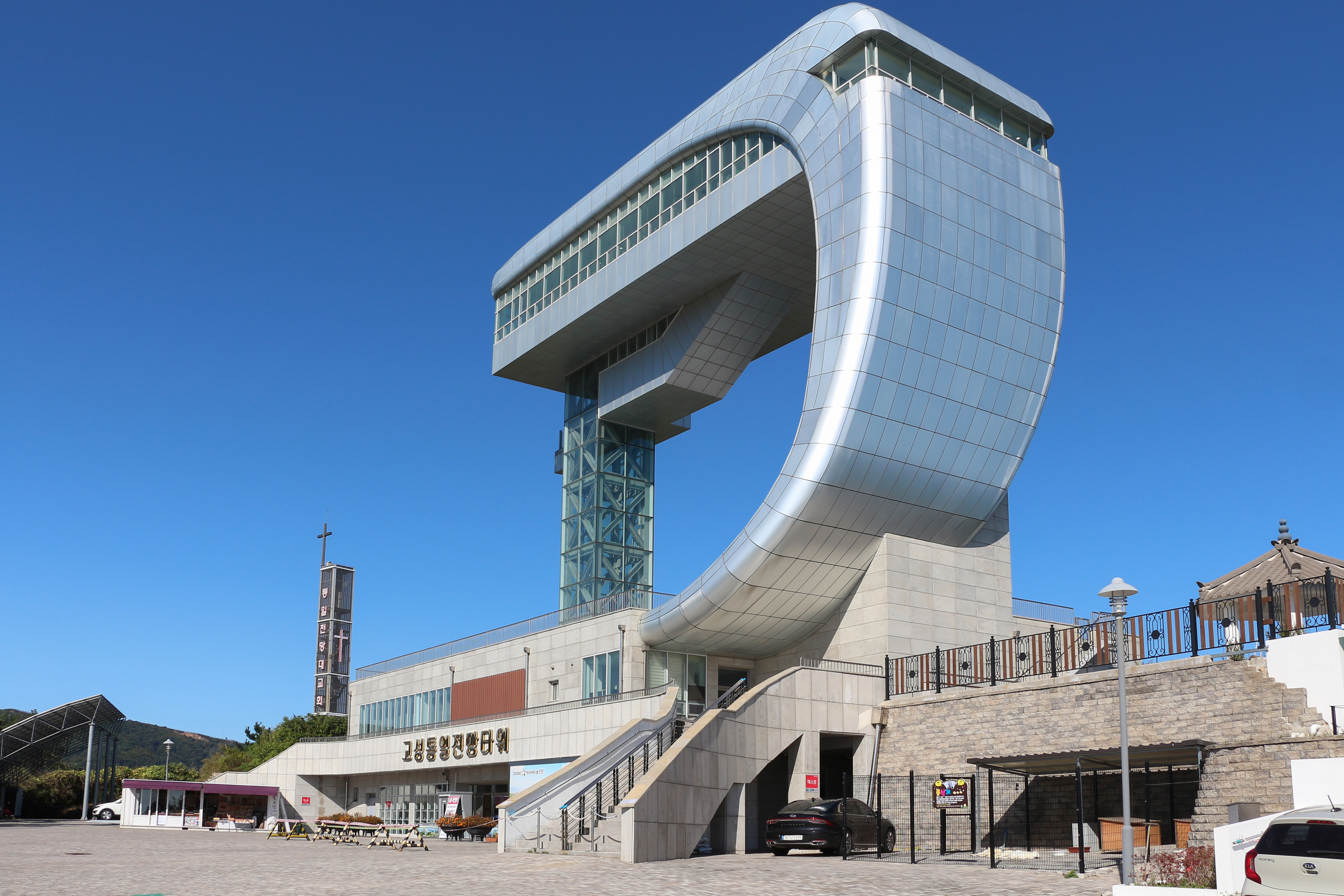

- Flag Emblem of Goseong

- Location in South Korea
- Country: South Korea
- State: Gangwon
- Administrative divisions: 2 eup, 3 myeon

Area
  - Total: 664.34 km^{2} (256.50 sq mi)

Population (2018)
  - Total: 29,118
  - Density: 44/km^{2} (110/sq mi)

Korean name
- Hangul: 고성군
- Hanja: 高城郡
- RR: Goseong-gun
- MR: Kosŏng-gun

Goseong County (Korean: 고성군; [kosʌŋɡun]) is a county in the South Korean state of Gangwon.

Prior to the Korean Armistice Agreement of 1953 which ceased the Korean War, Goseong, which is located north of the 38th parallel, was a part of North Korea. Kaesong, which is south of the 38th parallel and a part of South Korea before 1953, became part of the North after the Armistice.

== Festival ==
The Goseong Lavender Festival is held every June. The lavender festival has a concert, a trial performance of lavender perfume, and a variety of lavender classes. In addition, there are programs that can be enjoyed by anyone from children to the elderly, such as lavender pizza making, children's drawing contest, and poetry making.

== 2019 fire ==
On April 4, 2019, high winds led to a high-voltage power line owned by Korea Electric Power Corporation to fall, causing an electric arc. The fire spread to the cities of Sokcho, Inje, Donghae and Gangneung, resulting in two deaths, over 30 injuries and the evacuation of over 4,000 residents. The fire burned 1,307 acres (5.3 km^{2}) and damaged some 200 homes and 2,000 buildings, causing estimated damage of KRW 5.2 billion ($4.6 million). More than 13,000 firefighters were mobilized nationwide to fight the fire. By April 6-7, the fire was extinguished.

On April 20, 2023 Korea Electric Power Corporation was found to be liable for the fire and ordered to pay $6.6 million (USD) to evacuees. In January 2023, seven current and former Korea Electric Power Corporation employees were acquitted of charges related to safety failures.

== Sister cities ==
- Gangbuk District, Seoul
- Jixi, Heilongjiang, China

== See also ==
- Kosong county (Kangwon province, North Korea)
