= Ulleungdo =

South Korean island in the Sea of Japan

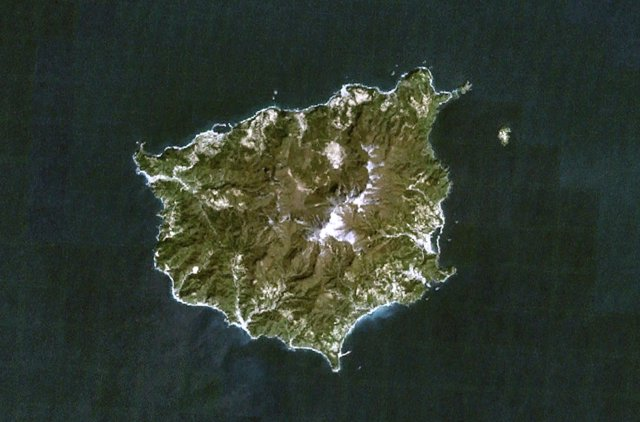
- NASA Landsat 7 image of Ulleungdo (north oriented at top)
- Interactive map of Ulleungdo

Geography
- Location: Sea of Japan
- Coordinates: 37°30′04″N 130°51′23″E
- Area: 72.86 km^{2} (28.13 sq mi)
- Highest elevation: 984 m (3228 ft)

Administration
- South Korea
- County: Ulleung County
- Province: North Gyeongsang Province
- North Korea (claimed)
- County: T'ongch'ŏn County
- Province: Kangwŏn Province

Demographics
- Population: 9,191 (Sep 2020.)
- Pop. density: 126/km^{2} (326/sq mi)
- Ethnic groups: Koreans

Korean name
- Hangul: 울릉도
- Hanja: 鬱陵島
- RR: Ulleungdo
- MR: Ullŭngdo
- IPA: [uɭːɯŋdo]

Ulleungdo (Korean: 울릉도; pronounced [uɭːɯŋdo]), also spelled Ulreungdo, is a South Korean island 120 kilometres (65 nmi; 75 mi) east of the Korean Peninsula in the Sea of Japan. It was formerly known as Dagelet Island or Argonaut Island in Europe. Volcanic in origin, the rocky steep-sided island is the top of a large stratovolcano which rises from the seafloor, reaching a maximum elevation of 984 metres (3,228 ft) at Seonginbong Peak. The island is 9.5 kilometres (6 mi) in length and ten kilometres (6 mi) in width; it has an area of 72.86 km^{2} (28.13 sq mi). It has a population of 10,426 inhabitants.

The island makes up the main part of Ulleung County, North Gyeongsang Province, South Korea, and is a popular tourist destination. The main city of Ulleungdo is the port of Dodong (도동; 道洞), which serves as the main ferry port between Ulleungdo and the South Korean mainland. After tourism, the main economic activity is fishing, including its well-known harvest of squid, which can be seen drying in the sun in many places.

== History ==
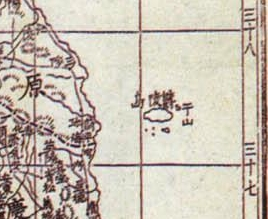
Daehanjiji (1899) – Ulleungdo and Liancourt Rocks

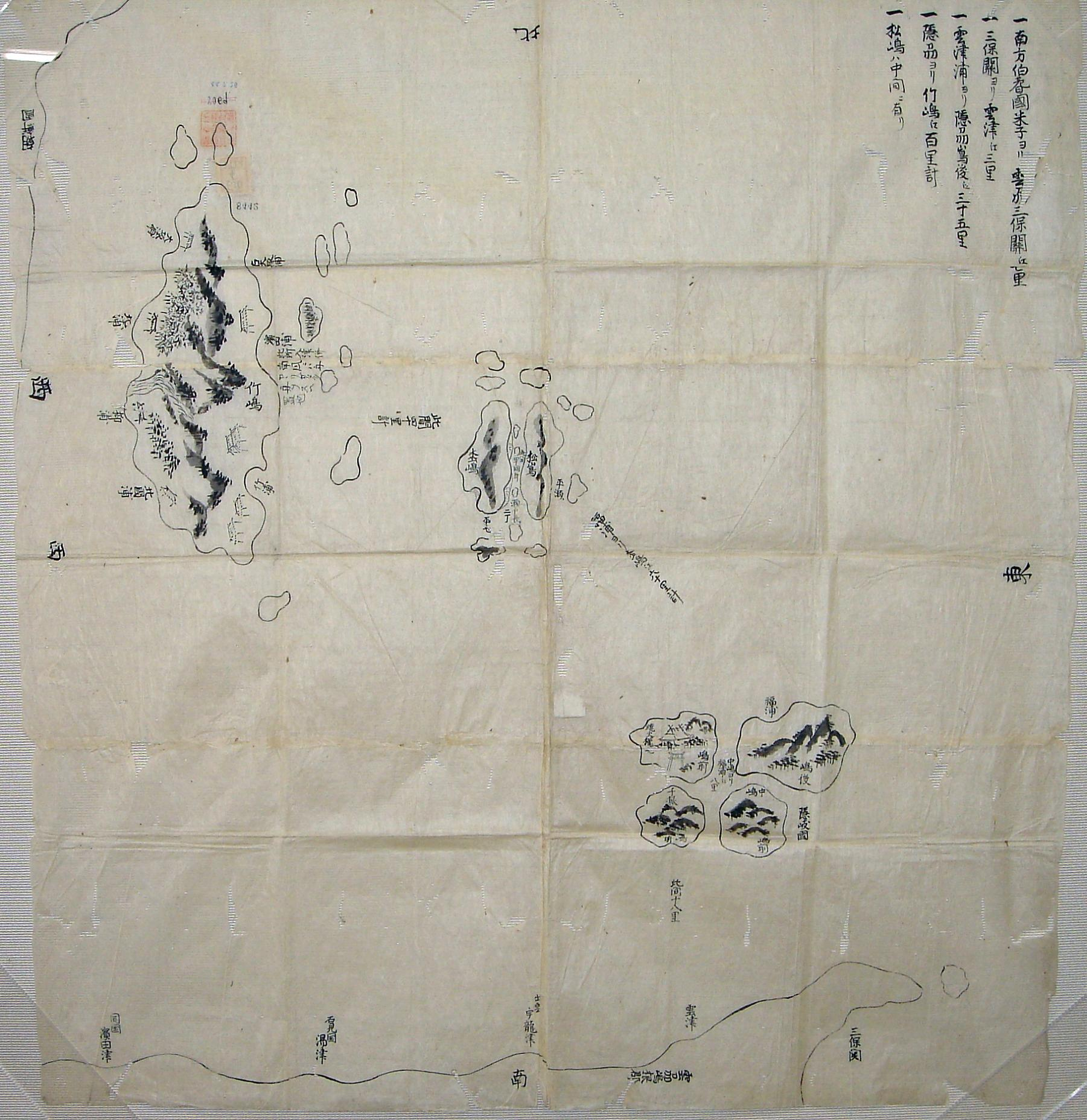
The Japanese map of 1724 – Oki Islands (lower right), Liancourt Rocks (center), and Ulleungdo (left)

Archaeological evidence indicates that the island was first inhabited in the 1st millennium BC. The first confirmed historical reference to Ulleungdo is in the historical text Samguk sagi for the year 512. In that year, the Silla general Kim Isabu conquered the island, which had previously been the autonomous nation of Usan-guk. Some accounts relate that he used a number of wooden lions to intimidate the population, threatening to turn them loose unless they surrendered.

Usan-guk did not remain under the Silla rule, however, and the island did not become a permanent political part of Korea until 930, when it was annexed by Goryeo. Ulleungdo was attacked a number of times during the late Goryeo and early Joseon dynasties. It was devastated by Jurchen pirate raids in the 11th century, and by Wokou pirate raids in the 14th century. A clash with Japan over fishing rights in the 1690s was precipitated by the Korean fisherman An Yong-bok. In response to these difficulties, Joseon adopted an "empty-island" policy, which, however, proved impossible to enforce. The empty-island policy was officially rescinded in 1881, after which the government sought to encourage additional settlement of Ulleungdo.

American whaleships cruised for right whales off the island between 1848 and 1892. Some went ashore nearby Jukdo to club pinnipeds.

== Geography and climate ==
Ulleungdo is a volcanic island that rose from the seabed during the Cenozoic period, and consists of trachyte, andesite, and basalt. Hot spot volcanic activity by the General Isabu seamount, dissolved Simheungtaek seamount and Liancourt Rocks and Ulleungdo with An Yong-bok seamount was created as well. Liancourt Rocks is 4.6 million years ago estimated 2.5 million years ago, and the creation of Ulleungdo to us, 2.5 million years ago in 5,000 years ago.

The island consists primarily of trachyandesite rock. A major explosive eruption around 8000 BCE decapitated its top to form a caldera.

There is Seonginbong Peak in the center of the island. The Nari Basin is part of a caldera in the northern part of the island, and is the island's only flat surface. The Nari Basin is a unique caldera floor formed by the collapse of the central part of the volcano, and further volcanic activity within this caldera created the Albong (egg peak), making it a rare example of a double volcano structure.

Ulleungdo has a humid subtropical climate (Köppen climate classification Cfa), though it resembles the west coast of Japan much more than Korea, since winters are cloudy with heavy rainfall, albeit not to the same extent as cities such as Kanazawa or Akita.

- Highest Temperature: 35.4 °C (95.7 °F) on August 8, 2013
- Lowest Temperature: −13.6 °C (7.5 °F) on February 26, 1981
- Highest Daily Precipitation: 257.8 millimetres (10.15 in) on September 3, 1981
- Wettest Year: 2,236.9 millimetres (88.07 in) in 2003

Climate data for Ulleung (1991–2020 normals, extremes 1938–present)
Month	Jan	Feb	Mar	Apr	May	Jun	Jul	Aug	Sep	Oct	Nov	Dec	Year
Record high °C (°F)	15.3 (59.5)	19.2 (66.6)	21.8 (71.2)	26.1 (79.0)	30.8 (87.4)	32.2 (90.0)	34.6 (94.3)	35.4 (95.7)	32.4 (90.3)	27.2 (81.0)	24.5 (76.1)	18.6 (65.5)	35.4 (95.7)
Mean daily maximum °C (°F)	4.4 (39.9)	5.6 (42.1)	9.6 (49.3)	15.1 (59.2)	19.7 (67.5)	22.5 (72.5)	25.5 (77.9)	26.9 (80.4)	23.2 (73.8)	18.8 (65.8)	13.2 (55.8)	7.2 (45.0)	16.0 (60.8)
Daily mean °C (°F)	1.7 (35.1)	2.5 (36.5)	5.8 (42.4)	11.1 (52.0)	15.8 (60.4)	19.1 (66.4)	22.7 (72.9)	23.8 (74.8)	20.0 (68.0)	15.4 (59.7)	9.9 (49.8)	4.3 (39.7)	12.7 (54.9)
Mean daily minimum °C (°F)	−0.5 (31.1)	0.0 (32.0)	2.9 (37.2)	7.8 (46.0)	12.5 (54.5)	16.5 (61.7)	20.5 (68.9)	21.7 (71.1)	17.7 (63.9)	13.0 (55.4)	7.4 (45.3)	1.9 (35.4)	10.1 (50.2)
Record low °C (°F)	−11.6 (11.1)	−13.6 (7.5)	−9.9 (14.2)	−2.7 (27.1)	3.8 (38.8)	7.8 (46.0)	12.5 (54.5)	14.7 (58.5)	8.9 (48.0)	0.7 (33.3)	−5.9 (21.4)	−9.6 (14.7)	−13.6 (7.5)
Average precipitation mm (inches)	117.4 (4.62)	91.3 (3.59)	76.4 (3.01)	97.8 (3.85)	108.5 (4.27)	116.8 (4.60)	175.0 (6.89)	176.7 (6.96)	173.6 (6.83)	100.9 (3.97)	116.9 (4.60)	129.3 (5.09)	1,480.6 (58.29)
Average precipitation days (≥ 0.1 mm)	18.8	14.5	12.0	9.0	8.6	8.6	12.0	11.6	10.6	9.3	13.1	18.2	146.3
Average snowy days	17.7	13.2	7.4	1.0	0.0	0.0	0.0	0.0	0.0	0.1	3.4	13.1	55.9
Average relative humidity (%)	68.6	68.4	67.5	67.2	70.2	79.6	84.7	83.4	79.3	71.4	67.6	67.3	72.9
Mean monthly sunshine hours	102.0	118.1	180.5	216.5	238.5	185.5	165.1	176.6	163.7	178.8	132.0	104.1	1,961.4
Percentage possible sunshine	29.5	34.2	45.1	53.7	51.7	39.7	33.6	38.8	42.5	50.7	42.6	33.7	41.7
Source: Korea Meteorological Administration (percent sunshine 1981–2010)

== Flora and fauna ==
The island and surrounding water were registered as a marine protected area to secure rich biodiversity in 2014.

The rowan tree species Sorbus ulleungensis is endemic to the island.

A 2024 genetic analysis determined that a beech tree, Fagus multinervis, is endemic to Ulleungdo. It was previously assumed to be conspecific with Fagus engleriana, a Chinese beech tree, as they are phenotypically identical.

North Pacific right whales and pinnipeds were targeted by whalers and sealers in the adjacent waters. Fin whales were also commonly observed historically, and other cetaceans, such as minke whales and dolphins, may appear around the island.

Japanese sea lions, now extinct, once bred on the island.

A 2013 study estimated that 1,177 species of insects inhabit the island.

== Tourism ==
Favorite activities for tourists are hiking, fishing, and eating hoe (a Korean raw fish dish). Sightseeing boats make regular three-hour circuits about Ulleungdo, departing from the harbor at Dodong and passing by all the points of interest along the coast, including many interesting rock formations and the small neighboring island of Jukdo. Other scenic sites are Seonginbong, the highest peak on the island (984 m (3,228 ft)); Bongnae waterfall; the "natural icehouse"; and a coastal cliff from which the Liancourt Rocks can be discerned in the distance.

An airport on the island was planned since 2013 and is under construction since 2020. The design of the new airport was revamped in 2023 for larger aircraft and is expected to open in 2027.

Chotdaebawi Rock (literally "Candle Rock") is one of the most well-known natural landmarks of Ulleungdo. The 30-meter-high basalt column rises vertically from the sea near Dodong Harbor and resembles a candle standing upright, hence its name. It is a popular sightseeing spot for visitors to the island and is often included in boat tours around the coast.

== See also ==
- List of volcanoes in Korea
- Lee Kyu-Won
