= Myonggo station =

Railway station in North Korea

Myŏnggo 명고

Korean name
- Hangul: 명고역
- Hanja: 鳴皐驛
- Revised Romanization: Myeonggo-yeok
- McCune–Reischauer: Myŏnggo-yŏk

General information
- Location: Myŏnggo-ri; T'ongch'ŏn, Kangwŏn Province; North Korea
- Coordinates: 39.0700°N 127.7389°E
- Owner: Korean State Railway
- Line: Kŭmgangsan Ch'ŏngnyŏn Line

History
- Opened: 1 September 1929
- Former names: Hŭpkok
- Original company: Chosen Government Railway

Services
Preceding station	Korean State Railway	Following station
Tongjŏngho towards Anbyŏn	Kŭmgangsan Ch'ŏngnyŏn Line	Kŭmbonggang towards Jejin (ROK)
Location

Myŏnggo station is a railway station in Myŏnggo-ri, T'ongch'ŏn county, Kangwŏn province, North Korea on the Kŭmgangsan Ch'ŏngnyŏn Line of the Korean State Railway.

== History ==
The station, originally called Hŭpkok station was opened on 1 September 1929 by the Chosen Government Railway, along with the rest of the first section of the original Tonghae Pukpu Line from Anbyŏn to here.
