= Anbyon County =

County in North Korea

Coordinates: 39°01′48″N 127°30′00″E

Anbyŏn County 안변군
- County

Korean transcription(s)
  - Chosŏn'gŭl: 안변군
  - Hancha: 安邊郡
  - McCune-Reischauer: Anbyŏn-gun
  - Revised Romanization: Anbyeon-gun
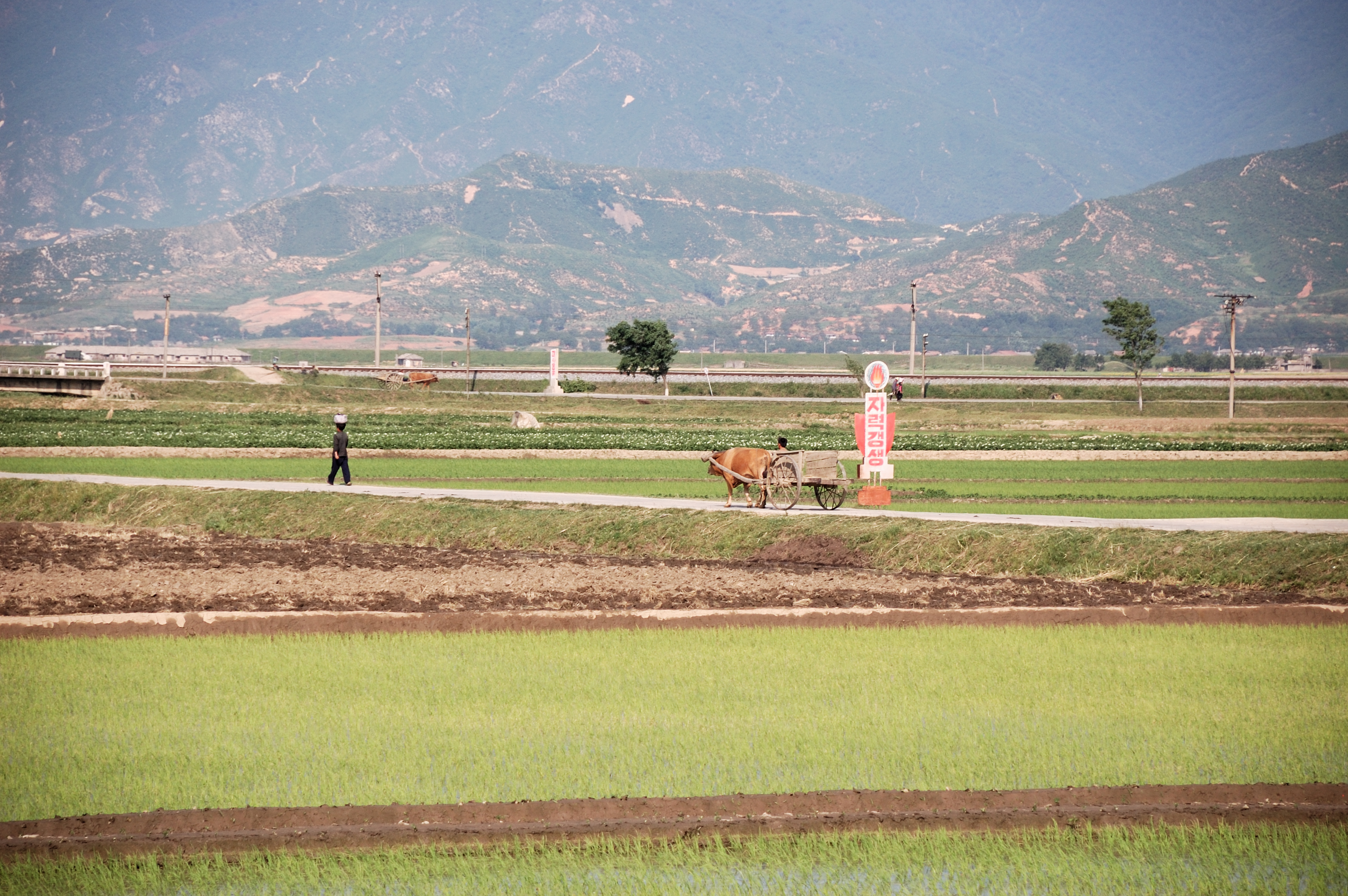
- Chŏnsam Cooperative Farm, Anbyŏn

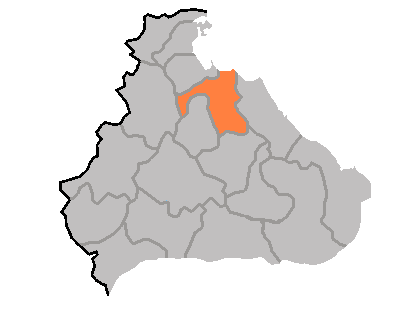
- Map of Kangwon showing the location of Anbyon
- Country: North Korea
- Province: Kangwon Province
- Administrative divisions: 1 ŭp, 2 workers' districts, 28 ri

Area
  - Total: 506.5 km^{2} (195.6 sq mi)

Population (2008)
  - Total: 93,960
  - Density: 185.5/km^{2} (480.5/sq mi)

Anbyŏn is a kun, or county, in Kangwŏn province, North Korea. Originally included in South Hamgyŏng province, it was transferred to Kangwŏn province in a September 1946 reshuffling of local government.

== Physical features ==
The southwest portion of the county is bounded by the Masingryŏng and Taebaek mountains, which meet at the pass of Ch'ugaryŏng. The highest point is Paegamsan.

Anbyŏn's major streams include the Namdaech'ŏn and the Hakch'ŏn. The Anbyŏn Plain is situated along the Namdaech'ŏn's course. The temperature is warmer in the north than in the south.

== Administrative divisions ==
Anbyŏn county is divided into 1 ŭp (town), 2 rodongjagu (workers' districts) and 28 ri (villages):

- Anbyŏn-ŭp
- Apkang-rodongjagu
- Ryongdae-rodongjagu
- Chungp'yŏng-ri
- Ch'ŏnsam-ri
- Hakch'ŏl-li
- Hwasal-li
- Kwap'yŏng-ri
- Mihyŏl-li
- Mop'ung-ri
- Munsu-ri
- Naesal-li
- Namgye-ri
- Ogye-ri
- Ong-ri
- Paehwa-ri
- Paeyang-ri
- Pisal-li
- Pongsal-li
- P'unghwa-ri
- Ryŏngsil-li
- Ryongsŏng-ri
- Ryukhwa-ri
- Samsŏng-ri
- Sangŭm-ri
- Sap'yŏng-ri
- Sinhwa-ri
- Songsal-li
- Suraktong-ri
- Tongp'o-ri
- Wŏllang-ri

== Economy ==
=== Agriculture ===
In the Anbyŏn Plain, rice-farming is the predominant industry. Orcharding also plays an important role.

=== Manufacturing ===
Tile manufacturing also takes place.

=== Mining ===
There are local deposits of gold, silver, copper and zinc, but they are not widely exploited.

=== Electricity generation ===
In 2000, construction of the Anbyŏn Youth Power Station, a hydroelectric facility, was completed. The workers were honored with a personal communique from Kim Jong Il.

=== Film-making ===
Anbyŏn is the setting for many North Korean films. Thus it has been dubbed the Hollywood of North Korea.

=== Chemicals ===
A chemical weapons storage facility is believed to be located in the county's Chiha-ri precinct. The facility is said to include numerous tunnels dug deep into the mountains, and may also host some biological weapons.

== Military ==
A missile test facility is located on a beach in Sangum-ri (Korean: 상음리) with an observation point attended by Kim Jong Un.

== Transport ==
The Kangwŏn and Kŭmgangsan Ch'ŏngnyŏn lines of the Korean State Railway pass through the county, which is also served by road.

== Wildlife ==
Anbyŏn contains a 1,000-hectare (2,500-acre) site, Anbyŏn Field, that has been identified as an Important Bird Area by BirdLife International because it is a wintering ground for red-crowned cranes.

== See also ==
- Geography of North Korea
- Administrative divisions of North Korea
