= Tongchon County =

T'ongch'ŏn County 통천군
- County

Korean transcription(s)
  - Chosŏn'gŭl: 통천군
  - Hancha: 通川郡
  - McCune-Reischauer: T'ongch'ŏn kun
  - Revised Romanization: Tongcheon-gun
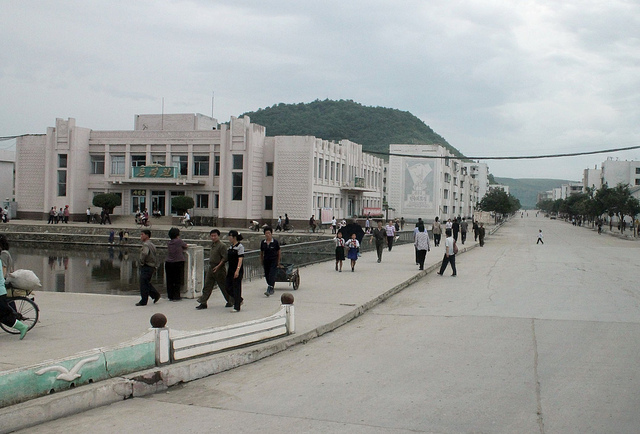
- A view of downtown T'ongch'ŏn-ŭp, North Korea.

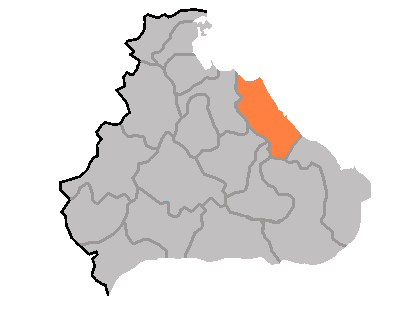
- Map of Kangwon showing the location of Tongchon
- Country: North Korea
- Province: Kangwŏn Province
- Administrative divisions: 1 ŭp, 30 ri

Area
  - Total: 607 km^{2} (234 sq mi)

Population (2008 census)
  - Total: 89,357
  - Density: 147/km^{2} (381/sq mi)

T'ongch'ŏn County (Korean: 통천군) is a kun, or county, in Kangwŏn province, North Korea. It abuts the Sea of Japan (East Sea of Korea) to the north and east. Famous people from T'ongch'ŏn include Hyundai Founder Chung Ju-yung, who is believed to have been born there.

== History ==
The region was called Hyuyang County during the reign of King Gwanggaeto. The region became part of Silla during the reign of King Jinheung, The modern borders of the county was set in 1952, after the county was reformed.

== Current administrative divisions ==
T'ongch'ŏn county is divided into 1 ŭp (town) and 30 ri (villages):

=== T'ongch'ŏn-ŭp ===
The town contains the administrative centre of the county, and was created in 1952. The town has the tomb of the ancestor of the Tongchon Kim clan, known for being the son of Crown Prince Maui. The town also hosts the Chongseok Gazebo (Chongsokjong), known as one of the eight scenic sites of Kwandong region (Kwandongpalgyeong), and is designated by the DPRK as the no. 214 in the list of the natural monuments of North Korea.

=== Changdae-ri ===
Changdae-ri (Korean: 장대리; Hanja: 長臺里; RR: Jangdae-ri) village is known for Gwangdaeam Mountain and the Jangdaechon River.

=== Changjil-li ===
The village of Changjil-li is known for its narrow spit at the coast.

=== Chasal-li ===
Chasal-li village was named after the mountain Chasan. The town is a major production center for Perenniporia, used for traditional medicine.

=== Chungch'ŏl-li ===
The village is famous for its Osmunda japonica. 97% of the town is mainly a forest area.

=== Hasu-ri ===
The village was named for having an intersection of different river streams merging. The town's geographical features are mainly beaches and mounds with rather low height.

=== Hwat'ong-ri ===
The village was named as such for a big market that has existed in the region.

=== Kahŭng-ri ===
89% of the village is farmland.

=== Kangdong-ri ===
The village was named as such for its rivers. The region is home to Lake Sijung.

=== Kŏsŏng-ri ===
The village contains lot of pasture used to raise cows, and has an over the water route connected from the Chigung harbor. Near the village of Munchi in the southern side of Kosongri village, the mound called Munchiryong, which was historically known for thieves and tigers, is located near Potanri and Tongchonup,

=== Kŭmral-li ===
The village was named after Kumran Cave, known in legend as the storehouse for the mythical plant of immortality.

=== Kunsal-li ===
The village was newly created, and was named as such for its group of mountains, but the region mainly consists of plains.

=== Kuŭp-ri ===
The village was named as such because it was the old administrative center of the county. The region is home to the Tongchonbol, a vast plain.

=== Mip'yŏng-ri ===
The village was named as such for its plains under the mountains.

=== Myŏnggo-ri ===
The village was named for the crying of cranes in the nearby mountains. The region is home to Chonapo Lake.

=== Pangp'o-ri ===
The region has the Gwanggyochon and Jijangchon Rivers.

=== Pyŏg'am-ri ===
The region is home to the Suchong and Kidae Mountains.

=== P'aech'ŏl-li ===
The region is known for its rivers. Kumbong River is home to the big-scaled redfin.

=== P'ungsal-li ===
The village hosts the Kumbong River in its southern side.

=== Rimong-ri ===
Rimong-ri (Korean: 리목리; Hanja: 梨木里; RR: Rimok-ri) was named as such for its collection of pear trees.

=== Rosang-ri ===
The village was named for its location on the top of the road.

=== Ryongch'ŏl-li ===
The village was named after a stream where legend tells a dragon ascended from.

=== Ryongsu-ri ===
The region was named as such because it sources its water used for agriculture from Ryongso Pond.

=== Sillim-ri ===
The region produces potatoes and beans.

=== Sindae-ri ===
The village was named as such because it was newly founded city. The rivers of Kahung and Kyegok flow through the region.

=== Sinhŭng-ri ===
The village was named as such because it was a newly created village.

=== Songjŏl-li ===
The town was originally known as Solbatgu, meaning pine tree town.

=== Taegong-ri ===
The village has a noticeable sericulture industry.

=== Poho-ri ===
Major produce in the region is corn and rice.

=== Pongho-ri ===
The village was named after the peak and lake. 73% of its land consists of mountainous areas. On the northwest side of the village a mountain known as Sanyanggogae or Saeyangigogae is connected to Sanyang village and Potalli Village.

=== Pot'al-li ===
The village was named for its coal. The region hosts Potan Mountain. The region also has the Hakjang Valley (Hakjanggol) beside Hakjang Mountain, known as a breeding site of cranes.

== Old administrative divisions ==
Due to the relatively scarce resources about the current regions occupied by North Korea, South Korea base their administrative divisions of the northern regions on the subdivisions before the 1945 Liberation of Korea. Here are the subdivisions that existed:

=== Gojeoeup ===
The town of Gojeoeup (庫底邑), with an area of 90.07 km², was created in 1936 as a renamed version of Sunryeongmyeon (順嶺面), which was created in 1914 as a result of the merger of Sundalmyeon and Ryeongoemyeon. It was home to the Chongsukjong in Chongsokri, the Eosusanseong fortress in Sanggojeori, and the Ssanghaksanseong fortress in Toilri. The town had 19 ris, which were Hagojeo, Sanggojeo, Eoun, Samgye, Guhang, Pohang, Banwol, Saho, Hungun, Baekjong, Botong, Sin, Sinwol, Oryu, Jeonsan, Toil, Jeonchon, Chongsok and Tongsudong. The town was demoted to Gojeomyeon in 1949.

== Geography ==
The terrain is mountainous in the west, sloping down to the coastal plains (including the T'ongch'ŏn Plain and Hupkok Plain) in the east. The plains are used for rice cultivation. The area is prone to fog. As elsewhere along the Kangwŏn coast, there are various lagoons.

== Economy ==
Due to the extensive plains, agriculture is a major local industry; in addition to rice, the county produces barley, wheat, oats, millet, maize, soybeans, and potatoes. Lumbering and fishing also play a role.

== Military ==
The Tongchon Naval Base is a major construction project of a naval base for the Korean People's Navy ongoing since June 2026.

=== Tourism ===
The region has long been a popular destination due to the proximity of Mount Kŭmgang and, in recent years, tourists from South Korea have passed through the area in great numbers.

== Transport ==
Road

A highway runs along the coastline.

Rail

T'ongch'ŏn county is served by T'ongch'ŏn Station and five other stations on the Kŭmgangsan Ch'ŏngnyŏn Line of the Korean State Railway.

== Legends ==
=== Salt vendor and the Yeolnyeo ===
Also known as soul of yeollyeo, the legend is associated with Chongsokjong. It tells the story of a farmer Lee Sitaek, who after going on a long journey as a salt merchant finds a house where a yeollyeo who lives alone because her husband died from a tiger attack. She later kills the tiger with an axe. After finding her husband's corpse she chooses to commit suicide by burning herself in fire to follow his husband.

== Notable people from Tongchon County ==
- Chung Ju-yung, South Korean entrepreneur, businessman and the founder of Hyundai Group
- Ri Yong-ho, North Korean vice-marshal
- Ri Chun-hee, North Korean broadcaster for Korean Central Television

== See also ==
- Geography of North Korea
- Administrative divisions of North Korea
