= Anbyon station =

Railway station in North Korea

Anbyŏn 안변

Korean name
- Hangul: 안변역
- Hanja: 安邊驛
- RR: Anbyeon-yeok
- MR: Anbyŏn-yŏk

General information
- Location: Anbyŏn-ŭp, Anbyŏn County; Kangwŏn Province; North Korea
- Coordinates: 39°2′52″N 127°30′1″E
- Owner: Korean State Railway
- Lines: Kangwŏn Line; Kŭmgangsan Ch'ŏngnyŏn Line

History
- Opened: 16 August 1914
- Original company: Chosen Government Railway

Services
Preceding station	Korean State Railway	Following station
Paehwa towards Kowŏn	Kangwŏn Line	Namsan towards P'yŏnggang
Terminus	Kŭmgangsan Ch'ŏngnyŏn Line	Ogye towards Jejin (ROK)
Location

Anbyŏn station is a railway station in Anbyŏn-ŭp, Anbyŏn County in Kangwŏn province, North Korea. It is located on the Kangwŏn Line, which connects Kowŏn to P'yŏnggang, and is the start of the Kŭmgangsan Ch'ŏngnyŏn Line, which runs to the Mount Kŭmgang Tourist Region and continues south across the DMZ to Chejin in South Korea, although the section between Kŭmgangsan and Chejin has been out of service since 2008.

== History ==
The station, along with the rest of the former Kyŏngwŏn Line, was opened by the Chosen Government Railway (Sentetsu) on 16 August 1914. The first section of the former Tonghae Pukpu Line, from Anbyŏn to Hŭpkok (nowadays called Myŏnggo), was opened by Sentetsu on 1 September 1929. After the partition of Korea following the Pacific War, the section of the Tonghae Pukpu line from Anbyŏn to Kamho fell within North Korea, and was renamed Kŭmgangsan Ch'ŏngnyŏn Line.
