= Donghae Bukbu Line =

Disused railway line linking South Korea & North Korea

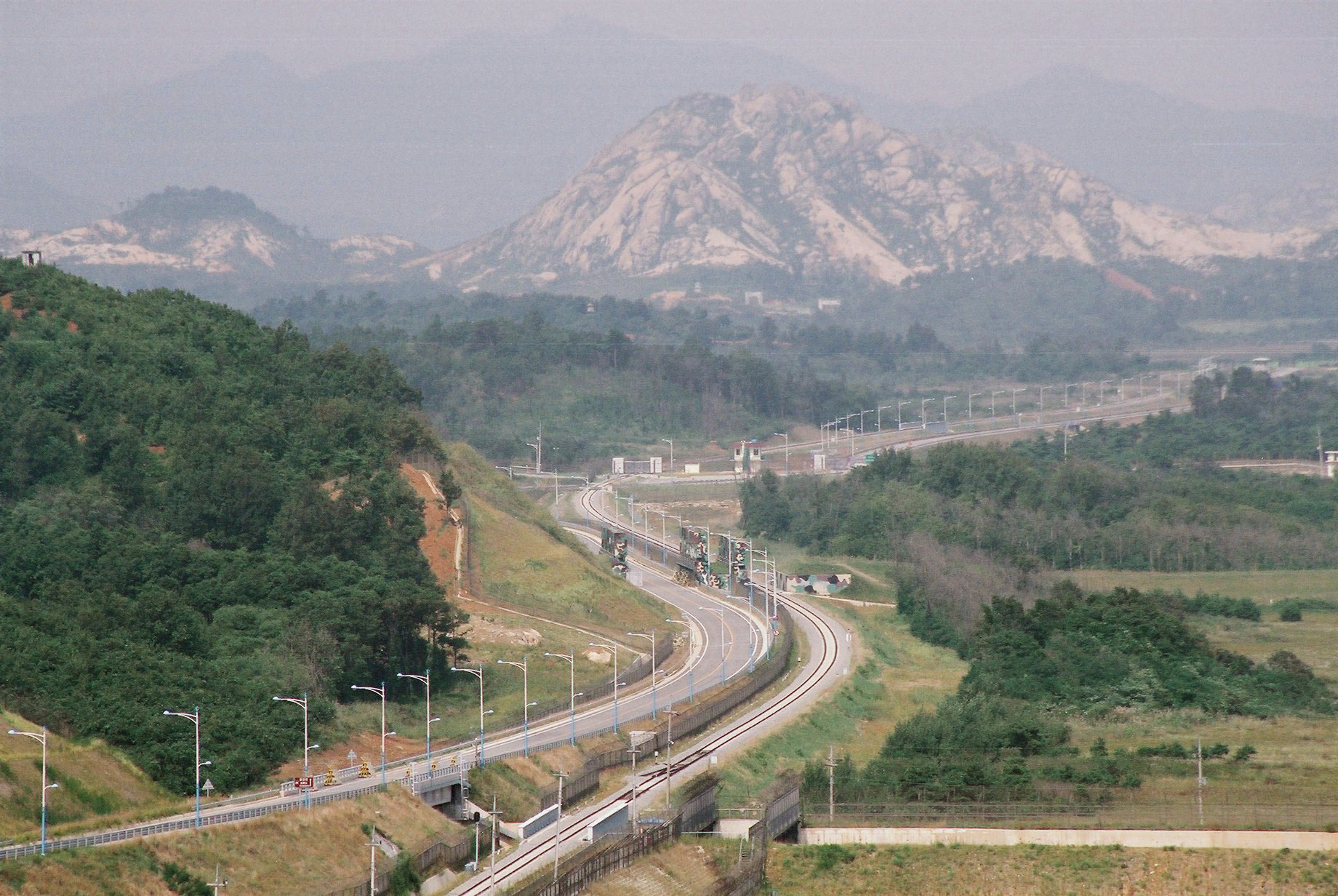
- View of Donghae Bukbu line from Reunification Observatory.

Overview
- Native name: 동해북부선(東海北部線)
- Status: Operational
- Owner: Korea Rail Network Authority
- Locale: Gangwon (South Korea); Gangwon (North Korea)
- Termini: Jejin; Kamho
- Stations: 2

Service
- Type: Heavy rail, Freight rail
- Operator(s): Korail

History
- Opened: Stages between 1929-1937
- Reopening: May 17, 2007
- Closed: January 1, 1967 (Sokcho–Yangyang)

Technical
- Line length: 11.1 km (6.9 mi)
- Number of tracks: Single track
- Track gauge: 1,435 mm (4 ft 8 1/2 in) standard gauge
Route map

- Donghae Bukbu Line
- Hangul: 동해북부선
- Hanja: 東海北部線
- Revised Romanization: Donghae Bukbuseon
- McCune–Reischauer: Tonghae Pukpusŏn

The Donghae Bukbu Line is a former railway line that connected the present-day city of Anbyon in Kangwon Province, North Korea, with Yangyang, Gangwon Province, South Korea. Since the division of Korea it has only carried trains for a brief period during 2007/8. The line originally connected to the Gyeongwon Line running from Gyeongseong (present-day Seoul) to Wonsan.

It began running in 1929 between Anbyon and Hupgok, and was extended to Yangyang in 1937. Plans had called for it to be extended south to Pohang, where it would have connected with the Donghae Nambu Line. However, this extension was not completed before the fall of the Japanese regime in 1945, and since then the tracks have been idle.

== Reconstruction ==
=== Cross-border section ===
With increasing talk of peaceful Korean reunification beginning in the 1990s, there have been various efforts to reopen the Donghae Bukbu Line, together with the Gyeongui Line in the west. An opened Donghae Bukbu Line would provide ready land access to the Mount Kumgang Tourist Region, which is open to South Korean tourists. After the completion of reconstruction on the 11.1 km (6.9 mi) cross-border section between Jejin in South Korea and Gamho in North Korea, the initial test run was set for May 25, 2006, but North Korean military authorities cancelled the plans a day ahead of the scheduled event. On the South Korean side, Korail opened Jejin Station in 2006 and has maintained some rolling stock for a trial run.

At a meeting held in Pyongyang, North Korea, on April 22, 2007, North and South Korea agreed to restart the project. On May 17, 2007, the first train to cross the border between North and South Korea in over 50 years entered South Korea from the North, from Kaesŏng to Dorasan on the Gyeongui line (whose northern section is known as the P'yŏngbu line). More than one million civilian visitors crossed the DMZ until the route was closed following the shooting death of a 53-year-old South Korean tourist in July 2008. After a joint investigation was rebuffed by the North, the Republic of Korea government suspended tours to the resort. Since then the resort, and the Donghae Bukbu Line, have effectively been closed by the North.

=== East coast railway ===
During the efforts to re-open the cross-border section, the South Korean government has taken up the idea of a railway all along the east coast from Pohang to the North Korean border, with a primary aim to serve freight traffic that could eventually access the Trans-Siberian Railway. As part of the project, plans foresaw to connect the end of the Yeongdong Line in Gangneung with Jejin by 110.2 km (68.5 mi) long, single-track, non-electrified line for 150 km/h (93 mph), effectively re-building the Donghae Bukbu Line on a new alignment.

Three years later, the project re-surfaced as a domestic project. On September 1, 2010, the South Korean government announced a strategic plan to reduce travel times from Seoul to 95% of the country to under 2 hours by 2020. The section from Gangneung to Sokcho forms a part of the plan as a line for 230 km/h (140 mph), and may see KTX service.

== Gallery ==
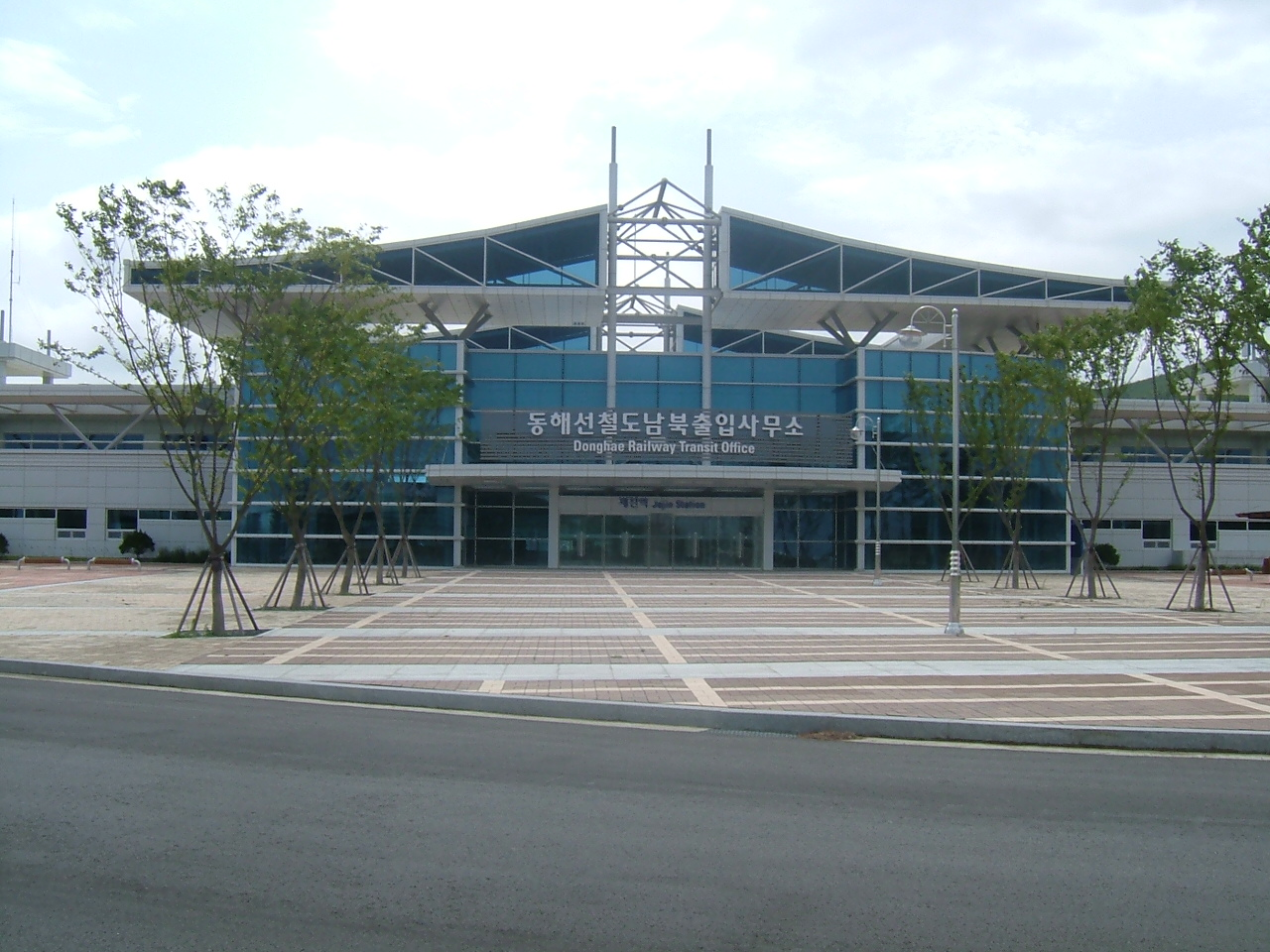
External view of Jejin station.

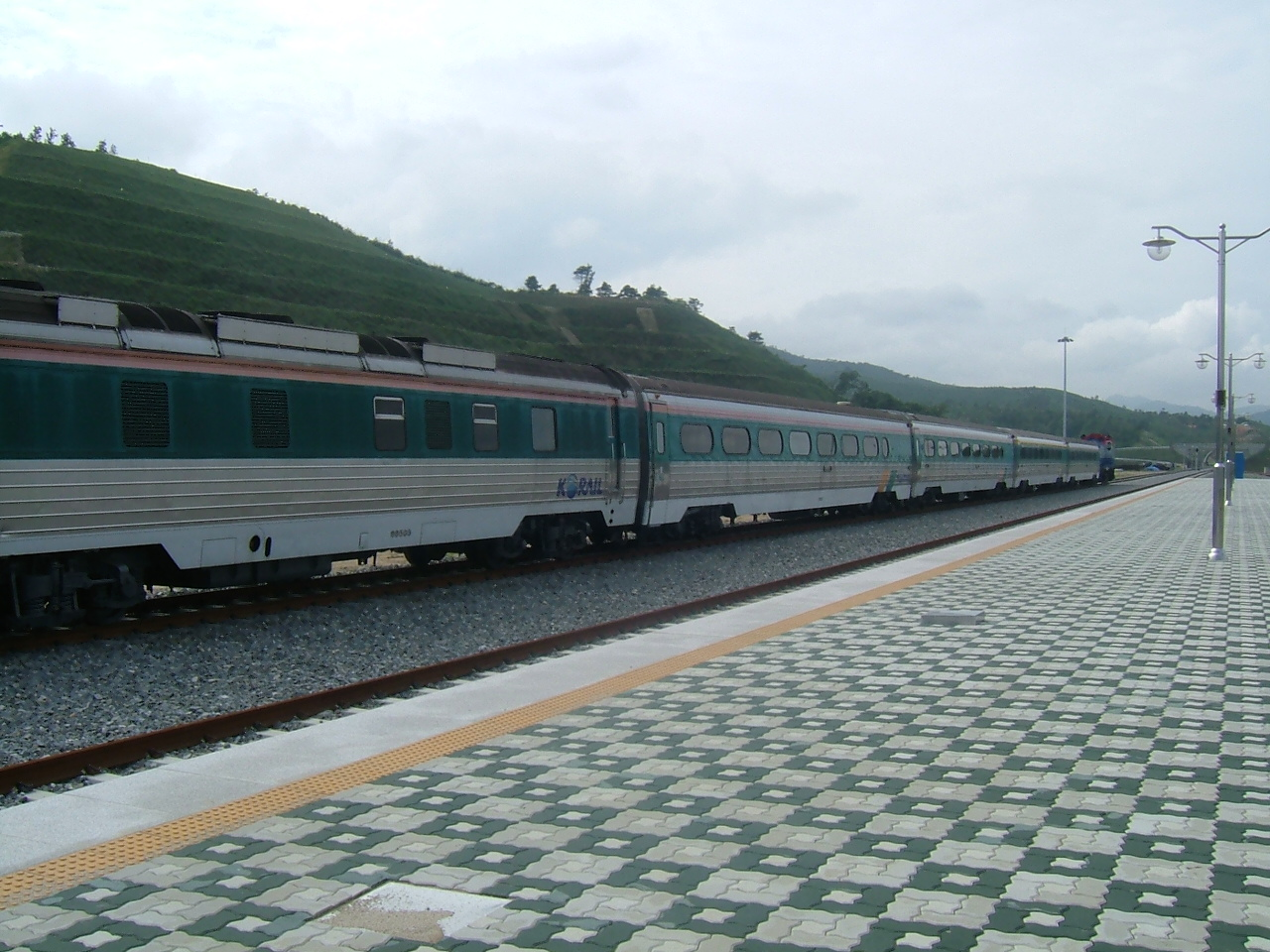
Jejin station platform with a Korail DEL 4400 streamline Saemaeul-ho train.

== See also ==
- Kŭmgangsan Ch'ŏngnyŏn Line - the North Korean section of the former Donghae Bukbu Line
