= Kumgangsan Chongnyon Line =

Railway line in North Korea

Overview
- Other names: Tonghae Pukpu Line 동해북부선(東海北部線)
- Native name: 금강산청년선(金剛山靑年線)
- Status: Operational
- Owner: Chosen Government Railway (1929–1945); Korean State Railway (since 1945)
- Locale: Kangwon
- Termini: Anbyŏn; Kamho
- Stations: 17

Service
- Type: Heavy rail, Passenger/freight rail Regional rail
- Operator(s): Korean State Railway

History
- Opened: Stages between 1929-1937
- Closed: 1950 (Samilp'o - Jejin)
- Reopened: 17 May 2007 (Samilp'o - Jejin)

Technical
- Line length: 114.8 km (71.3 mi)
- Number of tracks: Single track
- Track gauge: 1,435 mm (4 ft 8 1/2 in) standard gauge
- Electrification: 3000 V DC Overhead line (Anbyŏn - Kŭmgangsan Ch'ŏngnyŏn)
Route map
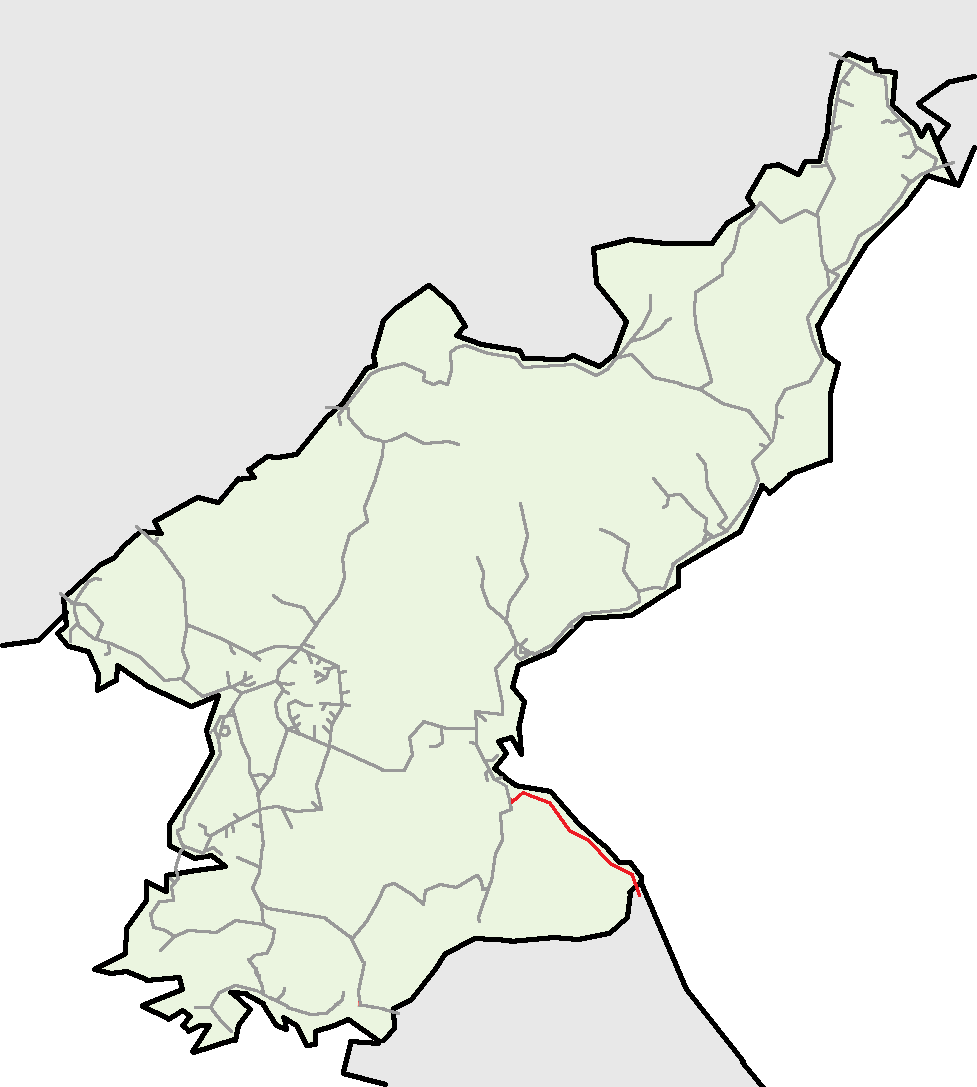

- Kumgangsan Chongnyon Line
- Chosŏn'gŭl: 금강산청년선
- Hancha: 金剛山青年線
- Revised Romanization: Geumgangsancheongnyeonseon
- McCune–Reischauer: Kŭmgangsanch'ŏngnyŏnsŏn

The Kŭmgangsan Ch'ŏngnyŏn Line is an electrified standard-gauge trunk line of the Korean State Railway in North Korea running from Anbyŏn to Kamho. The total length of the line is 114.8 km (71.3 mi), but it is only in regular use as far as Kŭmgangsan Ch'ŏngnyŏn; the length of the line to there is 101 km (63 mi).

== History ==
The line was originally built by the Chosen Government Railway (Sentetsu) as part of the Tonghae Pukpu Line, from Anbyŏn on Sentetsu's Kyŏngwŏn Line to Yangyang. The construction and opening of the line took place in several stages, with the first section opening on 1 September 1929, and the last on 1 December 1937. Plans were made to extend the line from Yangyang to Pohang, but Japan's defeat in the Pacific War and the subsequent collapse of the General-Government of Korea prevented completion of the extension.

After the partition of Korea, the line was split between the North and South, with the section from Anbyŏn to Kamho becoming the Kŭmgangsan Ch'ŏngnyŏn Line in the north, while the section from Jejin to Yangyang became the Tonghae Pukpu Line operated by the Korean National Railroad.

Electrification of the line was completed on 15 April 1997.

In 2007, after the reconstruction of the disused section between Kamho and Jejin, passenger trains began operating from the south to bring southern tourists to the Mount Kŭmgang Tourist Region. More than one million civilian visitors crossed the DMZ until the route was closed following the shooting death of a 53-year-old South Korean tourist in July 2008. Plans were being considered to make this line part of a trans-Korean line from Pohang to Tumangang, to connect South Korea's railway network to the Trans-Siberian Railway.

== Route ==
A yellow background in the "Distance" box indicates that section of the line is not electrified.

Distance (km)		Station Name		Former Name		
Total	S2S	Transcribed	Chosŏn'gŭl (Hanja)	Transcribed	Chosŏn'gŭl (Hanja)	Connections
0.0	0.0	Anbyŏn	안변 (安邊)			Kangwŏn Line
8.9	8.9	Ogye	오계 (梧溪)			
14.9	6.0	Sangŭm Ch'ŏngnyŏn	상음청년 (桑陰靑年)	Sangŭm	상음 (桑陰)	
25.2	10.3	Tongjŏngho	동정호 (洞庭湖)	Chadong	자동 (慈東)	
31.4	6.2	Myŏnggo	명고 (鳴皐)	Hŭpkok	흡곡 (歙谷)	
38.0	6.6	Kŭmbonggang	금봉강 (金峯江)	P'aech'ŏn	패천 (沛川)	
47.4	9.4	Sijungho	시중호 (侍中湖)	Songjŏn	송전 (松田)	
54.3	6.9	T'ongch'ŏn	통천 (通川)	Kojŏ	고저 (庫底)	
61.0	6.7	Tonghae	동해 (東海)	T'ongch'ŏn	통천 (通川)	
65.1	4.1	Sindae-ri	신대리 (新垈里)	Pyŏgyang	벽양 (碧養)	
70.2	5.1	Ryŏmsŏng	렴성 (濂城)			
75.7	5.5	Tup'o	두포 (豆浦)	Tubaek	두백 (荳白)	
86.2	10.5	Nam'ae	남애 (南涯)			
93.2	7.0	Kosŏng	고성 (高城)	Changjŏn	장전 (長箭)	
101.0	7.8	Kŭmgangsan Ch'ŏngnyŏn	금강산청년 (金剛山靑年)	Oegŭmgang	외금강 (外金剛)	
Stations below are not in regular use
~~109.2~~	~~8.2~~			Samilp'o	삼일포 (三日浦)	Closed
111.4	2.2	Samilp'o	삼일포 (三日浦)	Kosŏng	고성 (高城)	
114.8	5.6	Kamho	감호 (鑑湖)			
↑↑ Kukch'ŏl Kŭmgangsan Ch'ŏngnyŏn Line ↑↑
Demilitarized Zone
↓↓ Korail Donghae Bukbu Line ↓↓
125.9	11.1	Jejin, ROK	제진 (猪津)			Donghae Bukbu Line
