= Chungnyeongsan (Gyeonggi) =

Mountain in Gyeonggi Province, South Korea

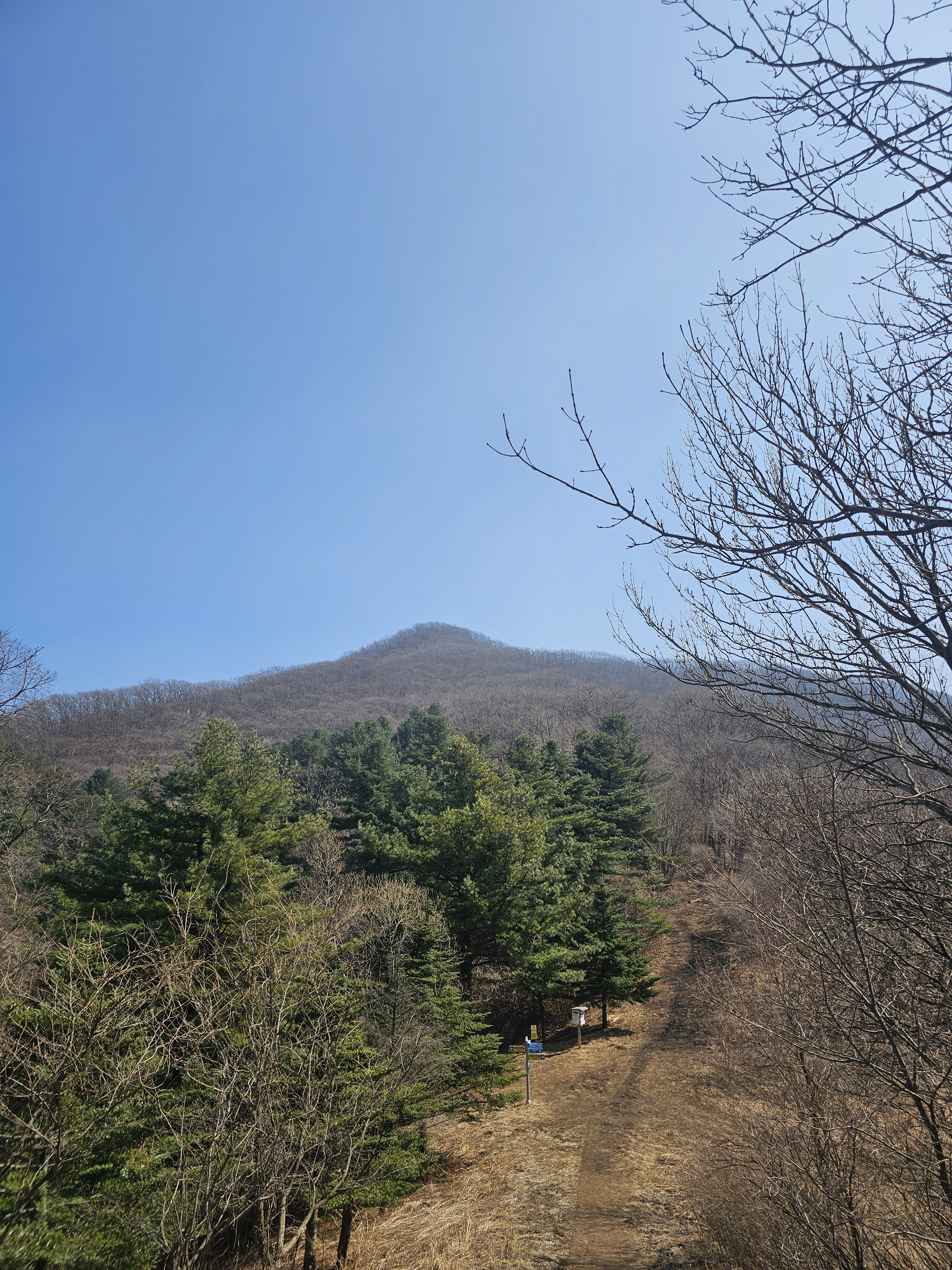
- Summit of Chungnyeongsan

Highest point
- Elevation: 879 m (2,884 ft)
- Listing: Mountains of Korea
- Coordinates: 37°45′10″N 127°19′59″E

Geography
- Country: South Korea
- Province: Gyeonggi

Korean name
- Hangul: 축령산
- Hanja: 祝靈山
- RR: Chungnyeongsan
- MR: Ch'ungnyŏngsan

Chungnyeongsan (Korean: 축령산) is a mountain in Gyeonggi Province, South Korea. Its area extends across Namyangju and Gapyeong County. Chungnyungsan has an elevation of 879 m (2,884 ft).

== Name ==
In Joseon-era literature, it is known by various names: in the Sinjŭng Tongguk yŏji sŭngnam, it is recorded as Birangsan (비랑산; 非郞山); in the Daedongyeojido and Taedongjiji, it is recorded as Biryeongsan (비령산; 飛龍山). The current name stems from local records such as the Kyŏnggiji (경기지; 京畿誌) and Kyŏnggiŭpchi (경기읍지; 京畿邑誌), which was then recorded in the Chosŏn chijijaryo (조선지지자료; 朝鮮地誌資料) during the Japanese colonial rule.

It is said that during the late Goryeo dynasty, Yi Seong-gye, the future founder of the Joseon dynasty, was hunting around the area and could not find any prey. He met a hunter on the way, and was told that this is a sacred mountain, and a ritual should be held for the mountain god. The next day, he ascended its peak and performed a ritual, after which he successfully caught five wild boars. The mountain where he caught the boars was named Odeoksan (오득산; 五得山), meaning 'mountain with five gains'; and the mountain where he held the ritual was named Chungnyungsan, meaning 'mountain to pray spirit'. Its other name, Biryeongsan, has its origins in a legend where a flying dragon was seen above the mountain's valley.

General Nami (1443–1468), a Joseon-era general whom the island Namiseom was named after, also prayed to the spirits in the mountain, and the rock where he prayed remains until today.

== Tourism ==
Boasting a dense pine forest, Chungnyeongsan is a popular destination for hiking and camping, offering people a chance to reconnect with nature. The forest is established as a recreational area in 1995, with campgrounds and accommodations provided. It is listed as part of the 'Eight Scenic Views of Gapyeong' (가평팔경; 加平八景), alongside Cheongpyeong Lake. This Chungnyeongsan shares the same hangul and hanja with the one in Jangseong County, South Jeolla Province, which is also famous for its cypress tree forest. The forest management charges 1,000 won for individuals 19-years or older, but since 2021, residents of Namyangju can enter for free.

An arboretum, the Garden of Morning Calm was established in the foot of the mountain. It is also a popular tourist destination across all four seasons.

== Gallery ==
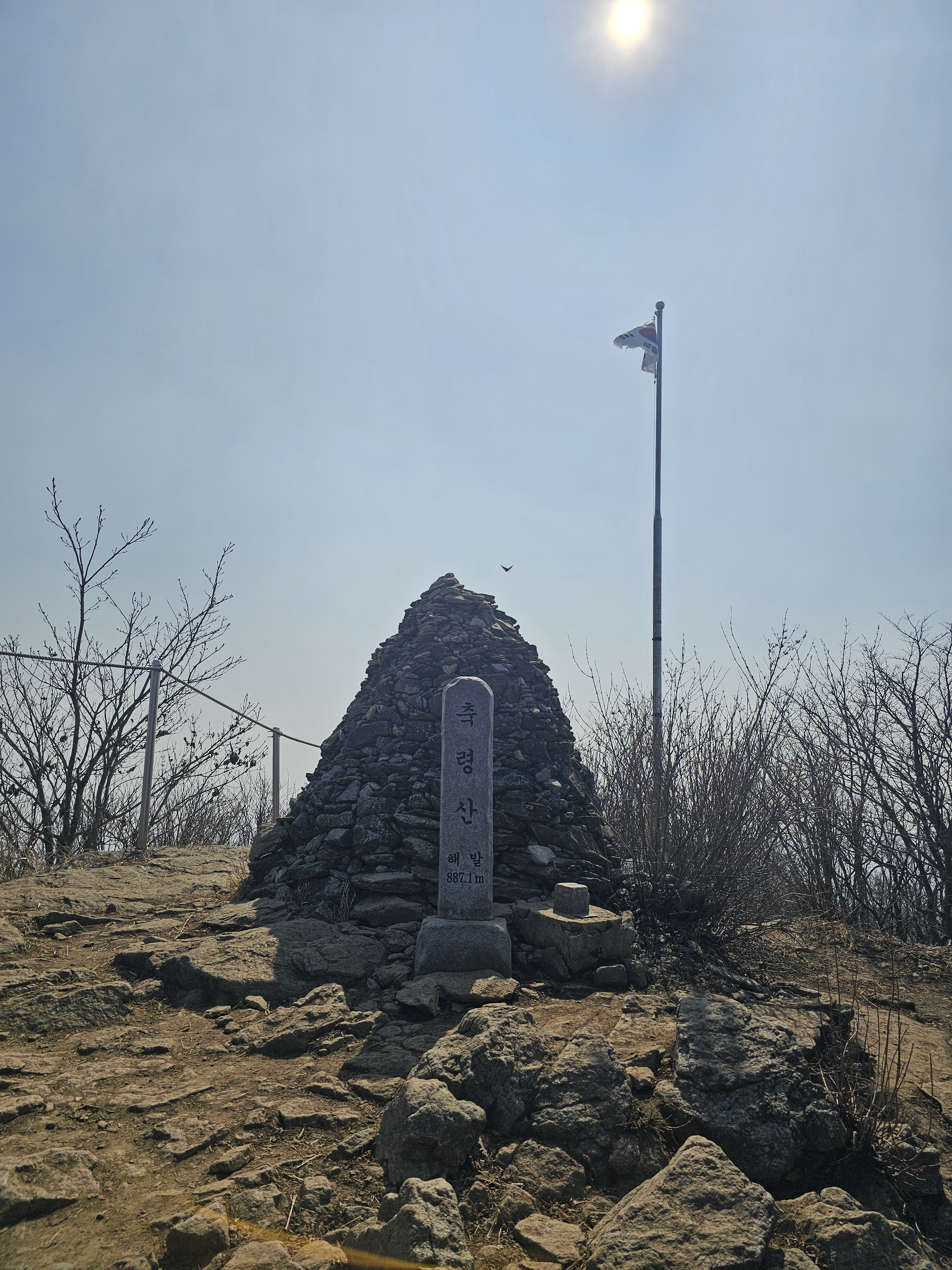
Summit marker

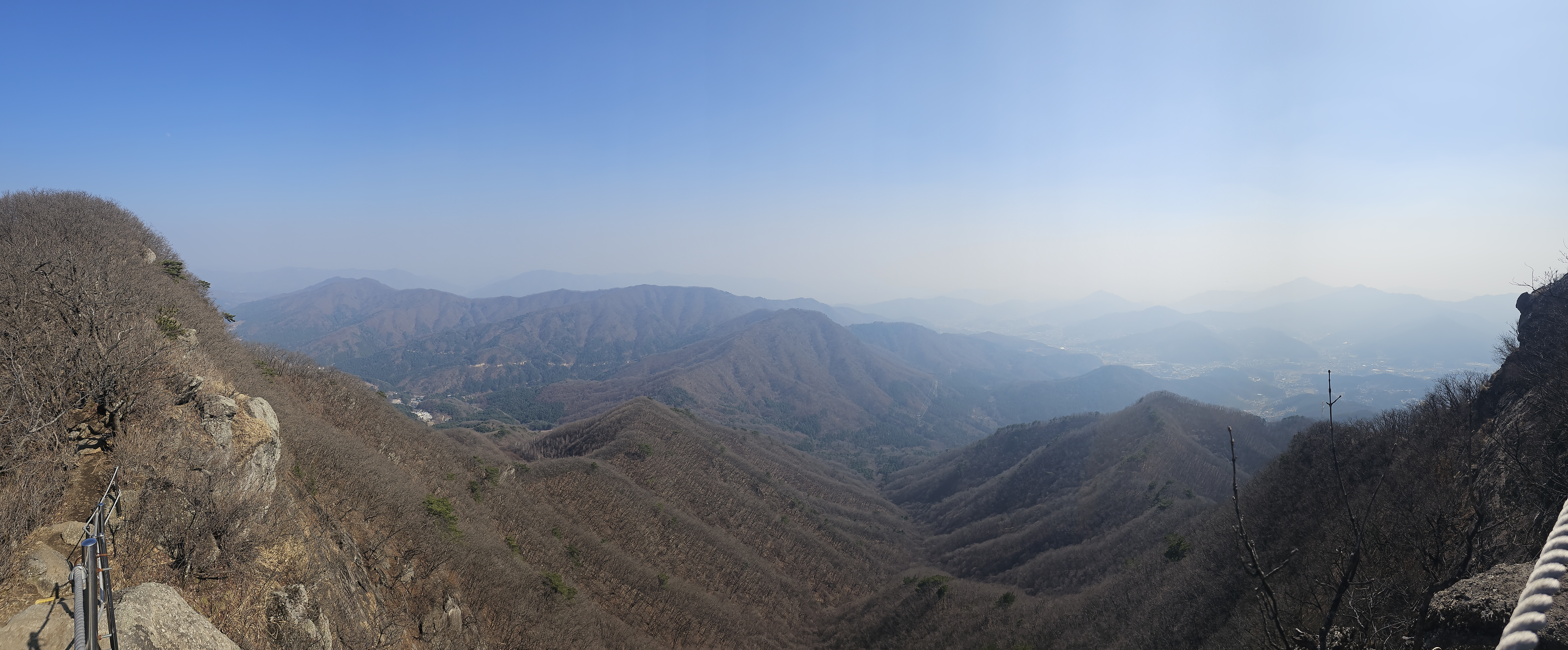
Panoramic view from Chungnyeongsan

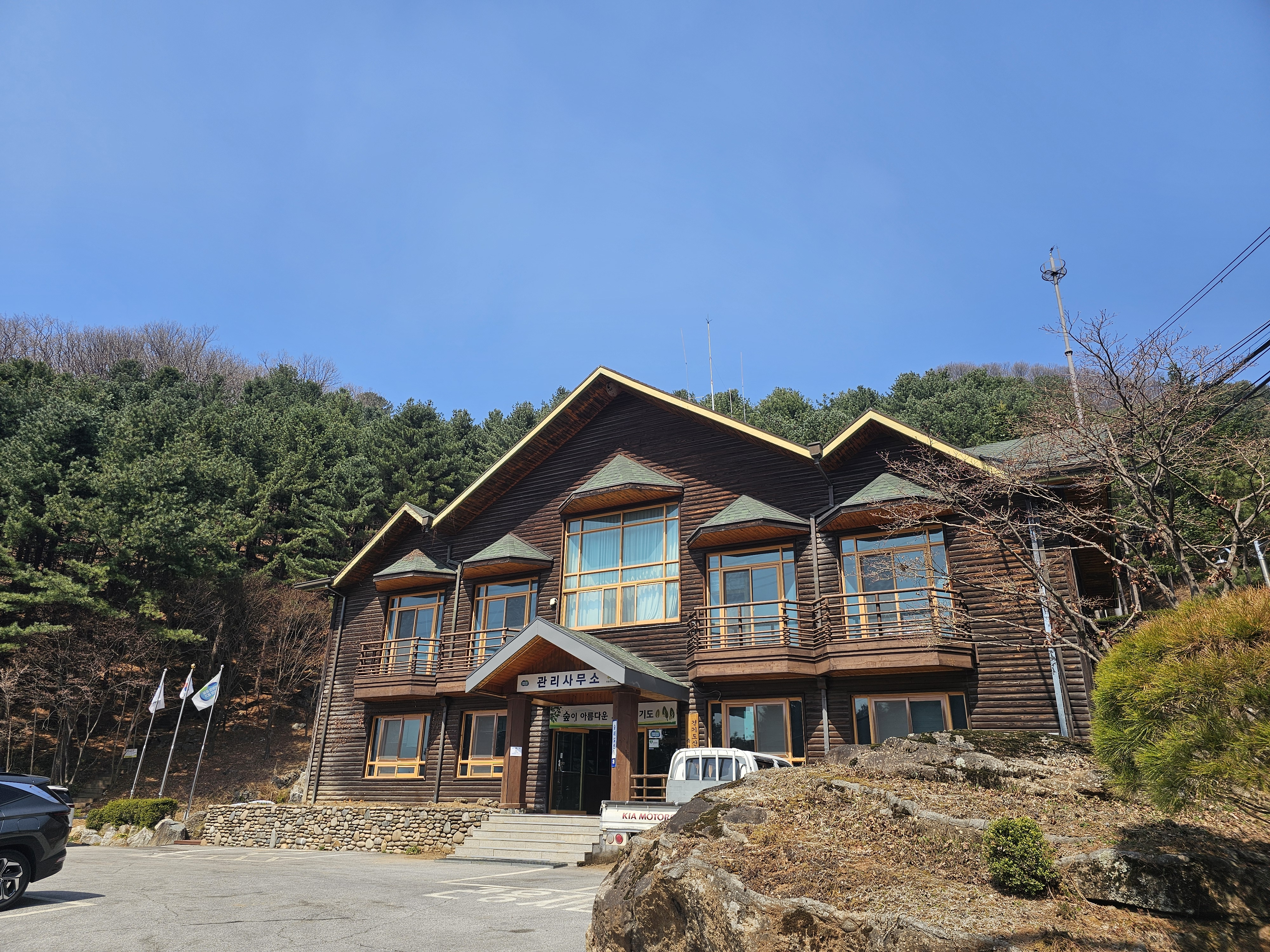
Management office
