= Gungmangbong =

Gungmangbong may refer to:

- Gungmangbong (Chungcheongbuk-do), a mountain in South Korea
- Gungmangbong (Gyeonggi), a mountain in South Korea
