= Cheongpyeong Lake =

Artificial lake in South Korea

Coordinates: 37.708°N 127.457°E

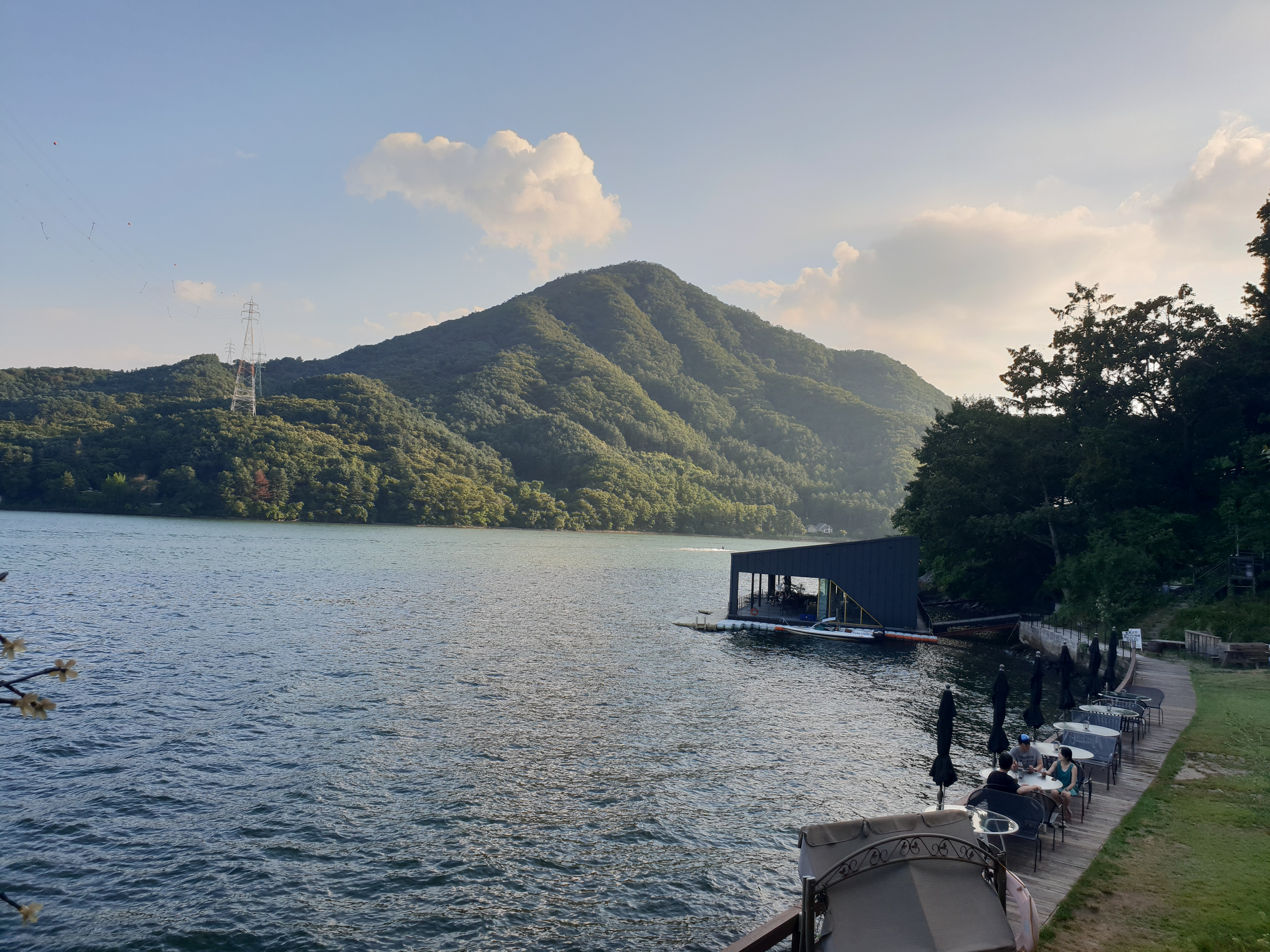

Korean name
- Hangul: 청평호
- Hanja: 淸平湖
- RR: Cheongpyeongho
- MR: Ch'ŏngp'yŏngho

Cheongpyeong Lake (Korean: 청평호) is a clear water artificial lake in Cheongpyeong, Gapyeong County, and Gyeonggi Province, South Korea. It was created with the construction of Cheongpyeong Dam in 1944 to block the Bukhangang River. It is located 50 kilometers (30 miles) away from Seoul, the capital of South Korea.

The lake has an area of 12.5 square kilometres (4.8 mi^{2}), a full water area of 19 km^{2} (7.3 mi^{2}), and a water storage capacity of 180 million tons. In 1977, it was designated as a marine protected area but this was lifted in November 1984.

The lake is surrounded by mountains. Near Cheongpyeong Lake is an amusement park as well as a number of summer homes. Nearby the lake there is water skiing and other recreational activities. Around Cheongpyeong Lake, there are approximately 30 boating areas for water skiing, motorboats, Jet Skis, banana boats, fly fishing, and other water activities. The tourist season is from July to August, accounting for 64.5% of annual footfall.

Cheongpyeong Lake is listed as part of the 'Eight Scenic Views of Gapyeong' (가평팔경; 加平八景), alongside Chungnyungsan's pine forest.
