= Namiseom =

Island in South Korea

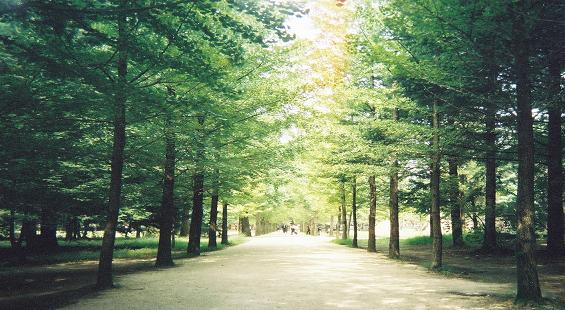
- The view of trees in Nami Island
- Interactive map of Namiseom

Geography
- Location: Cheongpyeong Lake, Chuncheon, Gangwon Province, South Korea
- Coordinates: 37.7900°N 127.5258°E

Korean name
- Hangul: 남이섬
- RR: Namiseom
- MR: Namisŏm

Namiseom (Korean: 남이섬) or Nami Island is a half-moon shaped river island located in Chuncheon, Gangwon Province, South Korea, formed as the land around it was inundated by the rising water of the Bukhan River (northern part of the Han River) as the result of the construction of Cheongpyeong Dam in 1944.

== Etymology ==
The name of the island originates from General Nami (Nam-Yi), who died at the age of 28 after being falsely accused of treason during the reign of King Yejong (r.1468–1470), the eighth king of the Joseon dynasty of Korea. Although his grave was not discovered, there were a pile of stones where his body was supposed to be buried. It was believed that if someone took even one stone from there, it would bring misfortune to their house. A tour company arranged the grave with soil and then developed Namiseom into an amusement park.

== Geography ==
Namiseom is located 3.8 km (2.4 miles) from Gapyeong County, but belongs to Chuncheon in Gangwon Province. It is 430,000 m^{2} (0.17 square miles) in area and approximately 4 km (2.5 miles) in diameter.

== History ==
Min Byeong-do bought the island in 1965, and after that, in 1966, when Gyeongchun Tourism Development Co., Ltd. was established, it began to be developed as a general resort. In April 2000, Gyeongchun Tourism Development changed its name to Nami Island Co., Ltd.

In 2002, the area around Nami Island became the filming stage for the KBS TV drama Winter Sonata, and the number of Japanese tourists visiting Nami increased significantly.

== Naminara Republic ==
Namiseom is home to the Naminara Republic, a self-declared micronation described as "a tourist destination that advocates the concept of a nation."

== Zip line ==
Open in 2010, one of the longest zip lines in Asia got a boost in recognition – and visitation – after it was featured in Korea's highly popular show 1 Night 2 Days, aired in February 2016. Its twin cables start from an 80-meter-tall tower (with a lift), which provides a 7.47% average grade for a 3,083 foot length, bringing a top speed of 35 miles/hour. It reaches the island 940 meters away in about one and a half minutes. The tower is to the north of the island, in Gapyeong-gun, in Gyeonggi Province.

A similar zip line – albeit 1/3 shorter and with a higher grade – starts from the same tower and reaches the nearby island of Jara (Jaraseom), located about 1 km up north of Namiseom on the same river Bukhang, but in neighboring Gapyeong province.

== Gallery ==
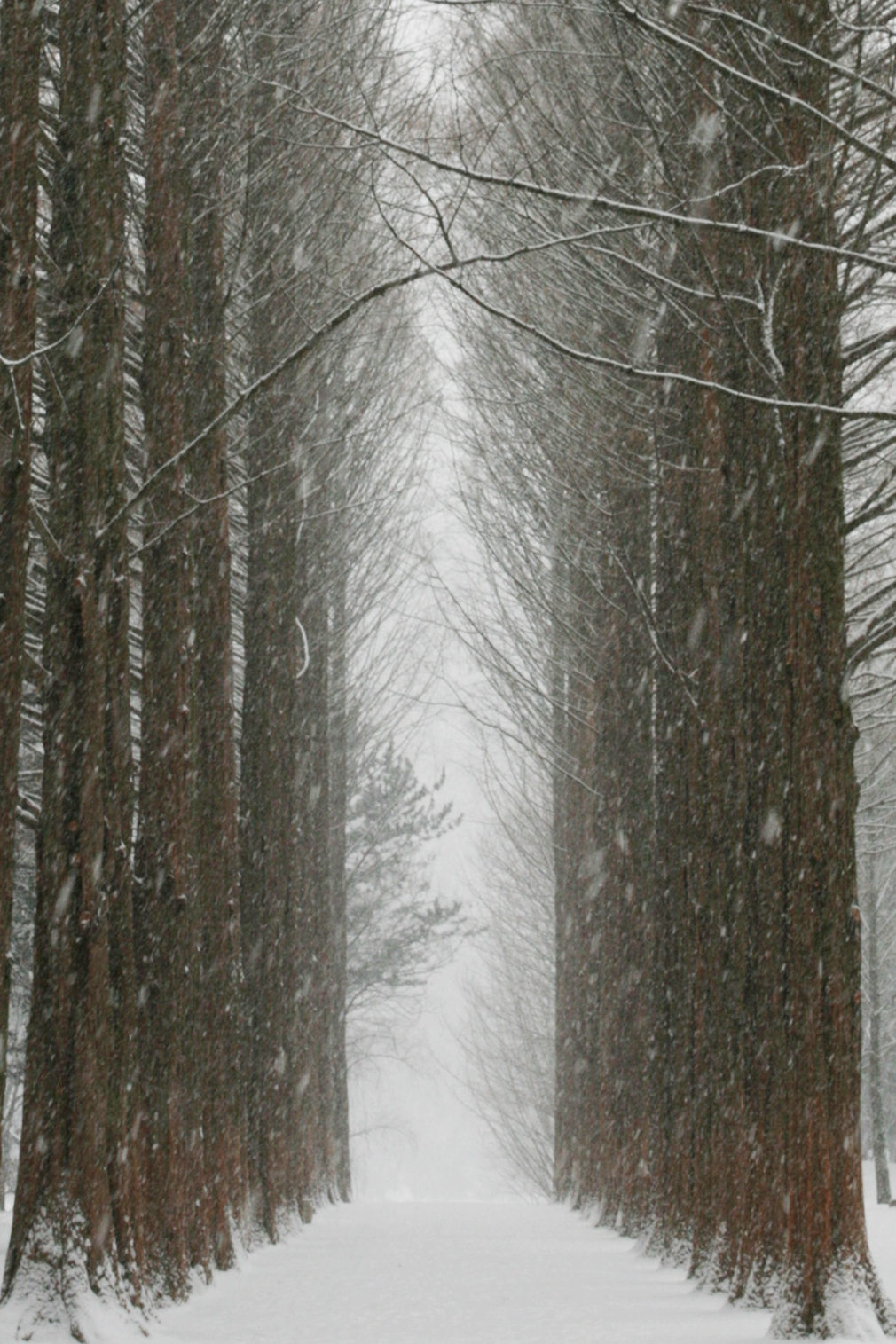

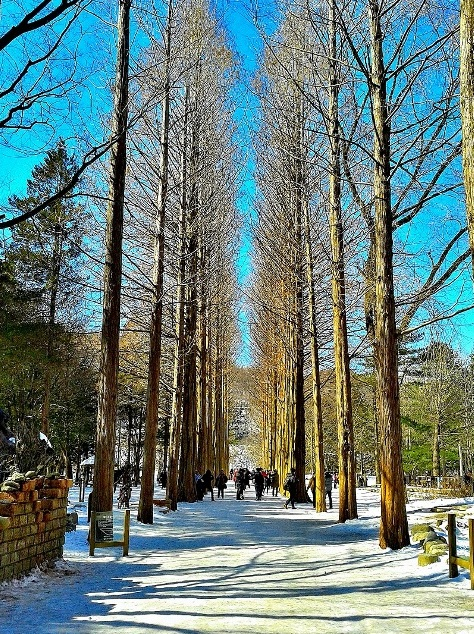

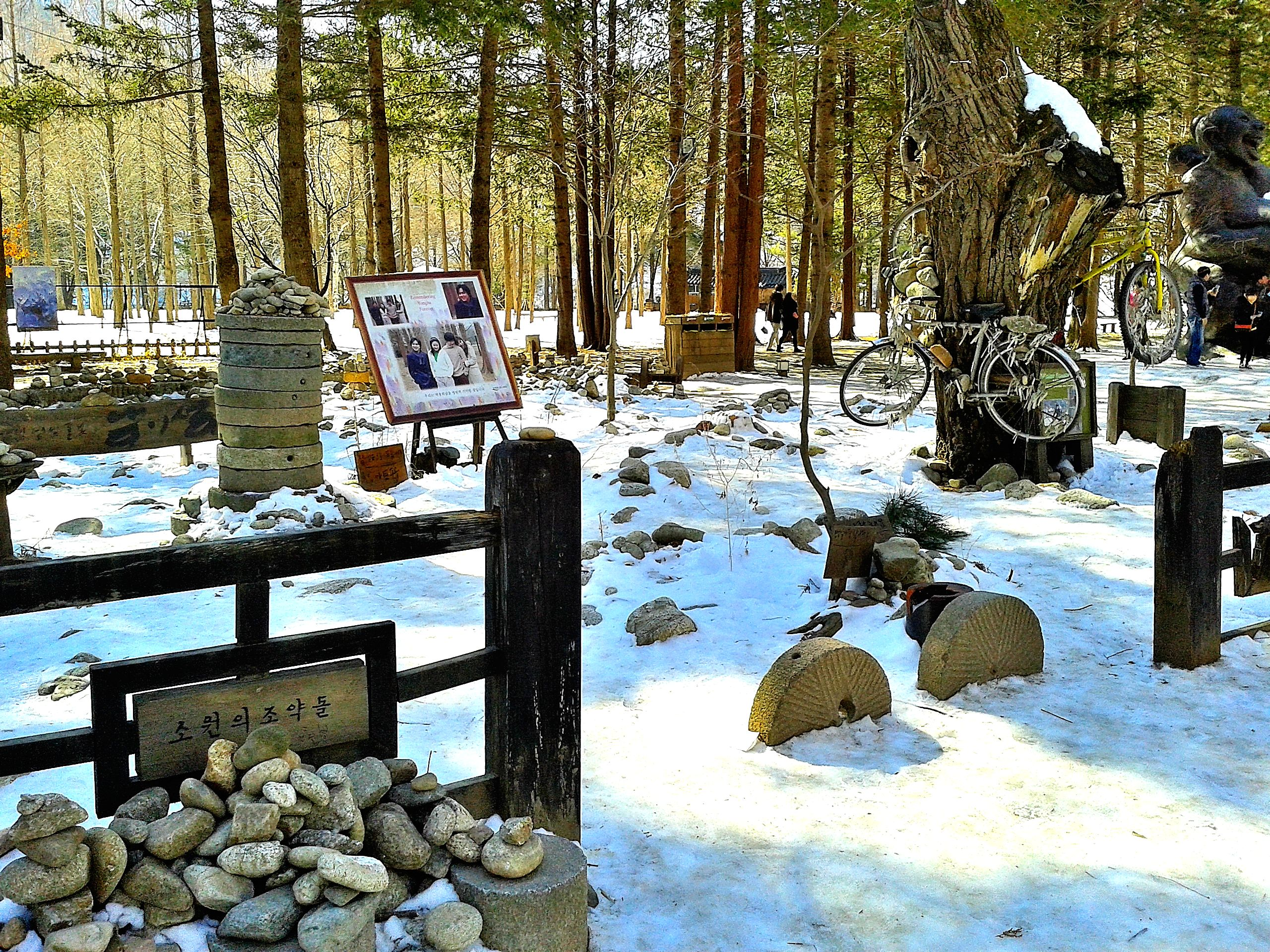

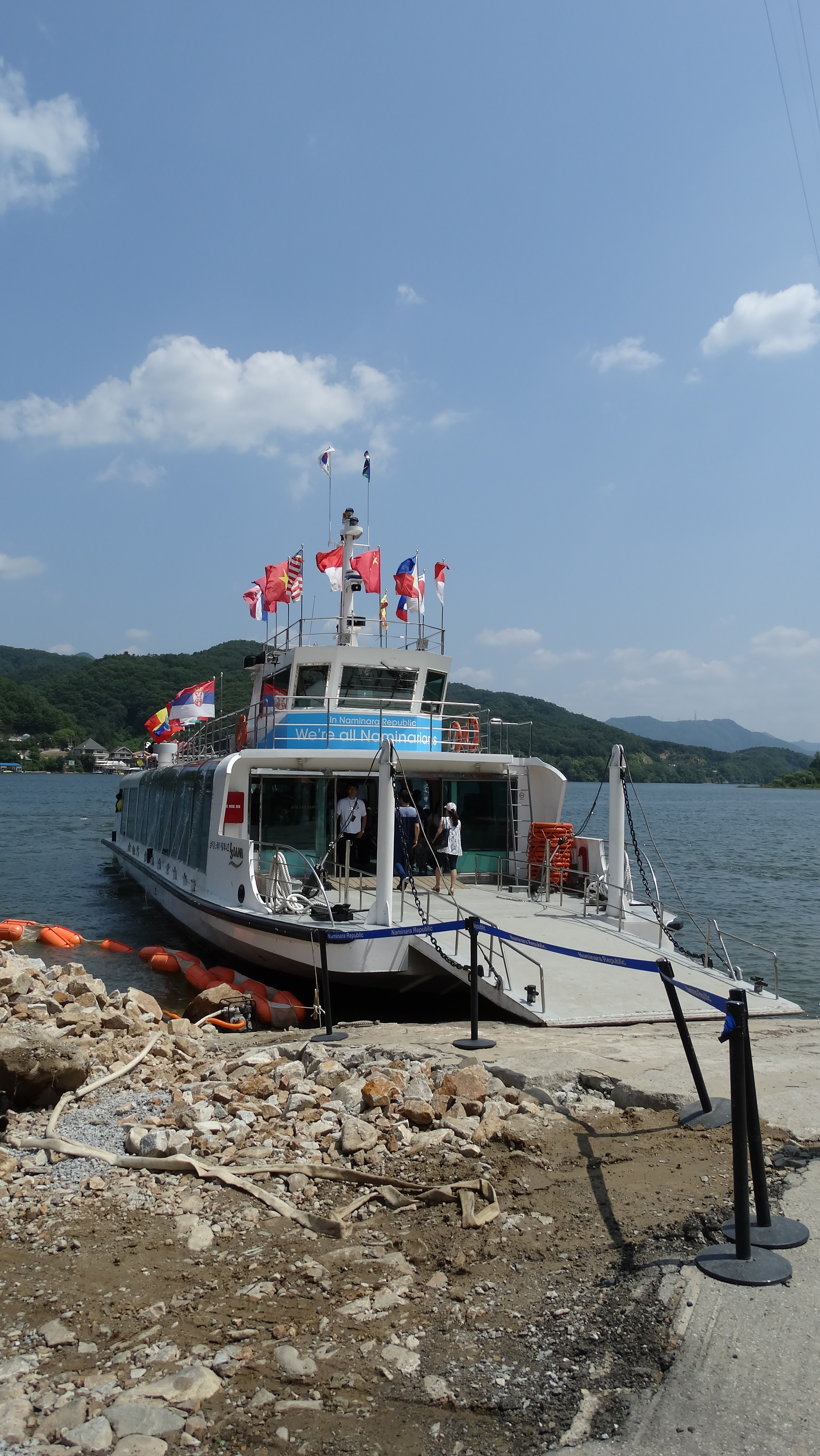

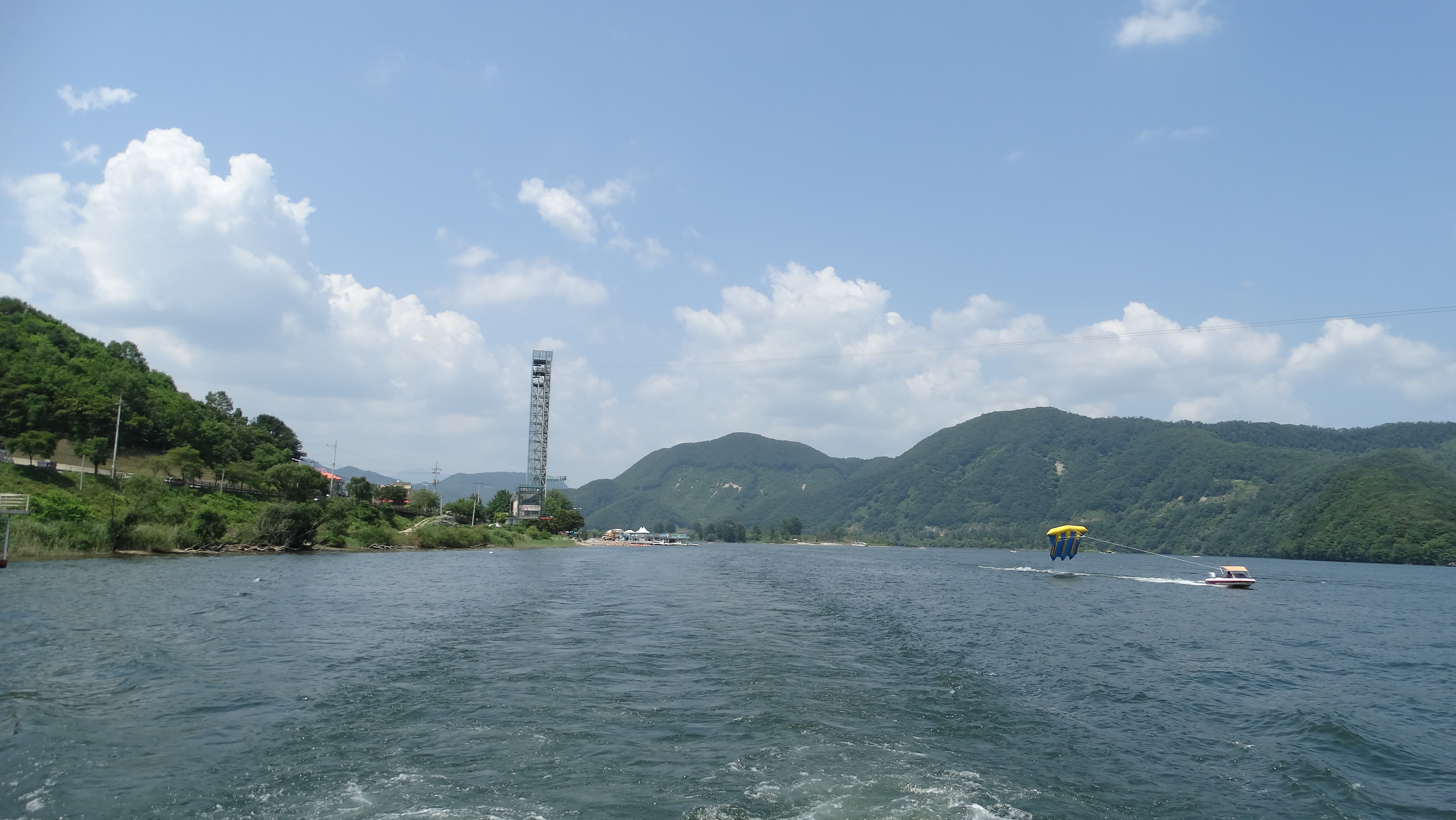
View north, with the zip line tower

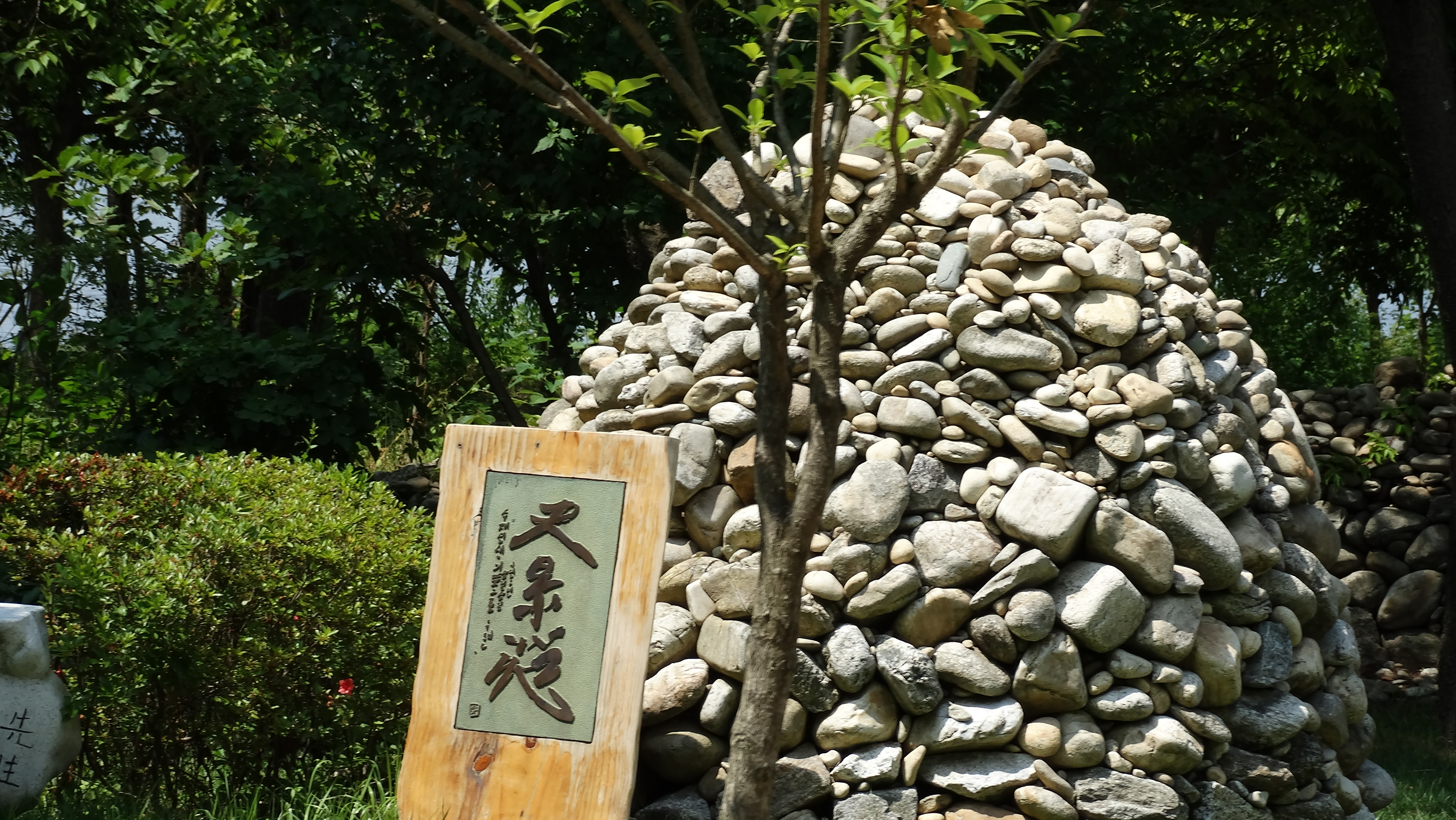

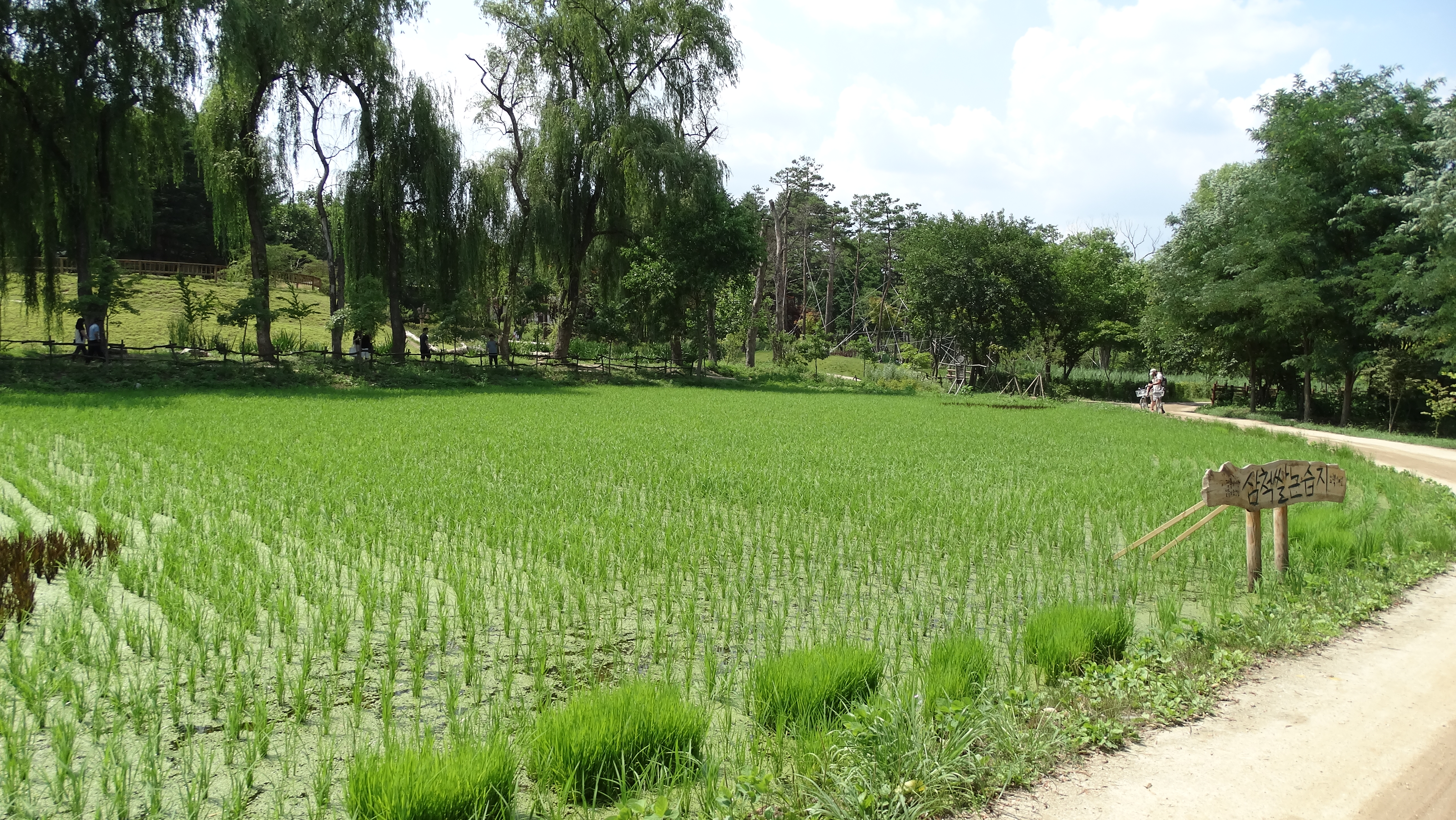

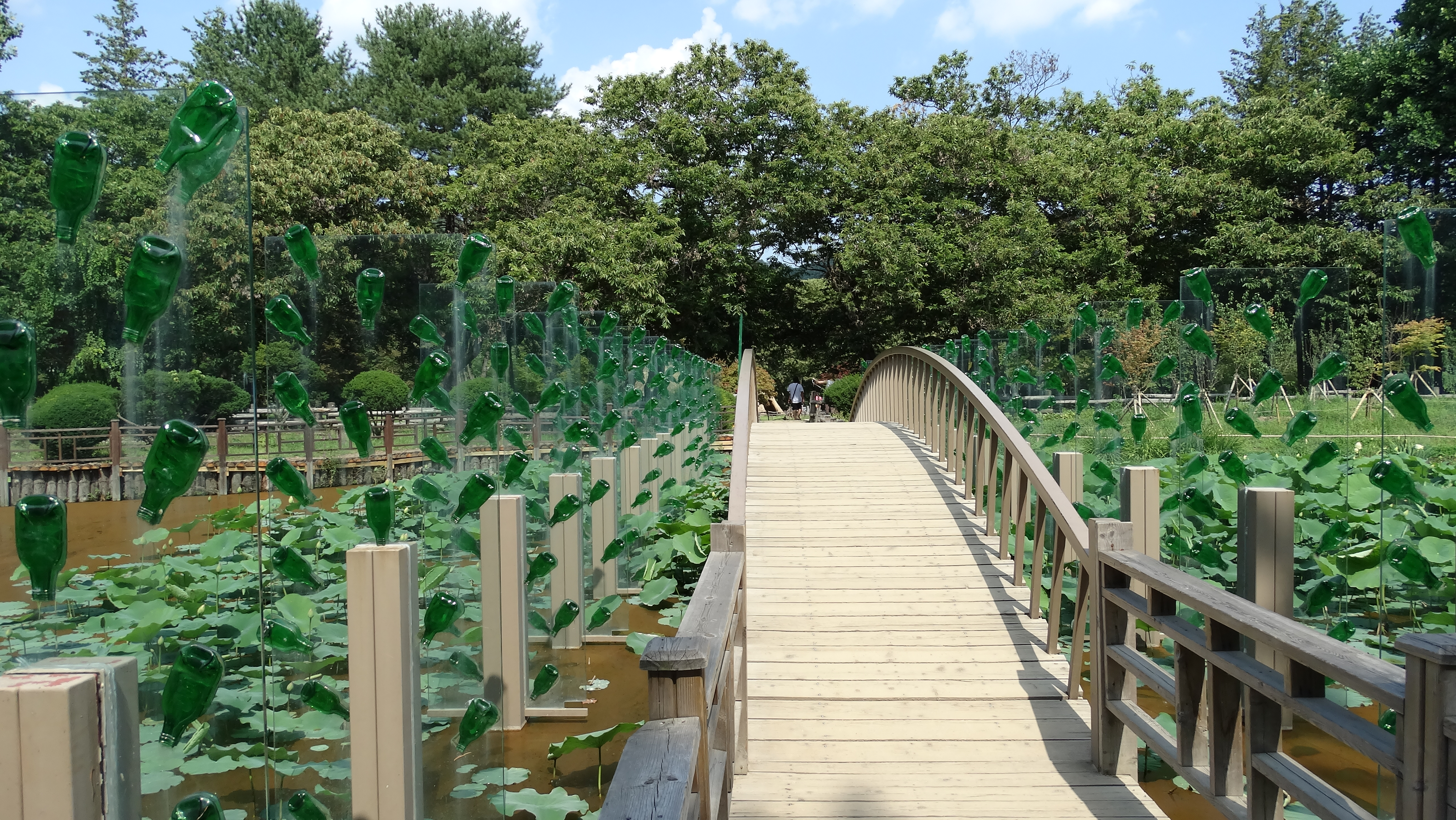

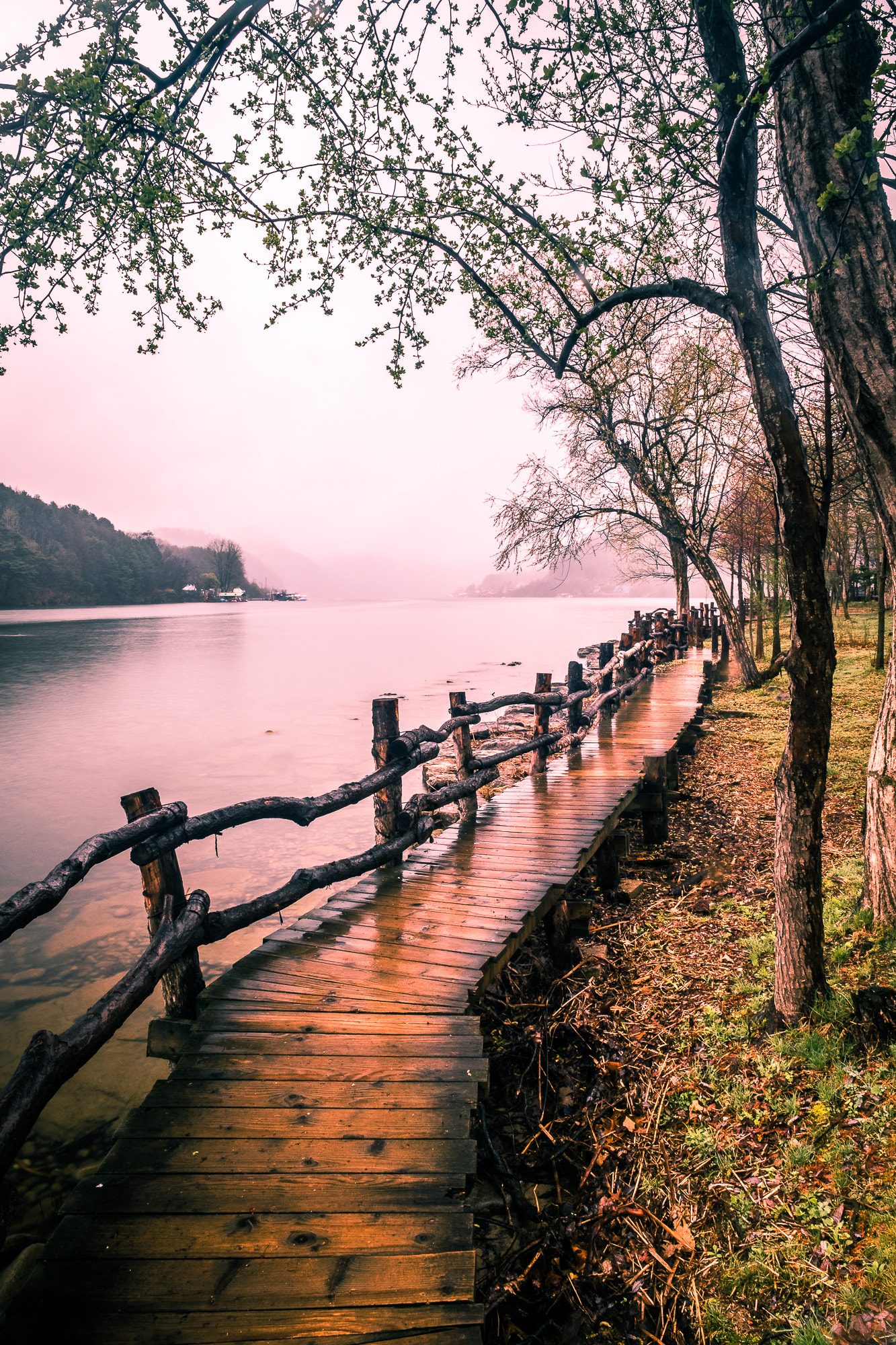

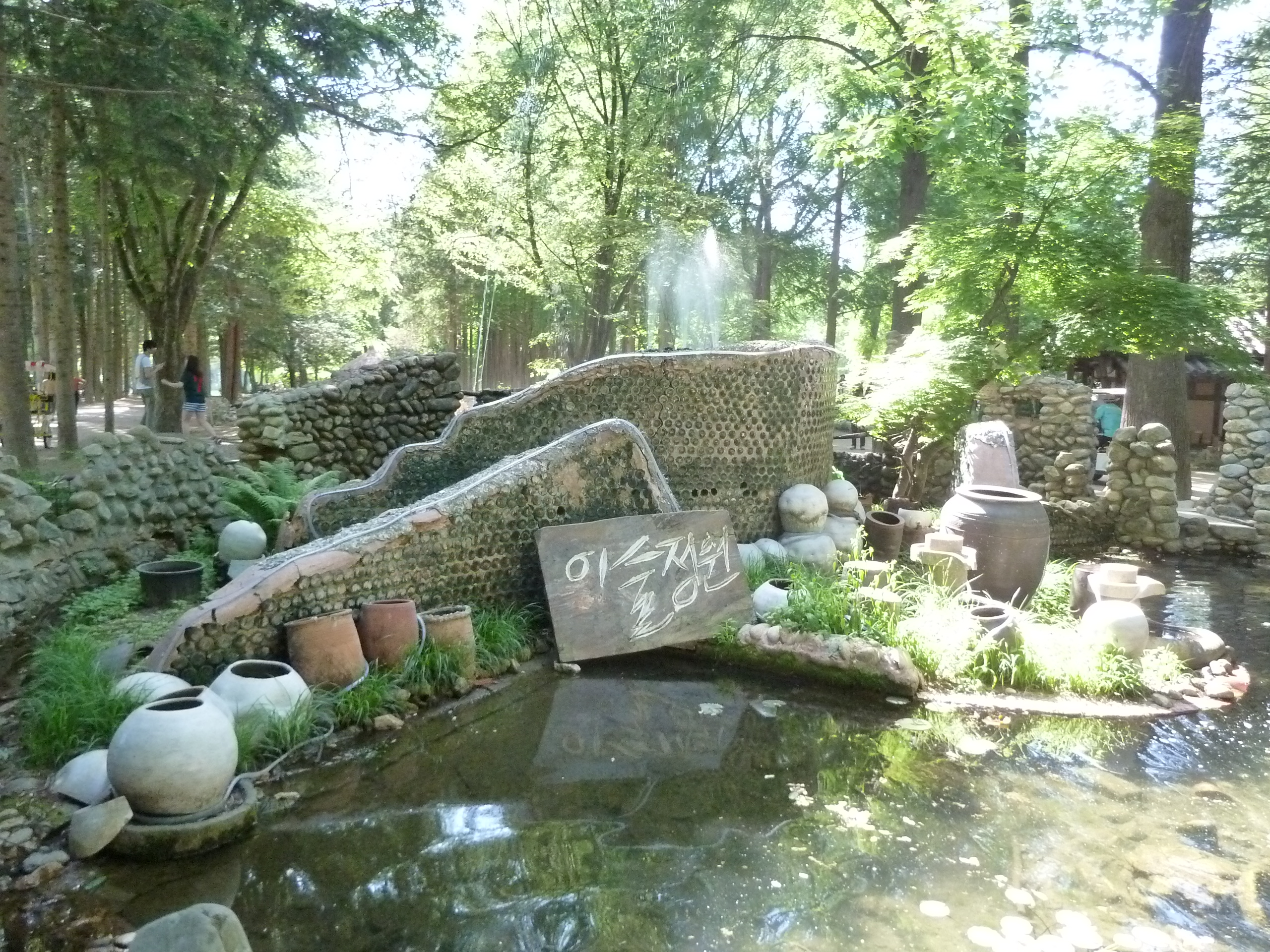
Soju sculpture

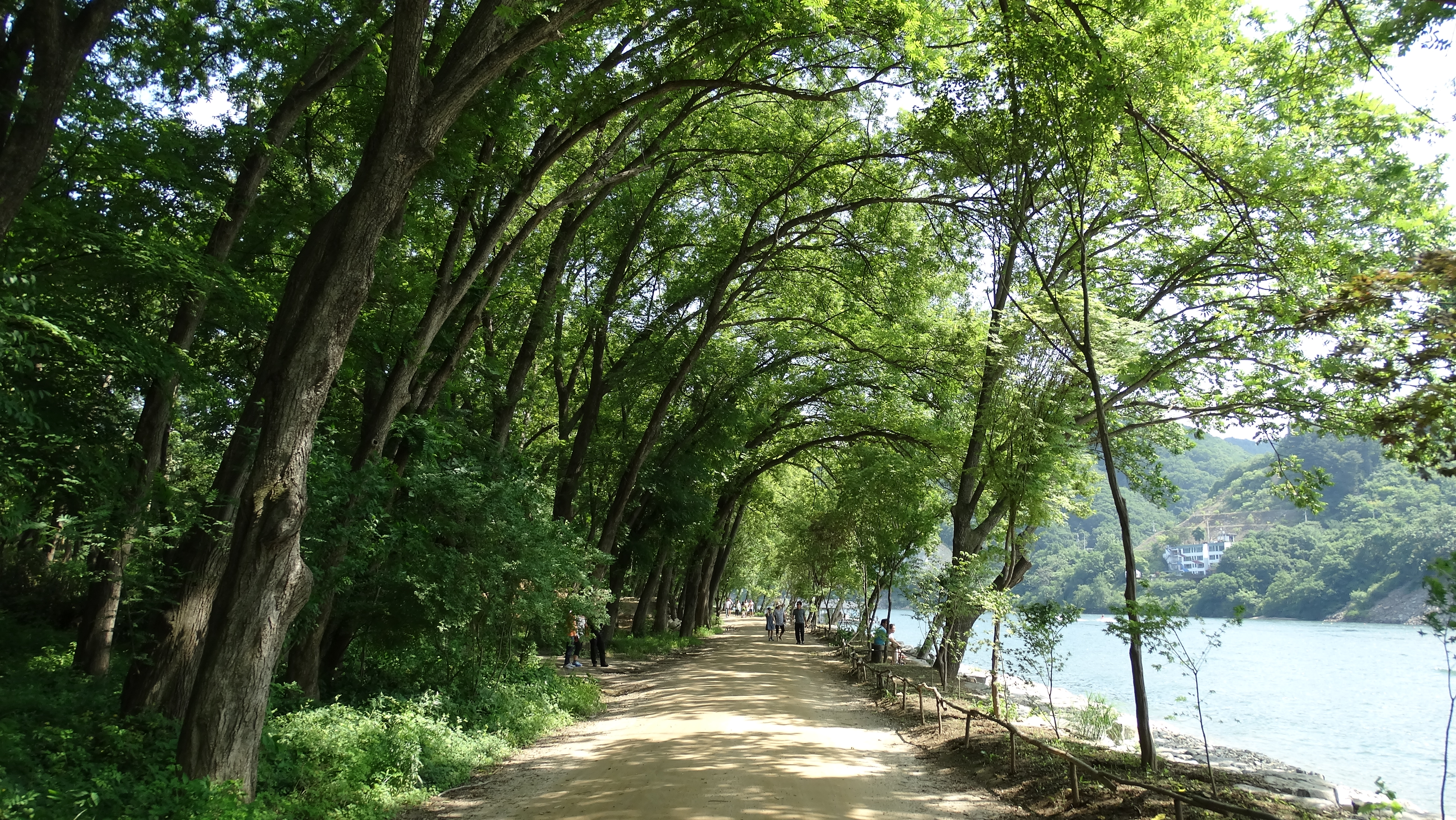

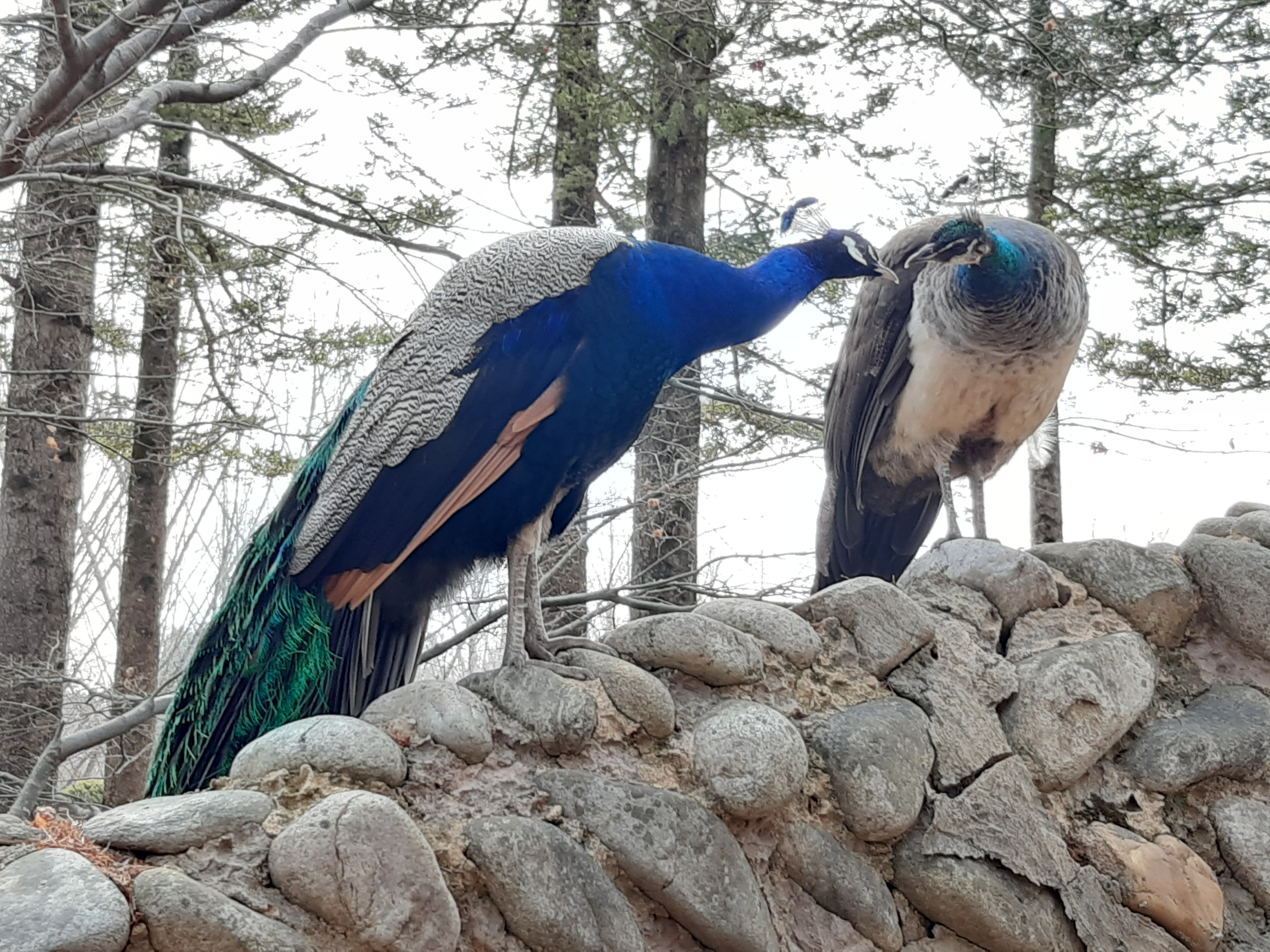
Peafowls
