= Chokdaebong =

Mountain in South Korea

Highest point
- Elevation: 1,125 m (3,691 ft)

Geography
- Location: South Korea

Korean name
- Hangul: 촉대봉
- Hanja: 燭臺峯
- RR: Chokdaebong
- MR: Ch'oktaebong

Chokdaebong (Korean: 촉대봉) is a mountain in South Korea. It sits on the boundary between Gapyeong County in Gyeonggi Province and Chuncheon in Gangwon Province. Chokdaebong has an elevation of 1,125 m (3,691 ft).

== See also ==
- List of mountains in Korea
