= Cheongusan =

Mountain in Gapyeong, South Korea

Coordinates: 37°47′N 127°25′E

Cheongwusan

Highest point
- Elevation: 619 m (2,031 ft)

Geography
- Location: South Korea

Korean name
- Hangul: 청우산
- Hanja: 靑雨山
- RR: Cheongusan
- MR: Ch'ŏngusan

Cheongwusan (Korean: 청우산) is a mountain in Gyeonggi Province, South Korea. It can be found in Gapyeong County. Cheongwusan has an elevation of 619 m (2,031 ft).

== See also ==
- List of mountains in Korea
