= Homyeongsan =

Mountain in Gyeonggi Province, South Korea

Highest point
- Elevation: 632 m (2,073 ft)

Geography
- Location: South Korea

Korean name
- Hangul: 호명산
- Hanja: 虎鳴山
- RR: Homyeongsan
- MR: Homyŏngsan

Homyeongsan (Korean: 호명산) is a mountain in Gapyeong County, Gyeonggi Province in South Korea. It has an elevation of 632 m (2,073 ft).

== See also ==
- List of mountains in Korea
