= Goraesan =

Mountain in Gyeonggi Province, South Korea

Highest point
- Elevation: 542.5 m (1,780 ft)
- Coordinates: 37°25′05″N 127°39′30″E

Geography
- Location: South Korea

Korean name
- Hangul: 고래산
- Hanja: 高崍山
- RR: Goraesan
- MR: Koraesan

Goraesan (Korean: 고래산) is a mountain in Gyeonggi Province, South Korea. Its area extends across Gapyeong County and Yeoju County. Goraesan has an elevation of 542.5 m (1,780 ft).

== See also ==
- List of mountains in Korea
