= Hwayasan =

Mountain in Gyeonggi Province, South Korea

Highest point
- Elevation: 755 m (2,477 ft)
- Coordinates: 37°40′N 127°26′E

Geography
- Location: South Korea

Korean name
- Hangul: 화야산
- Hanja: 禾也山
- RR: Hwayasan
- MR: Hwayasan

Hwayasan (Korean: 화야산) is a mountain in Gyeonggi Province, South Korea. Its area extends across Gapyeong County and Yangpyeong County. Hwayasan has an elevation of 755 m (2,477 ft).

== See also ==
- List of mountains in Korea
- Bborubong
