= Ppyorubong =

Mountain in South Korea

Highest point
- Elevation: 710 m (2,330 ft)
- Coordinates: 37.70492°N 127.42504°E

Geography
- Location: South Korea

Korean name
- Hangul: 뾰루봉
- RR: Ppyorubong
- MR: Ppyorubong

Ppyorubong (Korean: 뾰루봉) is a mountain of South Korea in Gapyeong that is connected to Hwayasan. It has an elevation of 710 metres.

== See also ==
- List of mountains of Korea
