= Bulgisan =

Mountain in South Korea

Coordinates: 37°48′N 127°27′E

Highest point
- Elevation: 610 m (2,000 ft)

Geography
- Location: South Korea

Korean name
- Hangul: 불기산
- Hanja: 佛岐山
- RR: Bulgisan
- MR: Pulgisan

Bulgisan (Korean: 불기산) is a mountain in Gyeonggi Province, South Korea. The mountain sits in Gapyeong County. Bulgisan has an elevation of 610 m (2,001 ft).

== See also ==
- List of mountains in Korea
