= Jugeumsan =

Mountain in South Korea

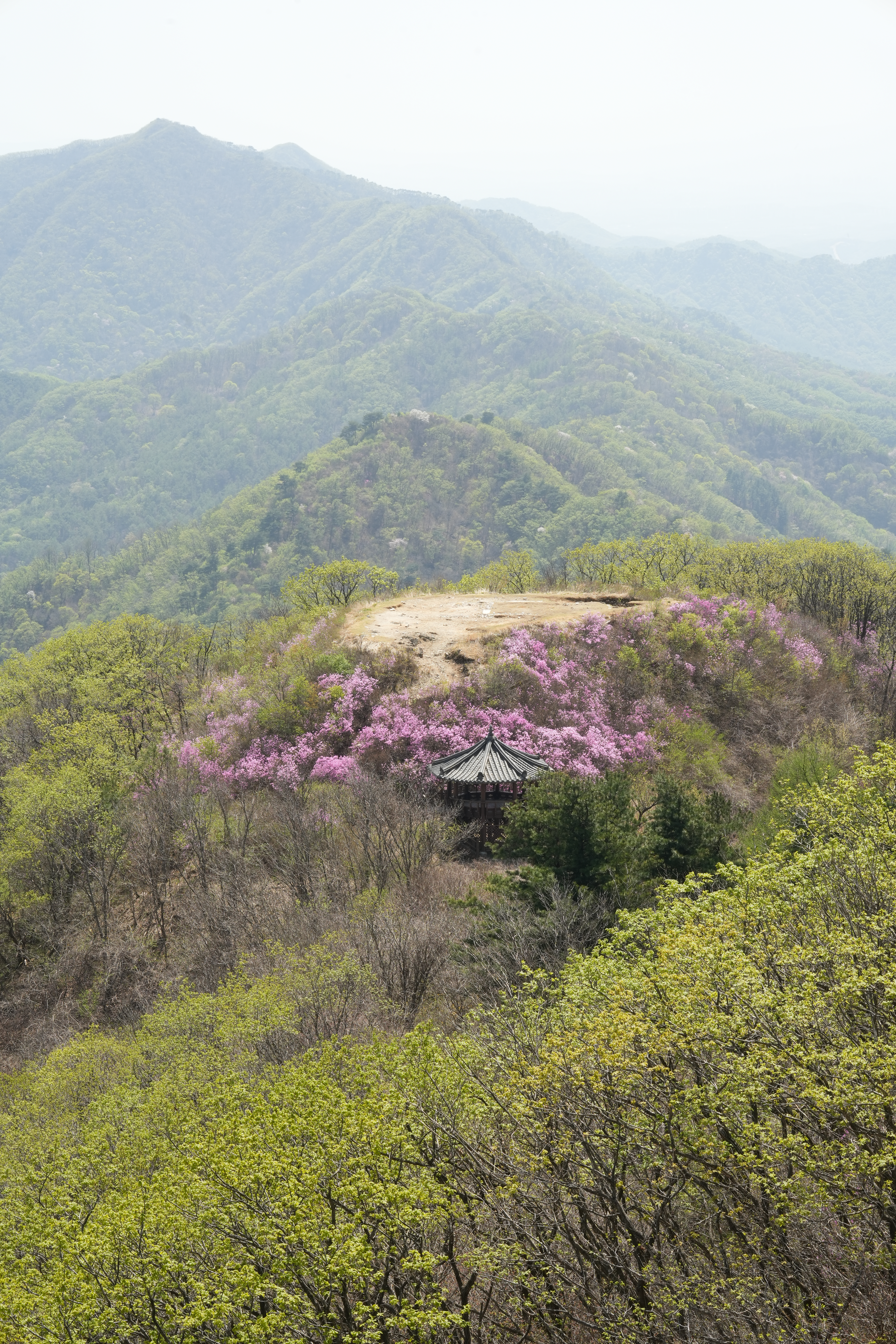

Highest point
- Elevation: 877.2 m (2,878 ft)
- Coordinates: 37°47′N 127°16′E

Geography
- Location: South Korea

Korean name
- Hangul: 주금산
- Hanja: 鑄錦山
- RR: Jugeumsan
- MR: Chugŭmsan

Jugeumsan (Korean: 주금산) is a mountain in Gyeonggi Province, South Korea. Its area extends across the cities of Pocheon, Namyangju, and Gapyeong County. Jugeumsan has an elevation of 877.2 m (2,878 ft).

== Gallery ==
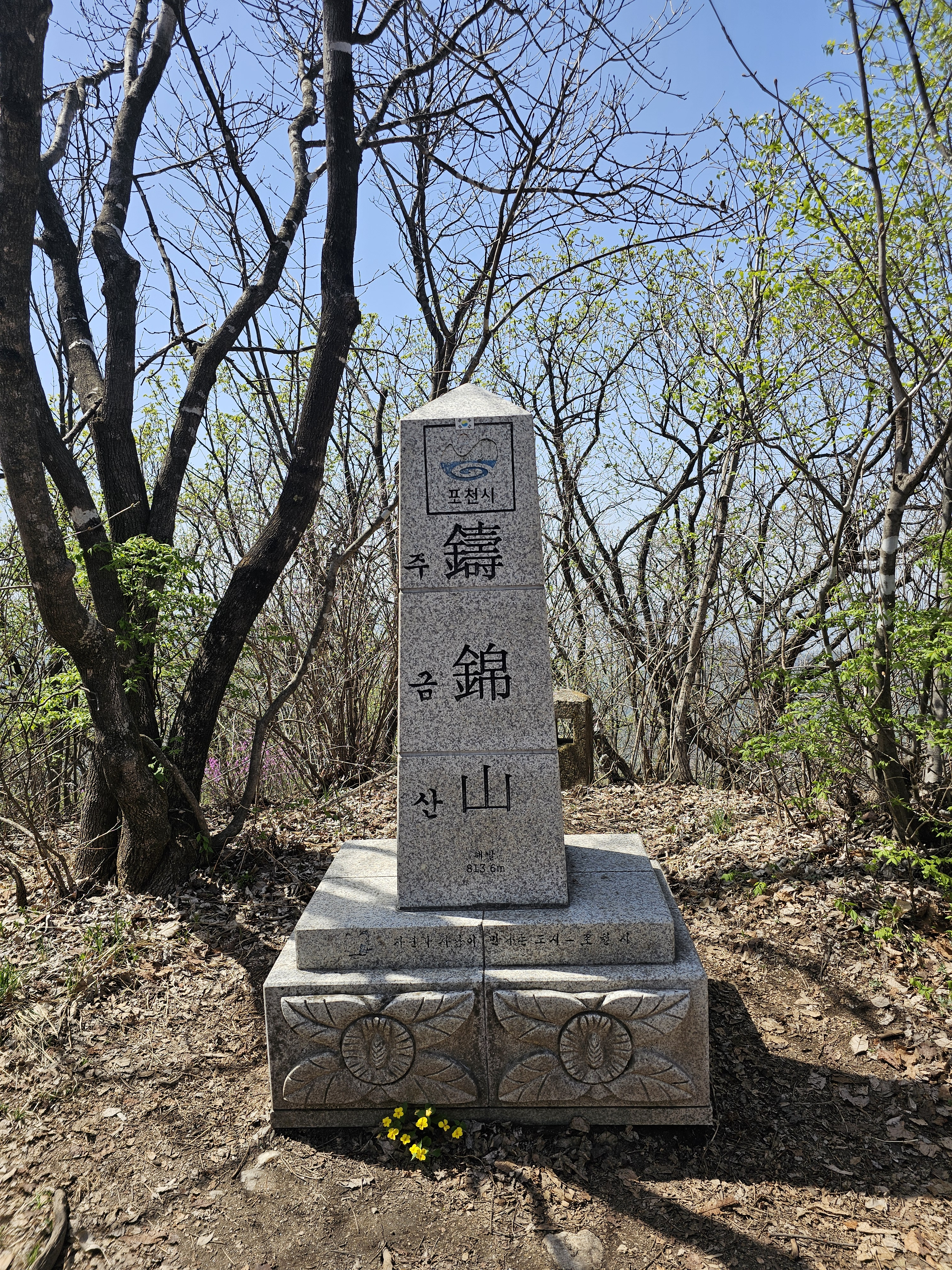

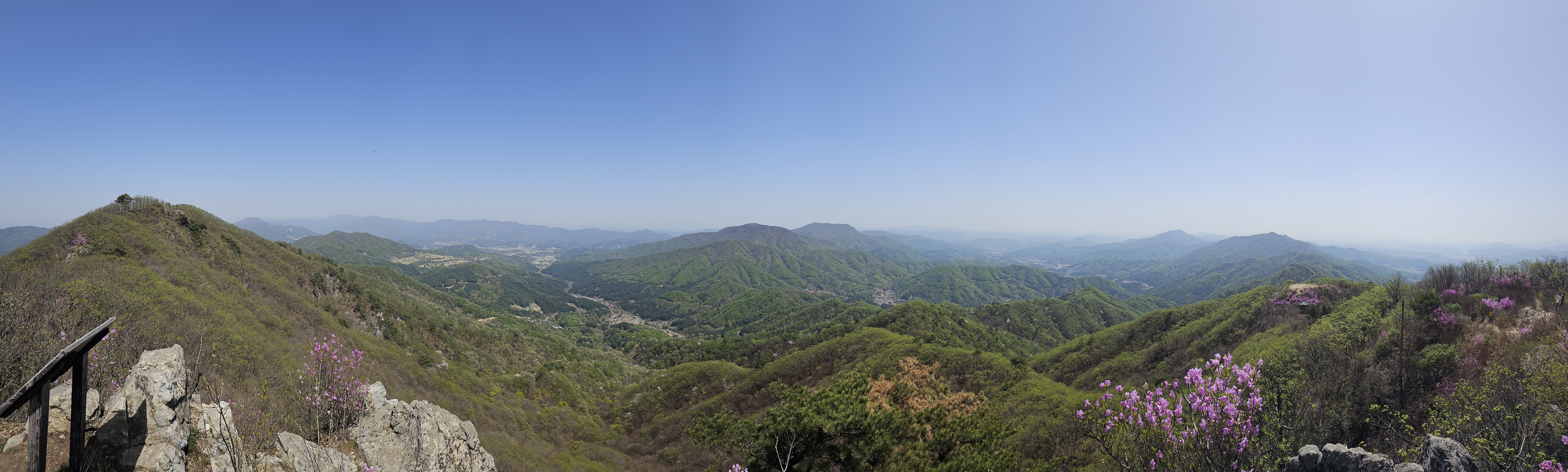

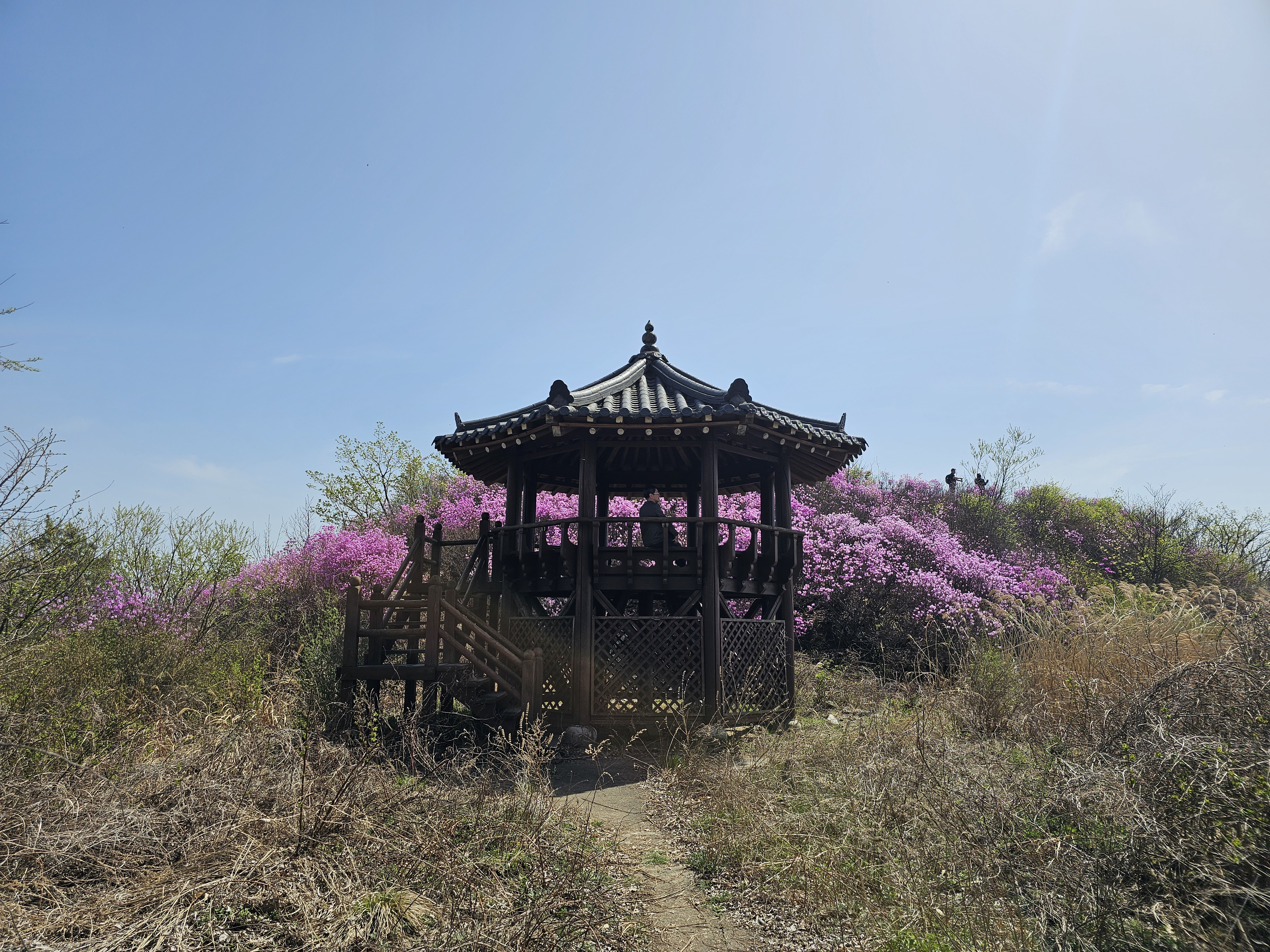

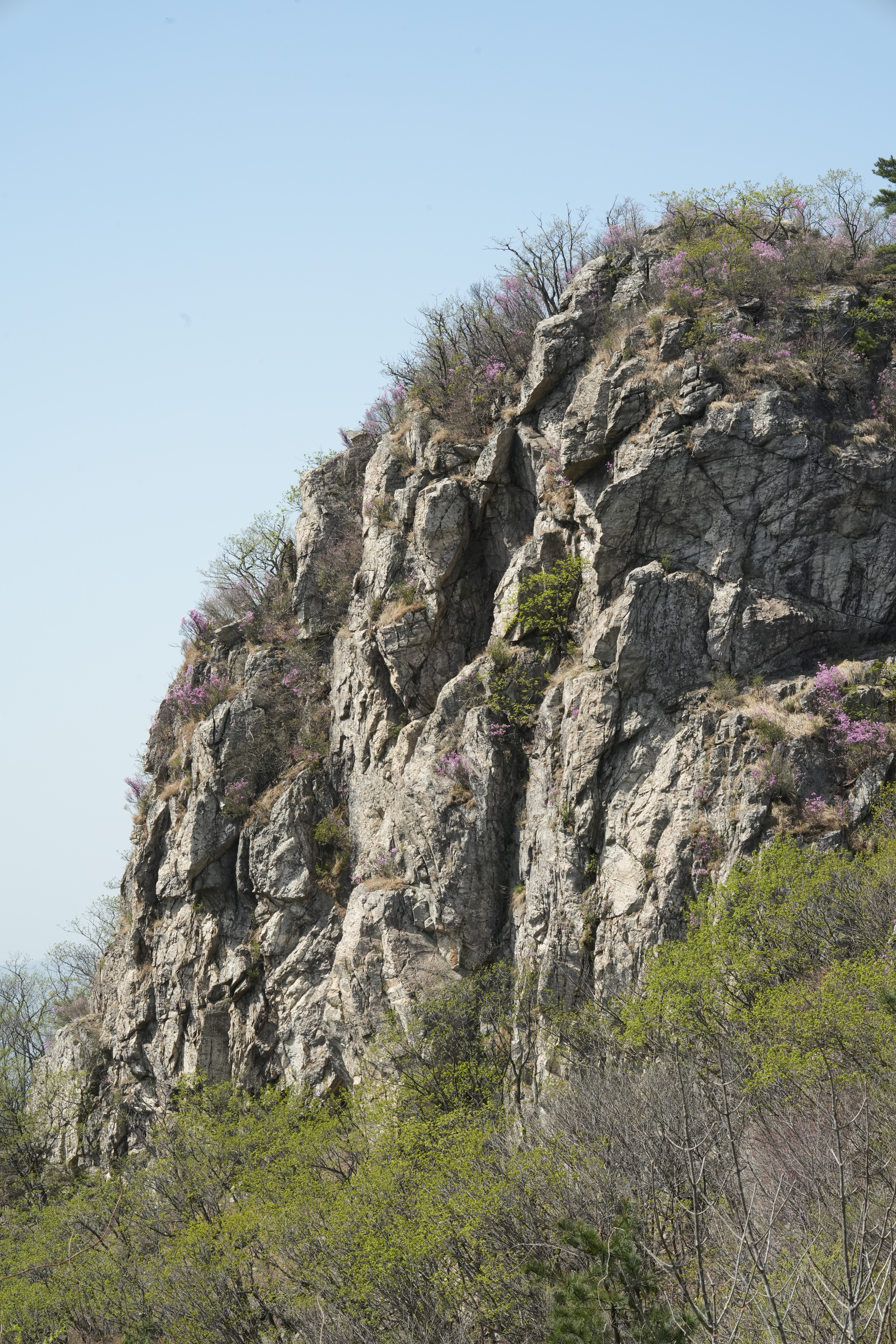

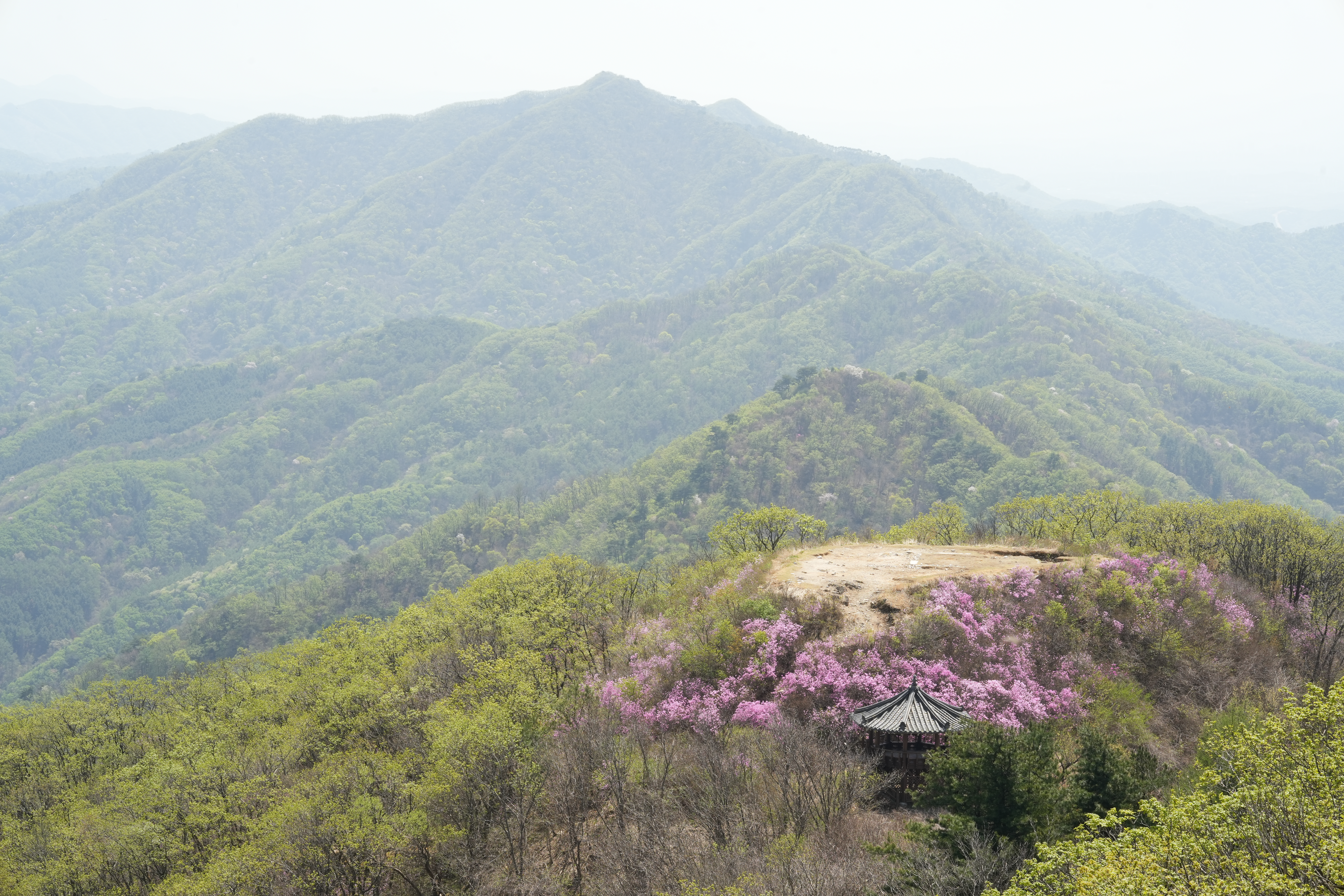

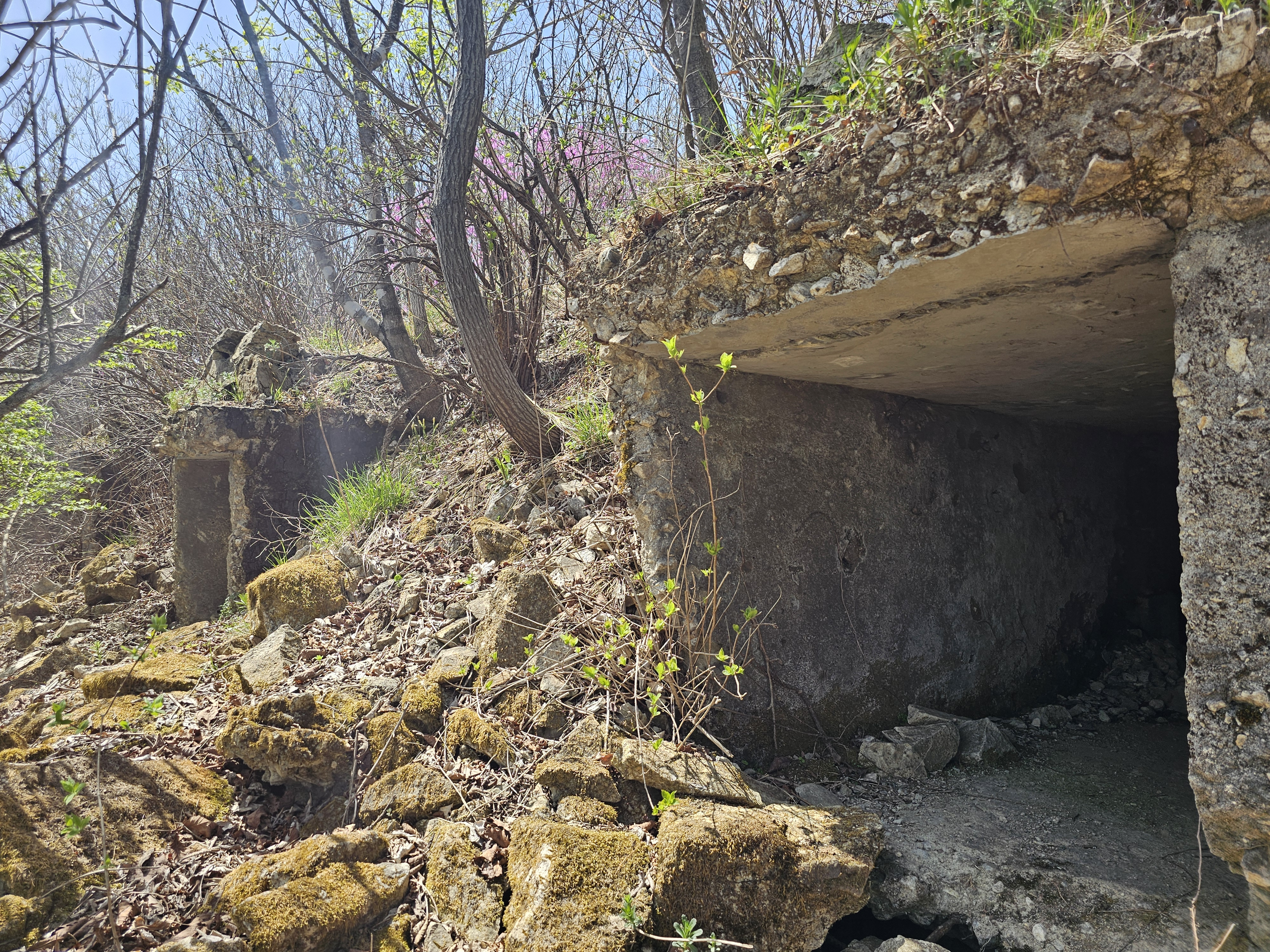

== See also ==
- List of mountains in Korea
