= Gyegwansan =

Mountain in South Korea

Highest point
- Elevation: 665.4 m (2,183 ft)
- Coordinates: 37°53′N 127°37′E

Geography
- Location: South Korea

Korean name
- Hangul: 계관산
- Hanja: 鷄冠山
- RR: Gyegwansan
- MR: Kyegwansan

Gyegwansan (Korean: 계관산) is a mountain in South Korea. Its area extends over Gapyeong County in Gyeonggi Province and Chuncheon, the capital of Gangwon Province. Gyegwansan has an elevation of 665.4 m (2,183 ft).

== See also ==
- List of mountains in Korea
