= Gangssibong =

Mountain in Gyeonggi, South Korea

Highest point
- Elevation: 830 m (2,720 ft)
- Coordinates: 37.968772°N 127.38508°E

Geography
- Location: South Korea

Korean name
- Hangul: 강씨봉
- Hanja: 姜氏峰
- RR: Gangssibong
- MR: Kangssibong

Gangssibong (Korean: 강씨봉) is a mountain in Gyeonggi Province, South Korea. Its sits on the boundary between Pocheon and Gapyeong County. Gangssibong has an elevation of 830 m (2,723 ft).

== See also ==
- List of mountains in Korea
