= Gunamusan =

Mountain in Gapyeong, South Korea

Highest point
- Elevation: 600 m (2,000 ft)

Geography
- Location: South Korea

Korean name
- Hangul: 구나무산
- Hanja: 구나무山
- RR: Gunamusan
- MR: Kunamusan

Gunamusan (Korean: 구나무산) is a mountain in Gyeonggi Province, South Korea. Its area extends across Gapyeong County. Gunamusan has an elevation of 600 m (1,969 ft).

== See also ==
- List of mountains in Korea
