= Gadeoksan =

Mountain in Gapyeong, South Korea

Highest point
- Elevation: 858 m (2,815 ft)
- Coordinates: 37°56′25″N 127°36′46″E

Geography
- Location: South Korea

Korean name
- Hangul: 가덕산
- Hanja: 加德山
- RR: Gadeoksan
- MR: Kadŏksan

Gadeoksan (Korean: 가덕산) is a mountain in South Korea. Its area extends across Gapyeong County, Gyeonggi Province and Chuncheon in Gangwon Province. Gadeoksan has an elevation of 858 m (2,815 ft).

== See also ==
- List of mountains in Korea
