= Cheongpyeong Dam =

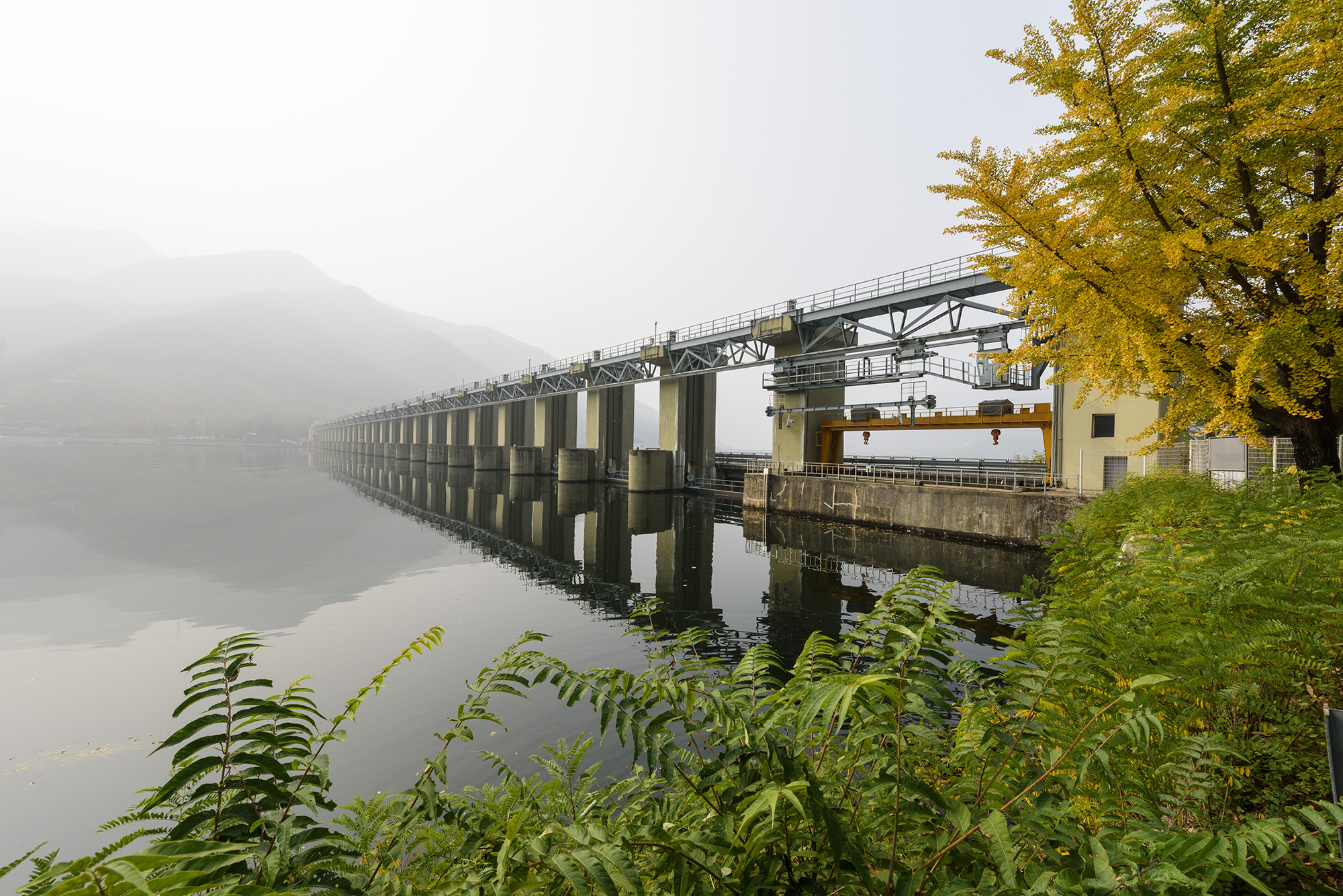

- Location within South Korea
- Official name: 청평댐
- Country: South Korea
- Location: Gyeonggi Province
- Coordinates: 37.7232°N 127.42096°E
- Status: Operational
- Construction began: 1943
- Owners: Korea Hydro & Nuclear Power Co.

Dam and spillways
- Type of dam: Gravity dam
- Impounds: Bukhan River
- Height: 31 m (102 feet)
- Length: 407 m (1,335 feet)

Cheongpyeong Dam (Korean: 청평댐) is a dam located in Gyeonggi Province. The dam is located 49 m (160 feet) above sea level, about 40 km (25 miles) from Seoul.

Located on the Bukhan River in the southwest of Gapyeong County, it was built in 1943 as the Cheongpyeong hydroelectric power plant. This power plant has an installed capacity of 79,600 kW and an average output of 35,000 kW.

As a power generation dam that mainly produces electricity, it is owned by the Korea Hydro & Nuclear Power Co., Ltd., not the Korea Water Resources Corporation. Electricity produced here is transmitted to Bupyeong District, and although electric power is important, it plays also a large role in regulating the water level of the river. The last unit producing energy was commissioned in 2011; as of 2012 it has 4 units.

Transportation to Seoul attracts many tourists from Gyeongin. In particular, Cheongpyeong Dam has a popular water ski resort, and an American-run foreigner's amusement park even more famous inside the dam.

The landscape around Cheongpyeong Dam is mainly hilly. Cheongpyeong Dam is located down in a valley. The highest point nearby is 418 m (1,371 feet), 1.1 km (0.68 miles) south of Cheongpyeong Dam. Around Cheongpyeong Dam it is quite densely populated, with 78 inhabitants per square kilometre (200 inhabitants per square mile). The nearest major community is Hwado, 12.8 km (8 miles) southwest of Cheongpyeong Dam. In the area around Cheongpyeong Dam, there are mainly mixed forests.

== Climate ==
The area is mainly continental. The annual average temperature in the area is 10 °C (50 °F). The warmest month is August, when the average temperature is 22 °C (72 °F), and the coldest is January, with −6 °C (21 °F). The average annual rainfall is 1,581 mm (62 inches). The wettest month is July, with an average of 457 mm (18 inches) of precipitation, and the driest is January, with 28 mm (1 inch) of rain.

Cheongpyeong Dam

Climate chart (precipitation, max. and min. temperature)
J	F	M	A	M	J	J	A	S	O	N	D
28 −3 −9	43 1 −5	44 8 0	120 17 4	84 20 12	115 24 17	457 23 18	300 25 20	199 20 15	73 15 9	67 7 2	51 −1 −6
- █ Average max. and min. temperatures in °C
- █ Precipitation totals in mm
Imperial conversion
J	F	M	A	M	J	J	A	S	O	N	D
1.1 27 16	1.7 34 23	1.7 46 32	4.7 63 39	3.3 68 54	4.5 75 63	18 73 64	12 77 68	7.8 68 59	2.9 59 48	2.6 45 36	2 30 21
- █ Average max. and min. temperatures in °F
- █ Precipitation totals in inches
