= Garden of Morning Calm =

Arboretum in Gyeonggi Province, South Korea

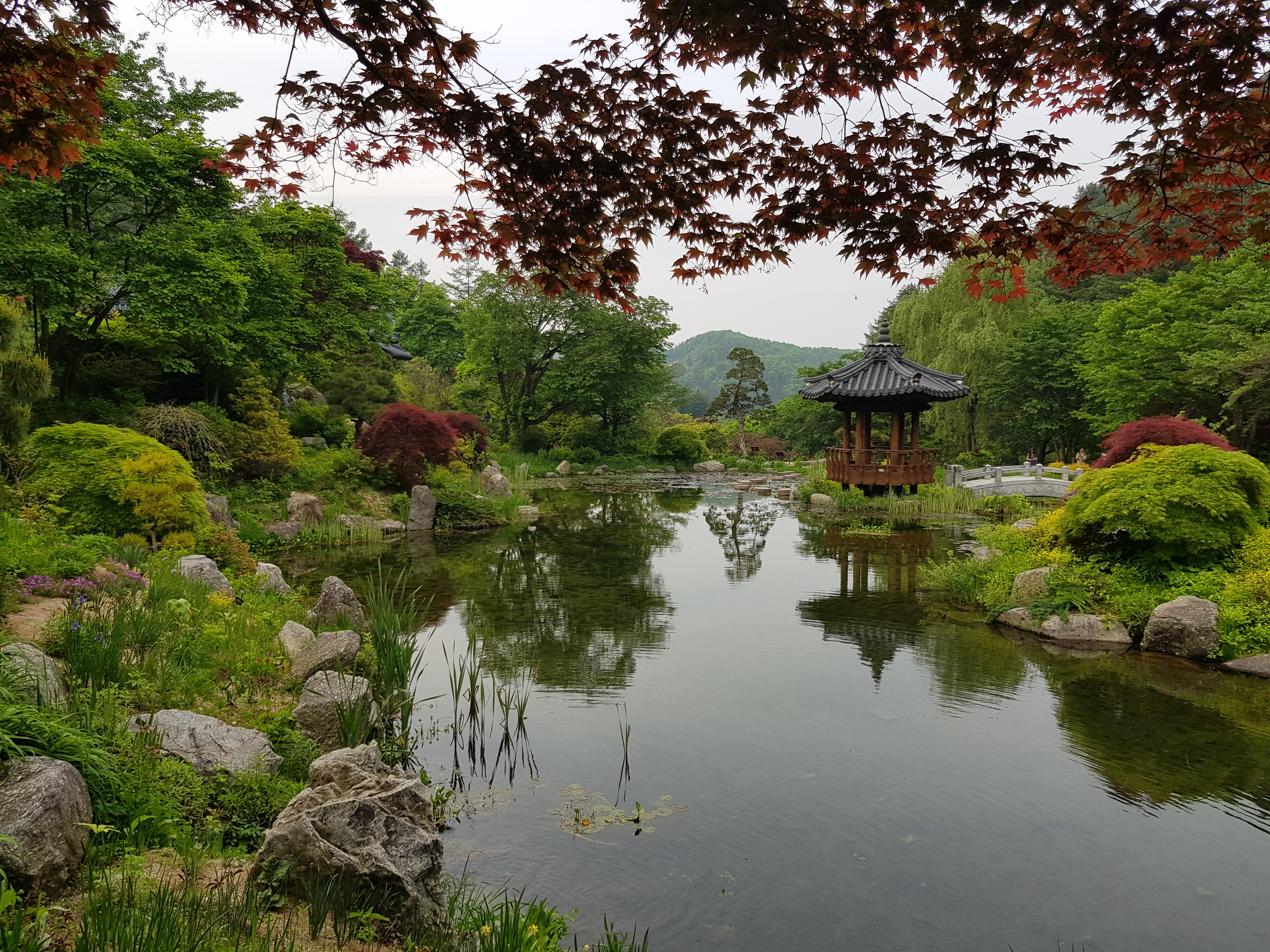

- Location within South Korea
- Location: Gapyeong, Gyeonggi
- Coordinates: 37°44′34″N 127°21′07″E
- Area: 0.33 km^{2} (0.13 sq mi)
- Created: 1996
- Website: morningcalm.co.kr

Korean name
- Hangul: 아침고요수목원
- Hanja: 아침고요樹木園
- RR: Achim goyo sumogwon
- MR: Ach'im koyo sumogwŏn

The Garden of Morning Calm (Korean: 아침고요수목원) is an arboretum in Gapyeong, Gyeonggi Province, South Korea. It is a popular tourist attraction in Gapyeong. Its name is a reference to a longtime nickname for Korea: "land of the morning calm". The park aims to showcase Korean gardening and artistic concepts.

On 330,000 m^{2}, it houses 5,000 species of plants. There are different festivals in this garden, especially in winter with a light festival.

The garden was created by Han San-kyung of Sahmyook University. The garden was first conceived of in 1992. Land was purchased for it in 1994. Its location was previously a barren stone lot, which had been cleared via slash-and-burn agricultural practices. Han and his wife designed and labored on the garden extensively themselves. At one point, while experiencing financial difficulties, that they sold off their house and lived in a small home on the garden's property.

The garden first opened to the public on May 11, 1996, with ten themed sections. Additional sections have since been continually added to the garden. As of 2024, it has 22 sections.

== Gallery ==
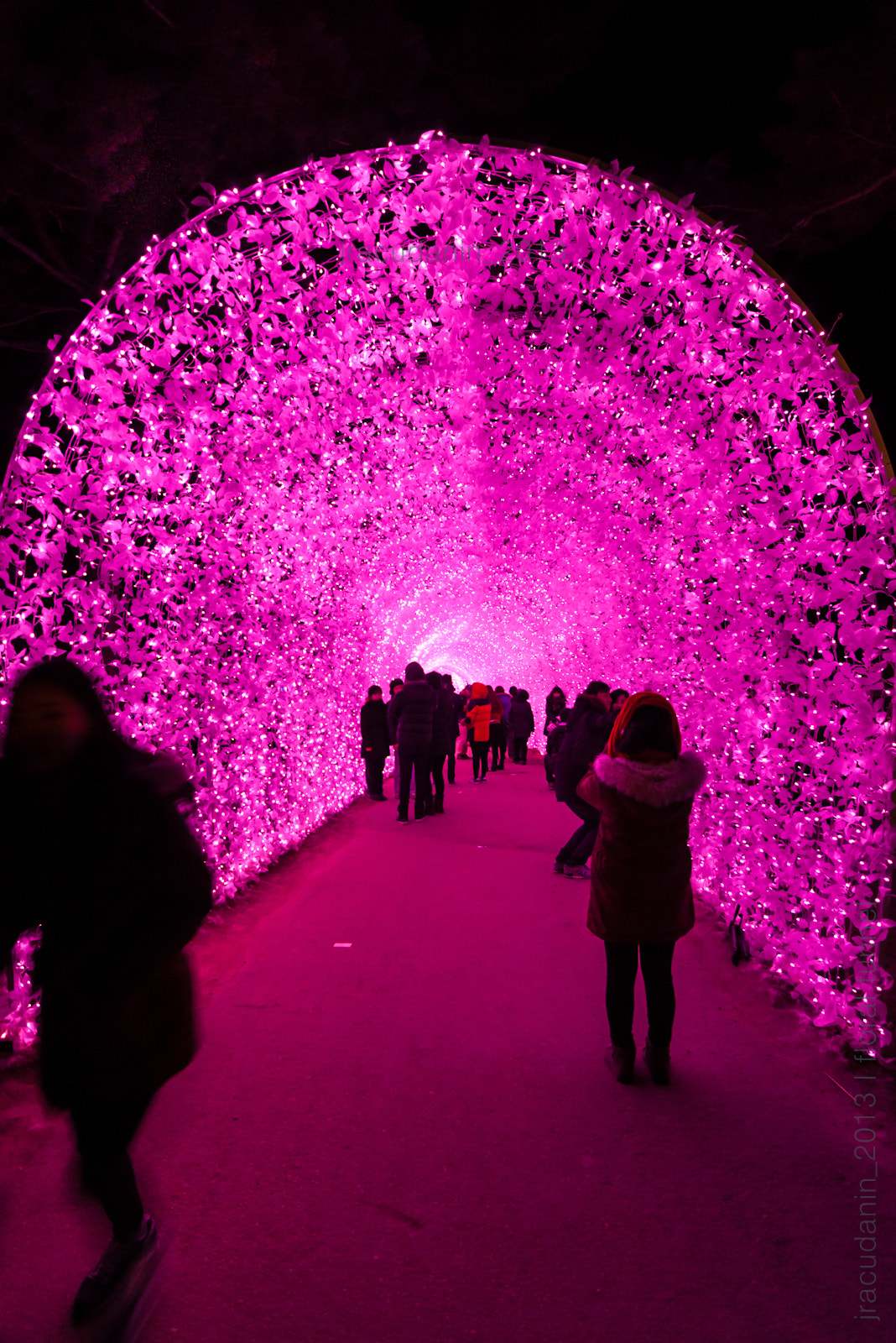
A floral tunnel illuminated at night (2014)

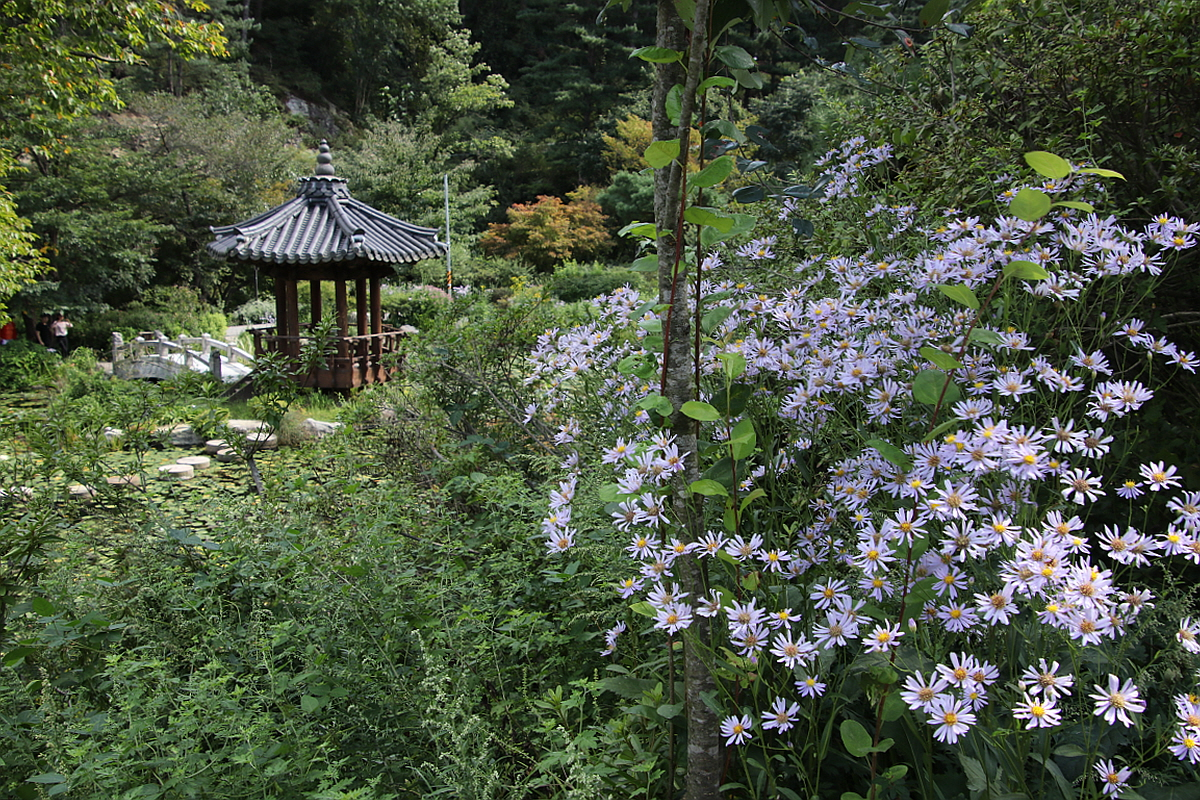
Flowers and a pavilion in the distance (2019)

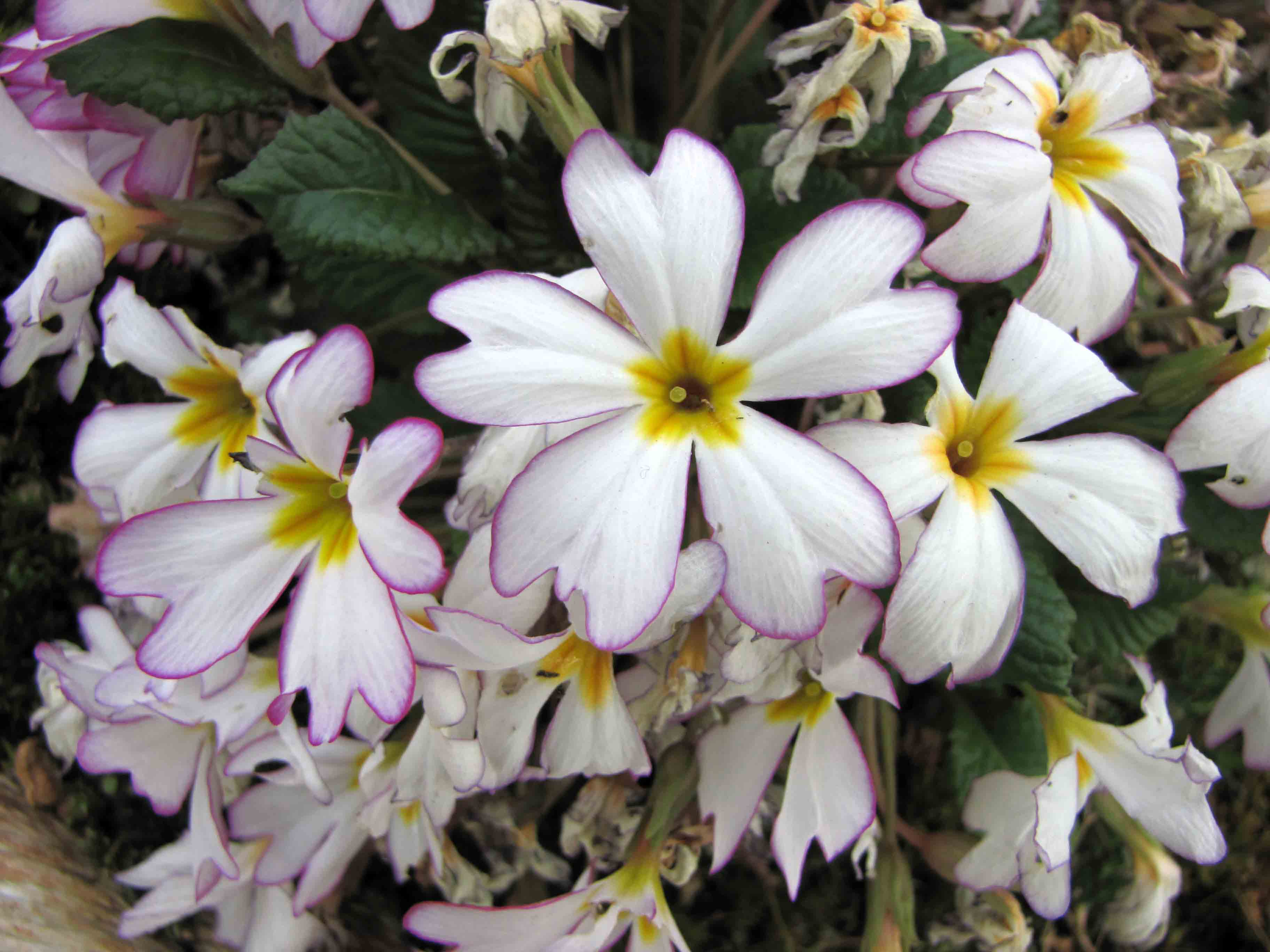
Primula sinensis flowers (2017)

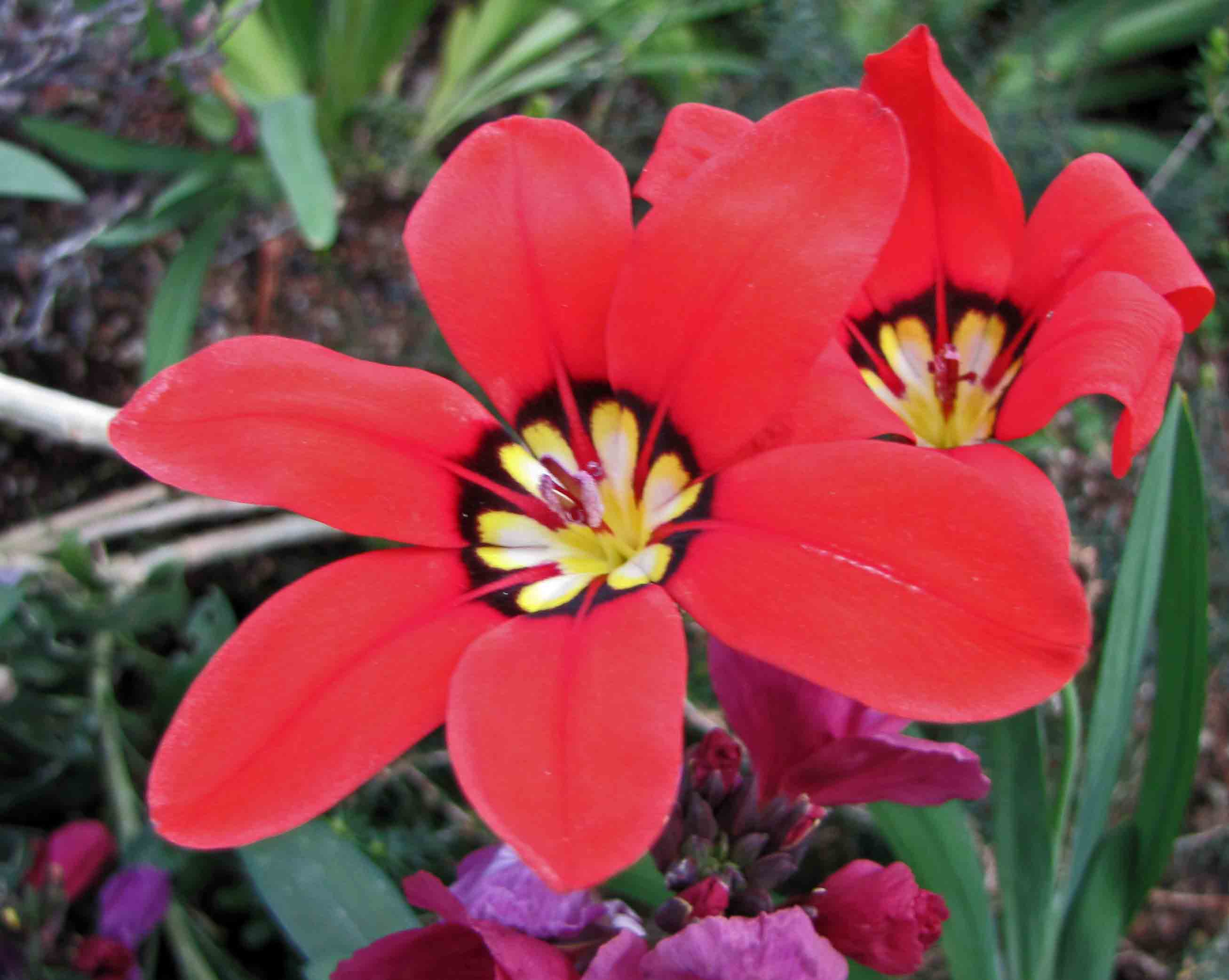
Sparaxis tricolor flowers (2017)

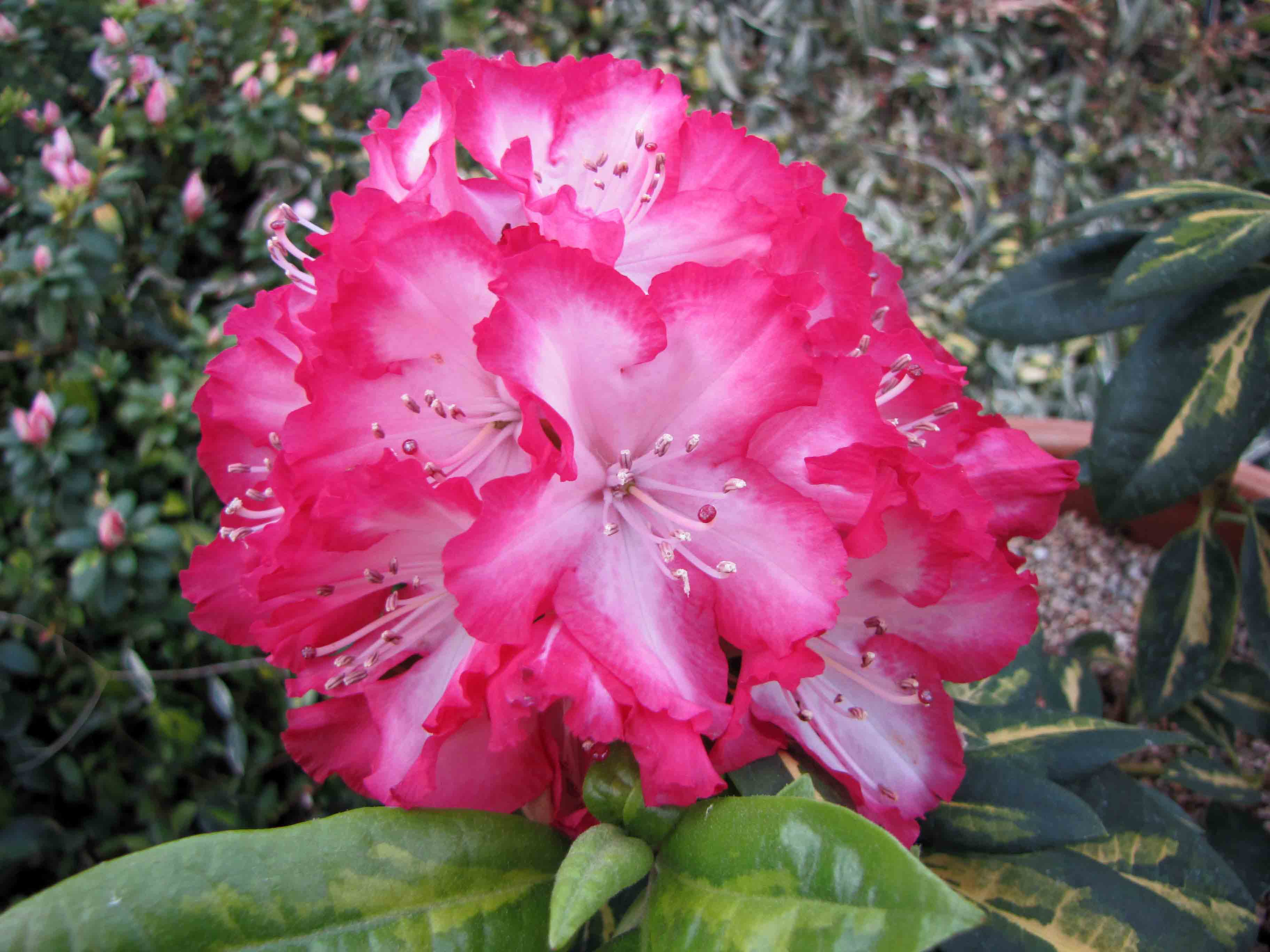
Rhododendron brachycarpum flowers (2017)
