= Gungmangbong (Gyeonggi) =

Mountain in South Korea

Highest point
- Elevation: 1,168 m (3,832 ft)

Geography
- Location: South Korea

Korean name
- Hangul: 국망봉
- Hanja: 國望峰
- RR: Gungmangbong
- MR: Kungmangbong

Gungmangbong (Korean: 국망봉) is a mountain in Gyeonggi Province, South Korea. Its area extends across Gapyeong County and the city Pocheon. Gungmangbong has an elevation of 1,168 m (3,832 ft).

== See also ==
- List of mountains in Korea
