= CheongShim International Academy Model United Nations =

- 청심모의유엔회의
- Abbreviation: CSIAMUN
- Formation: 2009
- Purpose: Simulation of United Nations as a Model United Nations
- Official language: English
- Parent organization: CheongShim International Academy
- Website: csiamun.org

CheongShim International Academy Model United Nations (CSIAMUN; Korean: 청심모의유엔회의) is an annually held Model United Nations hosted at and supported by CheongShim International Academy. It has been held since 2009. The conference itself lasts for two days and three nights. The conference is divided into a middle school and a high school division. In 2013, the topics included development of terrorism prevention methods, solutions for the scarcity of natural resources in the North Pole.

The delegates for the conference participates from various areas and countries around the world, including South Korea, Hong Kong, India, Bangladesh, China, Japan, and Canada in 2024. Typically, there are about 160 delegates participating in the conference.

== History ==
CSIAMUN has been annually held since 2009. As of 2023, it had been held a total of 11 times. The average number of participants is about two hundred. CSIAMUN claims that it has been one of the most internationally diverse Model United Nations in South Korea since 2009.

== Conference ==
=== Model United Nations ===
CSIAMUN is divided into a middle school and a high school division. As of 2013, topics in the middle school division included solutions to the natural resource crisis in the North Pole and protection of women's rights including the honor killing in the Muslim world. Topics in the high school division included a proposal for an establishment of an overseeing institution of the development in Africa. The entire conference lasts for two days and three nights. There is a cultural exchange program and a dance party on the second night. The entire program is held in English. As of 2012, the total cost was 100,000 Won (about 95 dollars) There has also been a program of touring the culture of Korea, which has been credited with increasing awareness of the culture of Korea

Since it is held at CheongShim International Academy, its educational philosophy of altruism, creativity, and global leadership is applied.

=== Participants ===
As of 2013, there were 50 delegates from CheongShim International Academy, 60 from various regions in South Korea, and 50 from other countries in Asia. The other countries and regions include Hong Kong, China, Japan, Taiwan, India, Bangladesh and Canada.

=== Affiliation ===
The conference is affiliated with the organization Round Square.
