= Openowledge =

South Korean educational website

- 오픈놀리지
- The official logo for Openowledge
- Founder: Yu, Jin-Woo
- Type: NGO
- Legal status: active
- Purpose: Online Knowledge Sharing
- Professional title: 오픈놀리지:대한민국을 밝히는 지식나눔 플랫폼
- Location: 부산시 북구 화명동 2306 717-803
- Official language: Korean, English
- Staff: 8
- Volunteers: 40
- Website: http://openowledge.com/opencourse/
- Formerly called: Khan Academy Korea

Openowledge (Korean: 오픈놀리지) is an educational and nonprofit organization managed by students of CheongShim International Academy. The project was launched in January 2013 by the founder Jin-Woo Yu. The stated mission is to "allow students in South Korea to easily learn and study the lectures on their website.

The courses on the site includes videos translated from Khan Academy as well as those originally created by students. The subjects include: Calculus, Western Philosophy, Problems in Economics, and neuroscience. The total number of views is estimated to be about 26,300.

== History ==
One of the founders, Jin-Woo Yu, was inspired by a news article which introduced Khan Academy. He stated that the concept of Openowledge was created from a desire to create a translated and better-organized site. Another member stated that the concept of Korean subtitles arose from her own experience with Khan Academy. In 2012, Jin-Woo Yu and Myung-Gun Seo created the organization Khan Academy Korea. Khan Academy Korea had a project to translate Khan Academy videos. The project was extended into the current Openowledge project.

The first rough form of the organization began on the beginning of 2013 with founder Yu Jin-Woo and two others. At least one advertisement appeared on November 22, 2013. In January 2013,'Openowledge' was first created as a high school club. The founders only consisted of second-year high school students in CheongShim International Academy. The current site began operating in May 2013 as a beta version for about a month. Openowledge started operating as an actual service on July 16, 2013.

Openowledge has since registered as an official organization. It is now classified as an educational, nonprofit organization. It is also classified as an official volunteering organization.

== Organization ==
Openowledge is maintained by eight CheongShim International Academy students. Openowledge is divided into three parts: The 'share-knowledge' project, the 'foreign language content translation project' and the 'CheongShim Opencourseware (OCW).'

The share-knowledge project consists of videos created by CheongShim International Academy high-school students. The subjects include: Calculus, Western Philosophy, Problems in Economics, and neuroscience. The lecturers include a participant in the International Philosophy Olympiad and other students considered 'great lecturers.' The contents are shown for free on the website. As of August 2013, 32 original videos are available on the website.

The foreign language content translation project consists of videos translated from Khan Academy and MIT+K12. Translators ranges from elementary school students to college students and employed adults. As of November 2013, there are about 40 translators in total. Members estimate that the translation time for one video is about two hours. There are special translation teams such as 'ACG Translation Team' which translates the videos. Currently, a translation team consists of two or three members. The videos are shown free on the website. As of August 2013, there were about 35 translated lectures on the website.

The CheongShim Opencourseware consists of original lectures produced by CheongShim International Academy teachers. The videos are uploaded for free on the website and on YouTube.

== Future Plans ==
The founder Yu, Jin-Woo have stated that he hopes to have a total of 500 lecturers and 800 lectures by 2015 and have Openowledge named as the 'most diverse knowledge-sharing platform in the Republic of Korea.'
