= Cheongshim International Academy =

Private school in Gyeonggi Province, South Korea

CheongShim International Academy
- 청심국제중고등학교
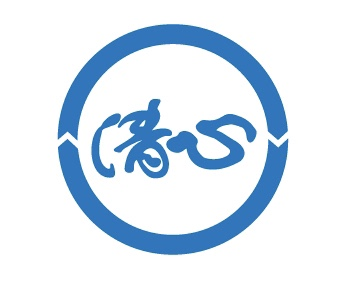

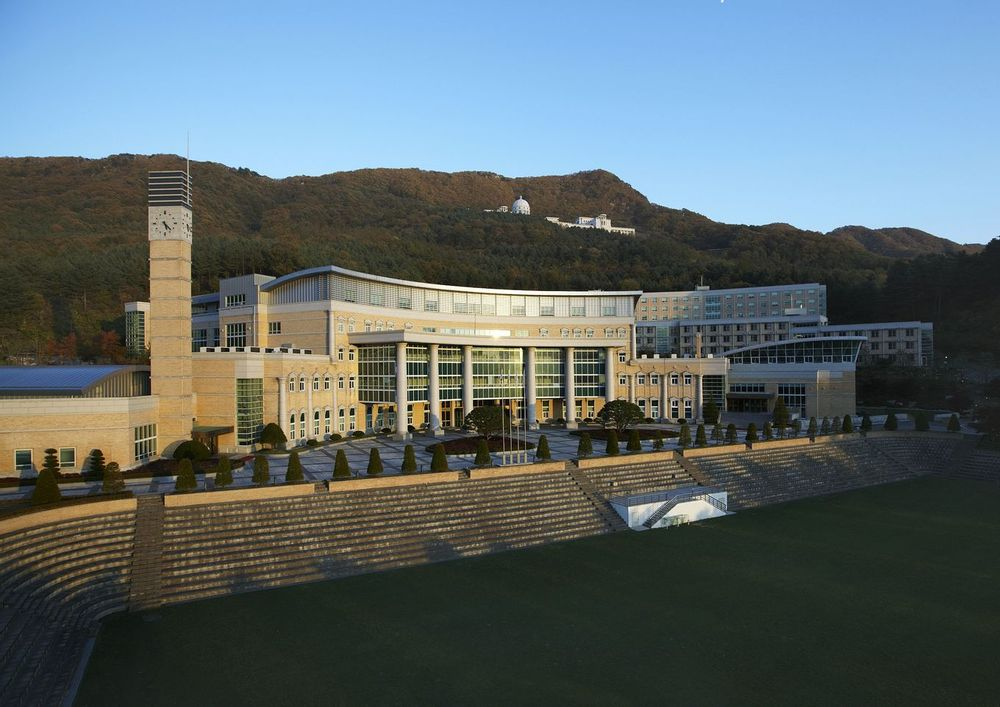

Location
- Gapyeong-Gun, Sorak-Myeon, Songsan-ri, 102 Beonji; Gapyeong, Gyeonggi Province; Republic of Korea; 37.687°N 127.540°E

Information
- Type: Private
- Motto: ACG (Altruistic Mind, Creative Knowledge, Global Leadership)
- Established: September 31st, 2006
- Principal: Cho, Hyung woo
- Grades: 7-12
- Gender: Coeducational
- Enrollment: approx. 600
- Campus: Rural
- Website: http://www.csia.hs.kr

CheongShim International Academy (Korean: 청심국제중고등학교, abbreviated as CSIA) is a private boarding school in South Korea located in Gapyeong County, Gyeonggi Province. CSIA is classified as a special purposes high school (특수목적고등학교) by the government of South Korea.

== History ==
=== Foundation ===
According to the CheongShim International School Official Website, the plans for the school began to be formulated in July 2002 by the Unification Church. The Foundation (engineering) plans were approved in June 2003. While the original name for the school was to CheongShim Middle and High School (청심중고등학교), the name was changed its current name in September 2005. The groundbreaking ceremony for the establishment of the school was held in November 2004. The school itself finished its construction process in 2005 and the completion of the building was commemorated with a ceremony in June 2005. The school received its certificate of incorporation in August 2005.

Originally, the school planned to admit three hundred students for each school. It was found with the purpose that all subjects except Korean language and Korean history would be taught in English. There were also specialized courses such as TOEFL and SAT classes to be offered to people who wish to study abroad in the future. The school also stated that it had plans to create a research institute for middle school studies in order to increase the expertise of its teachers. Although the school was technically labeled as a special-purposes high school, the admission process followed the procedure of a foreign language high school for the first year

The admission process for the first year of students began in November 2005. The requests for admissions and the documents were accepted from the beginning to the middle of November. The admissions tests were given around the second half of November and the selections were announced at the end of November. The first CheongShim Initiation ceremony was held in March 2006, with 99 middle school students and 100 high school students each. The first principal of CSIA, Lee Jong-Hyo was also appointed in March 2006.

=== Current ===
There are a total of 600 students in the school. There are a total of 47 teachers as of 2008, of which twelve are non-Korean teachers. Of the teachers, 17% of the teachers are non-Koreans and 56% hold a postgraduate degree. The current principal is Jun Sung Eun.

Currently, all classes besides Korean and Korean history are taught in English. All classes besides Korean and Korean history use American textbooks or textbooks chosen by the teachers. The Educational Philosophy follows the ACG (Altruistic Mind, Creative Knowledge, Global Leadership) motto of the school. The educational style has been claimed to broaden students' viewpoints and improve students' thinking. There are also optional classes after school hours.

CSIA currently consists of a middle school and a high school There are three buildings: the school, a dormitory for girls, and a dormitory for boys. The middle and high school are both located in the same building. There are approximately one hundred students in each grade, so there are approximately six hundred students in total. Each school annually accepts approximately one hundred students and a similar number graduates annually. The high school is divided into an international and a domestic division and classes are specialized for each department.

International curriculum alumni end up enrolling in universities such as Yale, Princeton, Stanford, MIT, University of Oxford, and domestic curriculum alumni, in Seoul National University, Korea University, and Yonsei University including many other competitive institutions and programs. The school offers both domestic and international curriculums. Despite its foundation by the Unification Church, most of the students are unaffiliated with the religion and mainly decide to enroll in the school due to its competitive program, stellar facilities, and excellent admissions results.

== Developments ==
The ratio of the accepted students to applied students in the middle school in 2008 was 22.6:1. In 2009, the ratio was 17.9:1. And in 2010, the ratio was 17.56:1. This had led some news organizations such as Veritas Alpha and Yonhap News to argue that the competition rate has been steadily decreasing.

CheongShim International Academy has also hosted and created several competitions over the years, including: ACG History Tournament, ACG Math Tournament, Youth Peace Camp, and CheongShim International Academy Model United Nations (CSIAMUN) The CheongShim Foundation is currently planning to create an elementary school for students who 'had prior experience abroad.' It had submitted the plan to the Gapyeong Educational Ministry but the plan has not been approved as of March 2013.

In 2013, students from CSIA created an organization called Openowledge.

== Admission process ==
Generally, there are five steps to the admission process: online application, physical application, a self-introduction letter, self-improvement plans, and an interview. CheongShim Middle School is the only school that accepts applicants from all of Korea

The middle school application process is divided into two general parts. In the first part, applications must submit their student records, a letter of self-introduction, and self-improvements plans worth 60 points, 25 points, and 65 points respectively. The topics on the applications are similar, but change every year. Middle school applicants must write the plans in the school under a time limit. The high school application process is divided into two different parts. In the first step, the applications are separated based on their English grades for their second and third year (four terms) in middle school. This part is worth 160 points. The second part is admitting the same applications, and the English grades are also included in this part. The average English grade is 1.3 class. The second part worth 40 points. There are no timed application writings for high school.

The self-improvement plans can be further subdivided into three different parts: self-studying plans, reading, and volunteering history. The self-studying plans is the most considered portion. Some news such as DongA has claimed that experience is the most valued element and that teachers' opinions are also highly valued.

== Criticism ==
CheongShim International Academy has been frequently referred to as a 'school for the rich.' People have argued that the lack of admissions involving students in the 'social consideration' category and the matching admissions in the 'social considerations without economic problems' category were indications that CheongShim was a school for nobility. Critics have also noted alleged manipulations and inadequate management of the admission process.
