= Gungmangbong (North Chungcheong) =

Mountain in South Korea

Highest point
- Elevation: 1,420 m (4,660 ft)

Geography
- Location: North Chungcheong Province, South Korea

Korean name
- Hangul: 국망봉
- Hanja: 國望峰
- RR: Gungmangbong
- MR: Kungmangbong

Gungmangbong (Korean: 국망봉) is a mountain of North Chungcheong Province, South Korea. It has an elevation of 1,420 metres.

== See also ==
- List of mountains of Korea
