= Cheongpyeong =

Town in Gapyeong, South Korea

Coordinates: 37°44′N 127°25′E

- Hangul: 청평면
- Hanja: 淸平面
- RR: Cheongpyeong-myeon
- MR: Ch'ŏngp'yŏng-myŏn

Cheongpyeong (Korean: 청평면) is a small town about 1 hour east of Seoul, South Korea, in Gapyeong County, Gyeonggi Province. It has a population of approximately 20,000. It is serviced by 3 schools: an elementary, middle and high school.

It attracts Korean tourists, especially in summer, due to its lakeside location surrounded by mountains and numerous resorts offering water sports.

== See also ==
- Geography of South Korea
