= Bukhan River =

River in North and South Koreas

Coordinates: 37°31′36″N 127°18′38″E

Bukhan River North Han River
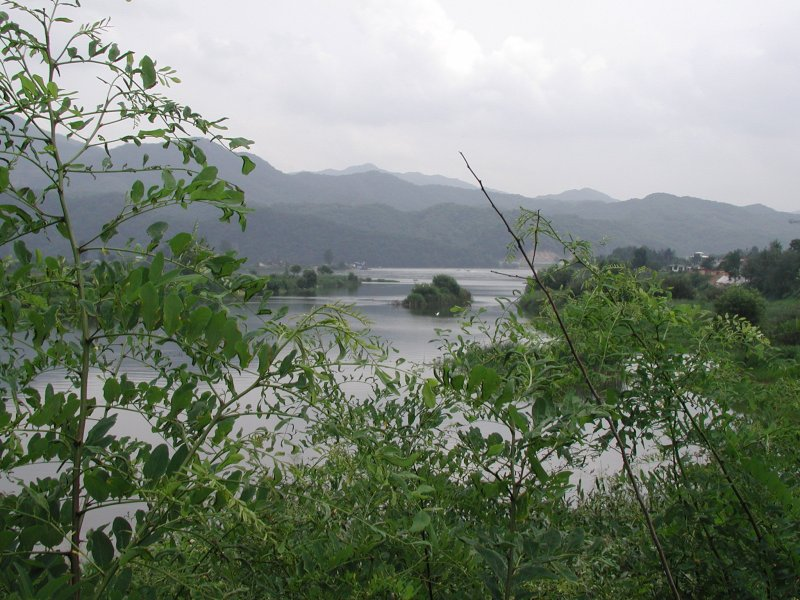
- The Bukhan River flowing through Gapyeong, South Korea.

Location
- Country: North Korea (PRK), South Korea (KOR)
- Provinces: Kangwon Province (PRK), Gangwon Province (KOR), Gyeonggi Province (KOR)

Physical characteristics
- Source: Taebaek Mountains
  - location: Okpat Peak, Kumgang, Kangwon, North Korea (Note: Okpat Peak (1,240.7 m/4,071 ft, Korean: 옥밭봉; Hanja: 옥밭峰; MR: Okpatpong) The peak is also known as Okbal Peak (옥발봉) or Okjeon Peak (옥전봉) in the South.)
- Mouth: Han River
  - location: Paldang Lake, Gyeonggi Province, South Korea
- Length: 482 km (300 mi)
- Basin size: 23,292 km^{2} (8,993 sq mi)

Basin features
- Tributaries
  - right: Yanggu Seocheon, Soyang River

Korean name
- Hangul: 북한강
- Hanja: 北漢江
- RR: Bukhangang
- MR: Pukhan'gang

The Bukhan River (Korean: 북한강; lit. 'North Han River') is a tributary of the Han River that flows through both North and South Korea. It traverses Kangwon Province, North Korea and the Gangwon and Gyeonggi Provinces in South Korea.

The Bukhan's headwaters lie in North Korea near Geumgangsan; this early portion of the river is often called the Geumgangcheon, or "Geumgang Stream." It crosses the Korean Demilitarized Zone and enters Hwacheon County, flowing south through Chuncheon and then west through Gapyeong. It joins with the Namhan River in Yangseo-myeon, Yangpyeong, to form the Han River.
