= Gapyeong County =

County in Gyeonggi Province, South Korea

Coordinates: 37°49′54″N 127°30′35″E

Gapyeong
- County
- Panoramic view of Gapyeong-eup

- Flag Emblem of Gapyeong

- Location in South Korea
- Country: South Korea
- Region: Sudogwon
- Province: Gyeonggi Province
- Administrative divisions: 1 eup, 5 myeon

Area
  - Total: 843.26 km^{2} (325.58 sq mi)

Population (September 2024)
  - Total: 62,492
  - Density: 73.59/km^{2} (190.6/sq mi)
  - Dialect: Gyeonggi

Korean name
- Hangul: 가평군
- Hanja: 加平郡
- RR: Gapyeong-gun
- MR: Kap'yŏng-gun

Gapyeong County (Korean: 가평군), alternatively Kapyong County, is a county in Gyeonggi Province, South Korea. It was the scene of the Battle of Kapyong, a major battle of the Korean War.

== Administrative Region and Language ==
Gapyeong County has one eup and five myeons, and its population is 62,448 with 29,212 households based on resident registration at the end of December 2016, with an area of 843.6 km^{2}. About 31.6 percent of the population lives in Gapyeong-eup, while 23.1 percent lives in Cheongpyeong-myeon.

== Tourism ==
Gapyeong is known for its natural environment, and borders the mountainous province of Gangwon on the east. The north branch of the Han River flows through the area. Several reservoirs and resorts are located in the county. The Namiseom resort island, while not strictly located in the county, is situated very close south of Gapyeong.

Gapyeong is also known for being the home to a number of Korea's makgeolli producers and it is where an annual National Makgeolli Festival has been held since 2011.

== Education ==
Cheongshim Graduate School of Theology is a school run by the Unification Church. It is located in Seorak-myeon, and was dedicated on January 28, 2004. The school serves as a post-graduate institution teaching Unification theology.

Cheongshim International Academy is located in the county as well.

== Climate ==
Gapyeong has a monsoon-influenced humid continental climate (Köppen: Dwa) with cold, dry winters and hot, rainy summers.

Climate data for Gapyeong (1993–2020 normals)
| Month | Jan | Feb | Mar | Apr | May | Jun | Jul | Aug | Sep | Oct | Nov | Dec | Year |
|---|---|---|---|---|---|---|---|---|---|---|---|---|---|
| Mean daily maximum °C (°F) | 1.0 (33.8) | 4.5 (40.1) | 11.0 (51.8) | 18.3 (64.9) | 23.8 (74.8) | 27.6 (81.7) | 28.7 (83.7) | 29.7 (85.5) | 25.5 (77.9) | 19.3 (66.7) | 10.8 (51.4) | 2.6 (36.7) | 16.9 (62.4) |
| Daily mean °C (°F) | −5.3 (22.5) | −2.1 (28.2) | 3.8 (38.8) | 10.3 (50.5) | 16.3 (61.3) | 20.9 (69.6) | 23.5 (74.3) | 24.0 (75.2) | 18.5 (65.3) | 11.2 (52.2) | 4.0 (39.2) | −3.3 (26.1) | 10.2 (50.4) |
| Mean daily minimum °C (°F) | −11.3 (11.7) | −8.3 (17.1) | −2.9 (26.8) | 2.9 (37.2) | 9.1 (48.4) | 14.9 (58.8) | 19.9 (67.8) | 19.9 (67.8) | 13.5 (56.3) | 5.2 (41.4) | −1.6 (29.1) | −8.7 (16.3) | 4.4 (39.9) |
| Average precipitation mm (inches) | 15.4 (0.61) | 28.9 (1.14) | 32.3 (1.27) | 74.9 (2.95) | 93.5 (3.68) | 130.2 (5.13) | 417.9 (16.45) | 346.3 (13.63) | 120.1 (4.73) | 52.1 (2.05) | 44.8 (1.76) | 18.4 (0.72) | 1,374.8 (54.13) |
| Average precipitation days (≥ 0.1 mm) | 3.3 | 4.0 | 5.3 | 6.9 | 7.7 | 8.5 | 14.0 | 12.8 | 7.2 | 5.3 | 6.6 | 4.8 | 86.4 |
Source: Korea Meteorological Administration

== Sister cities ==
- Kota Kinabalu, Malaysia
- Gangnam-gu, South Korea
- Cedar City, Utah, United States

== See also ==
- Cheongpyeong
- Cheongpyeong Lake
- Geography of South Korea
- Gapyeong Canada Monument
