= Toegyewon station =

Train station in South Korea

퇴계원
Toegyewon
퇴계원; Toegyewon
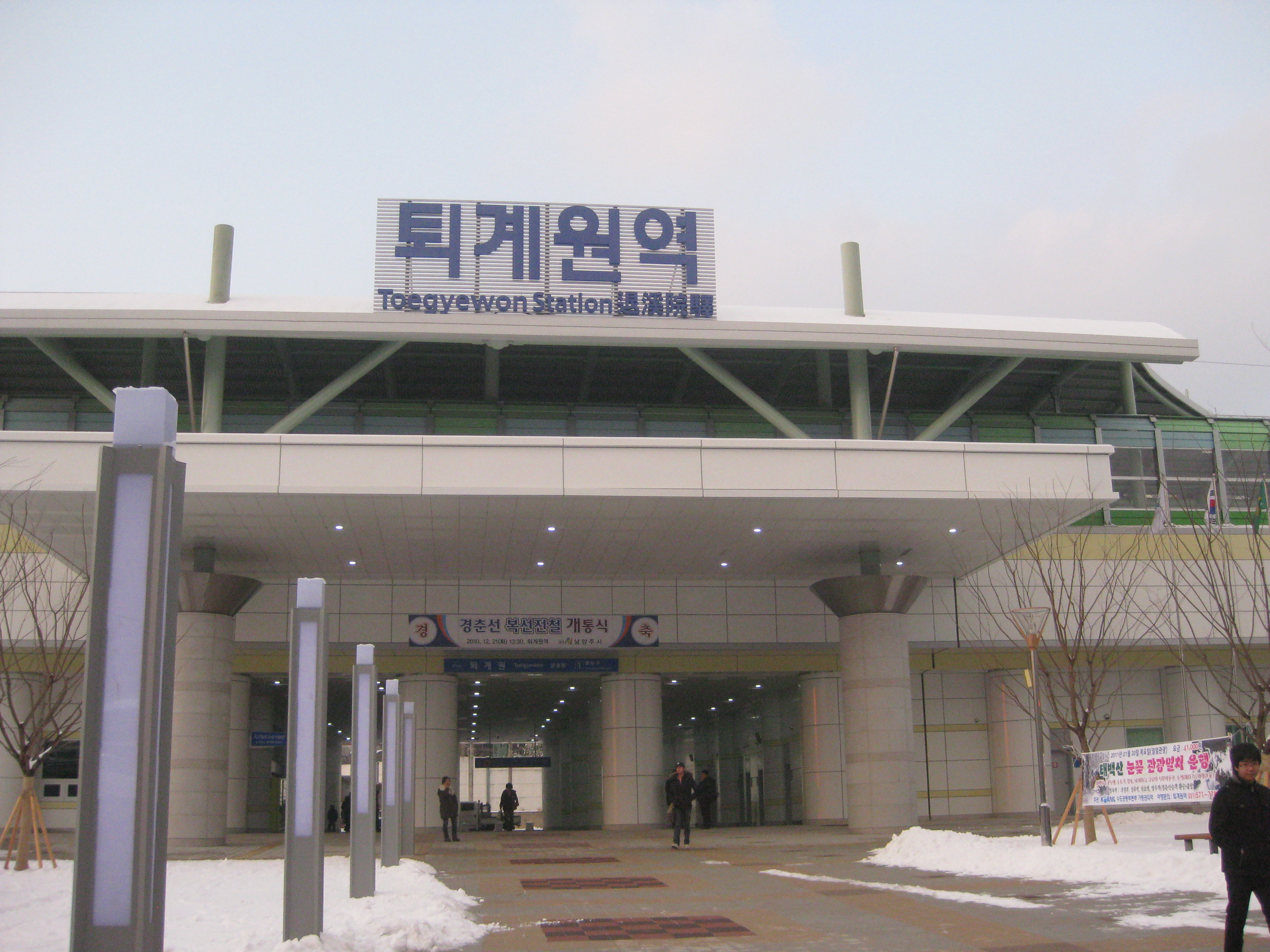

Korean name
- Hangul: 퇴계원역
- Hanja: 退溪院驛
- Revised Romanization: Toegyewonnyeok
- McCune–Reischauer: T'oegyewŏnnyŏk

General information
- Location: 218-142 Toegyewon-ri, 545 Gyeongchunbungno, Toegyewon-myeon, Namyangju-si, Gyeonggi-do
- Coordinates: 37.64822°N 127.14403°E
- Operator: Korail
- Line: Gyeongchun Line
- Platforms: 2
- Tracks: 4
- Connections: Bus stop

Construction
- Structure type: Aboveground

History
- Opened: December 21, 2010

Services
Preceding station	Seoul Metropolitan Subway	Following station
Byeollae towards Cheongnyangni or Kwangwoon University	Gyeongchun Line	Sareung towards Chuncheon
Byeollae towards Cheongnyangni	Gyeongchun Line Express	Sareung towards Chuncheon
Preceding station	Korail	Following station
Sangbong towards Yongsan	ITX-Cheongchun	Sareung towards Chuncheon
Location

Toegyewon Station (Korean: 퇴계원역; Hanja: 退溪院驛) is a railway station of the Gyeongchun Line in Toegyewon-myeon, Namyangju-si, Gyeonggi-do, South Korea.

== Station Layout ==
L2; Platforms	Eastbound	Gyeongchun Line Local toward Chuncheon (Sareung) →
L2; Platforms	Island platform, doors will open on the left and right
L2; Platforms	Eastbound	Gyeongchun Line Express toward Chuncheon (Sareung) →
L2; Platforms	Westbound	← Gyeongchun Line Express toward Cheongnyangni (Byeollae)
L2; Platforms	Island platform, doors will open on the left and right
L2; Platforms	Westbound	← Gyeongchun Line Local toward Cheongnyangni or Kwangwoon Univ. (Byeollae)

L1; Concourse	Lobby	Customer Service, Shops, Vending machines, ATMs

G	Street level	Exit

== Surface connections ==
Station links bus stop for the following routes:

Route	Destinations	
202	WB	Hyundai Core
202	EB	Jinbeol-ri Garage
