= Sareung station =

Train station in South Korea

사릉
Sareung
| 사릉; Sareung |
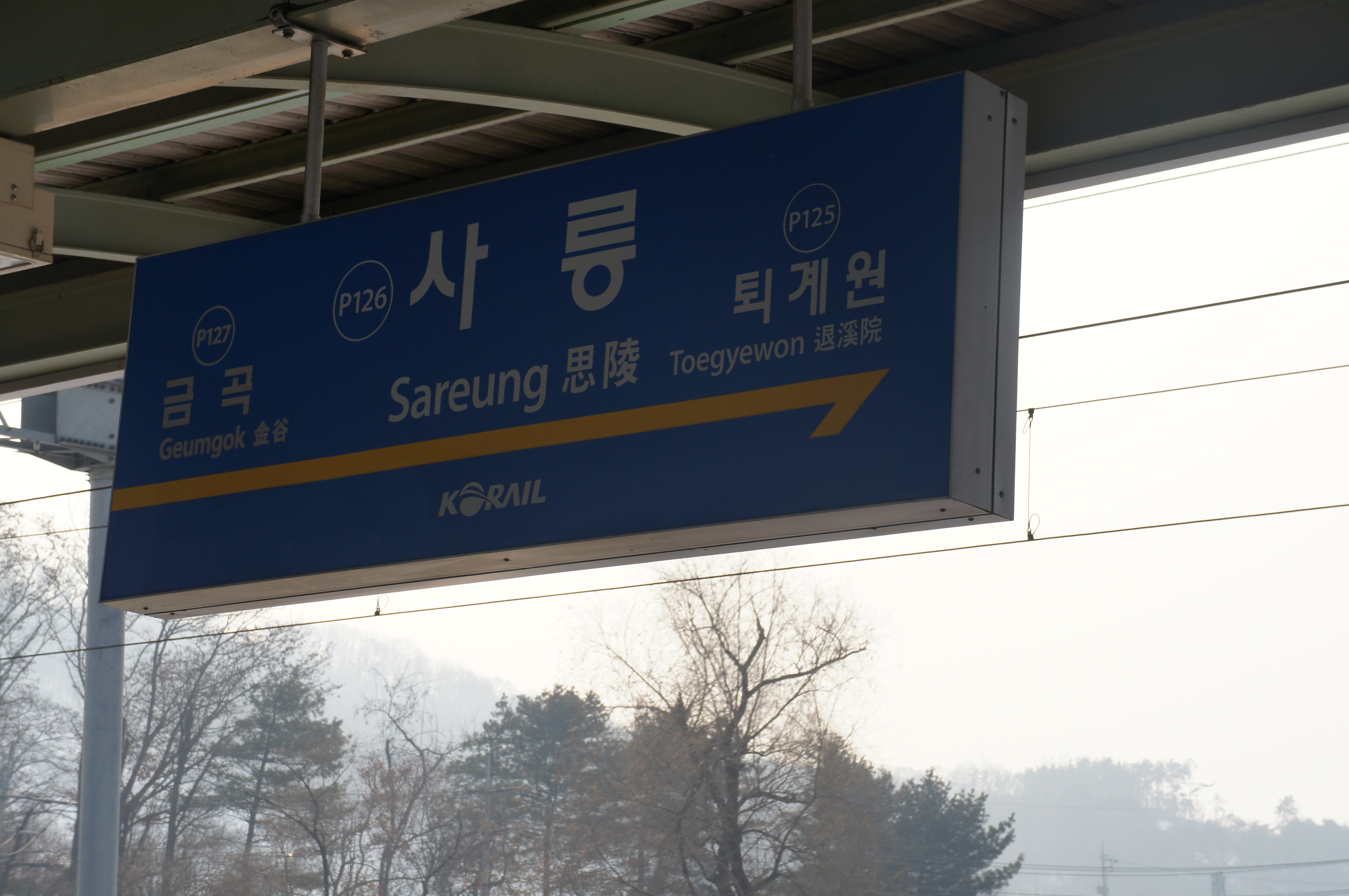

Korean name
- Hangul: 사릉역
- Hanja: 思陵驛
- Revised Romanization: Sareung-yeok
- McCune–Reischauer: Sarŭng-yŏk

General information
- Location: 590-2 Saneung-ri, 72-8 Jingeonuhoero, Jingeon-eup, Namyangju-si, Gyeonggi-do
- Coordinates: 37°39′01″N 127°10′44″E
- Operator: Korail
- Line: Gyeongchun Line
- Platforms: 2
- Tracks: 4

Construction
- Structure type: Aboveground

History
- Opened: December 21, 2010

Services
| Preceding station | Seoul Metropolitan Subway | Following station |
|---|---|---|
| Toegyewon towards Cheongnyangni or Kwangwoon University | Gyeongchun Line | Geumgok towards Chuncheon |
| Toegyewon towards Cheongnyangni | Gyeongchun Line Express | PyeongnaeHopyeong towards Chuncheon |
| Preceding station | Korail | Following station |
| Toegyewon towards Yongsan | ITX-Cheongchun | PyeongnaeHopyeong towards Chuncheon |
Location

Sareung Station (Korean: 사릉역; Hanja: 思陵驛) is a railway station on the Gyeongchun Line in Jingeon-eup, Namyangju-si, Gyeonggi-do, South Korea. It is named after Sareung, the royal tomb of Queen Jeongsun, the queen consort of Danjong, the sixth king of the Joseon Dynasty.

== Station Layout ==
| L2; Platforms | Eastbound | Gyeongchun Line Local toward Chuncheon (Geumgok) → |
| L2; Platforms | Island platform, doors will open on the left and right |
| L2; Platforms | Eastbound | Gyeongchun Line Express toward Chuncheon (PyeongnaeHopyeong) → |
| L2; Platforms | Westbound | ← Gyeongchun Line Express toward Cheongnyangni (Toegyewon) |
| L2; Platforms | Island platform, doors will open on the left and right |
| L2; Platforms | Westbound | ← Gyeongchun Line Local toward Cheongnyangni or Kwangwoon Univ. (Toegyewon) |

| L1; Concourse | Lobby | Customer Service, Shops, Vending machines, ATMs |

| G | Street level | Exit |
