= Geumgok station (Namyangju) =

Train station in South Korea

금곡; Geumgok
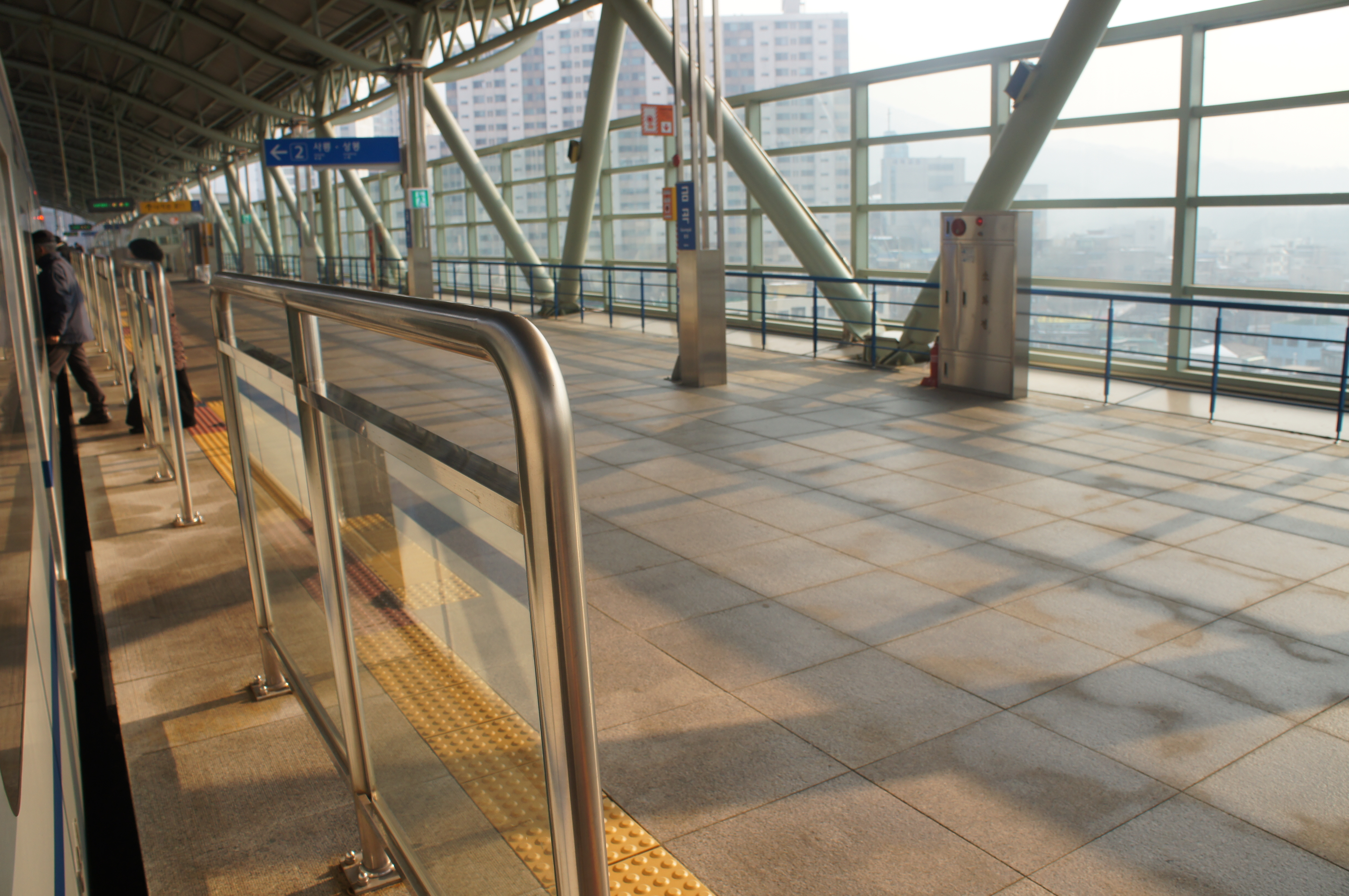

Korean name
- Hangul: 금곡역
- Hanja: 金谷驛
- Revised Romanization: Geumgongnyeok
- McCune–Reischauer: Kŭmgongnyŏk

General information
- Location: 687-4 Geumgok-dong, 903 Gyeongchunno, Namyangju-si, Gyeonggi-do
- Coordinates: 37°37′59″N 127°12′07″E
- Operator: Korail
- Line: Gyeongchun Line
- Platforms: 2
- Tracks: 2

Construction
- Structure type: Aboveground

History
- Opened: December 21, 2010

Services
Preceding station	Seoul Metropolitan Subway	Following station
Sareung towards Cheongnyangni or Kwangwoon University	Gyeongchun Line	PyeongnaeHopyeong towards Chuncheon
Location

Geumgok Station (Korean: 금곡역; Hanja: 金谷驛) is a railway station of the Gyeongchun Line in Geumgok-dong, Namyangju-si, Gyeonggi-do, South Korea.

== Station Layout ==
L2; Platforms	Side platform, doors will open on the left
L2; Platforms	Eastbound	Gyeongchun Line toward Chuncheon (PyeongnaeHopyeong) →
L2; Platforms	Westbound	← Gyeongchun Line toward Cheongnyangni or Kwangwoon Univ. (Sareung)
L2; Platforms	Side platform, doors will open on the left

L1; Concourse	Lobby	Customer Service, Shops, Vending machines, ATMs

G	Street level	Exit
