= Pyeongnaehopyeong station =

Train station in South Korea

평내호평
PyeongnaeHopyeong
평내호평; PyeongnaeHopyeong
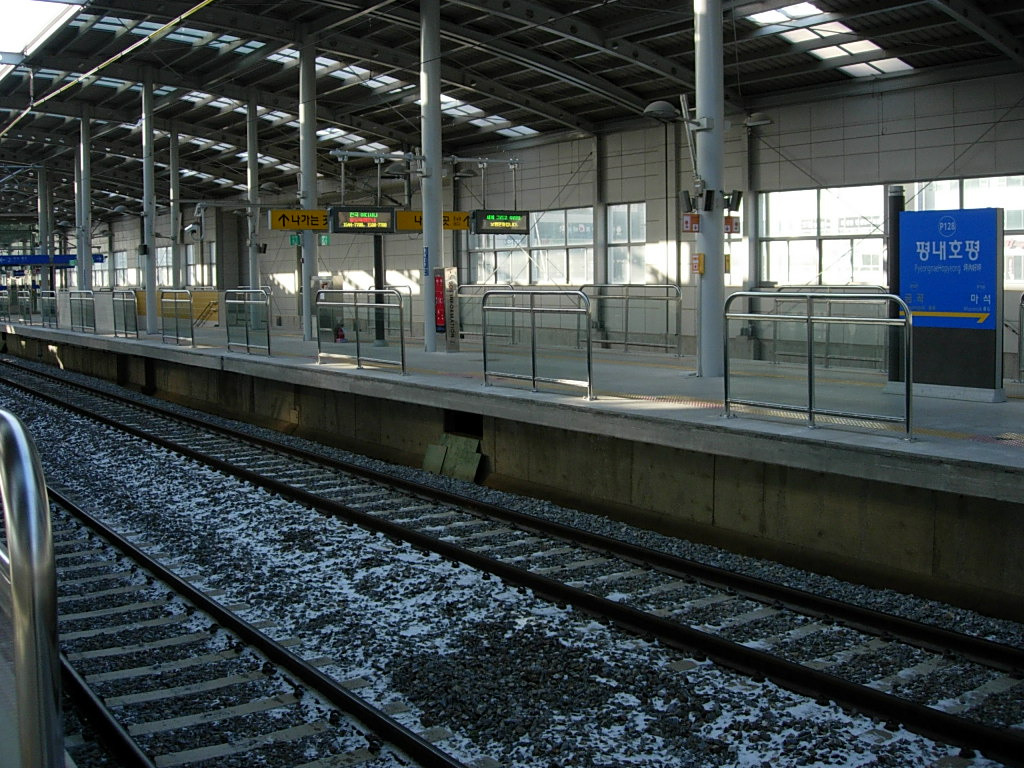
- The station platform in 2010

Korean name
- Hangul: 평내호평역
- Hanja: 坪內好坪驛
- Revised Romanization: Pyeongnaehopyeongnyeok
- McCune–Reischauer: P'yŏngnaehop'yŏngnyŏk

General information
- Location: 660 Pyeongnae-dong, 1375 Gyeongchunno, Namyangju-si, Gyeonggi-do
- Coordinates: 37.6533°N 127.2445°E
- Operator: Korail
- Line: Gyeongchun Line
- Platforms: 2
- Tracks: 4

Construction
- Structure type: Aboveground

History
- Opened: July 20, 1939
- Rebuilt: December 21, 2010

Key dates
- December 21, 2010: Gyeongchun Line started service

Services
Preceding station	Seoul Metropolitan Subway	Following station
Geumgok towards Cheongnyangni or Kwangwoon University	Gyeongchun Line	Cheonmasan towards Chuncheon
Sareung towards Cheongnyangni	Gyeongchun Line Express	Maseok towards Chuncheon
Preceding station	Korail	Following station
Sareung towards Yongsan	ITX-Cheongchun	Maseok towards Chuncheon
Location

PyeongnaeHopyeong Station (Korean: 평내호평역; Hanja: 坪內好坪驛) is a railway station on the Gyeongchun Line of the Seoul Metropolitan Subway in Pyeongnae-dong, Namyangju, Gyeonggi Province, South Korea. It opened in 1939 as Pyeongnae station and was renamed in 2006. Operated by Korail, the station began Seoul Metropolitan Subway service on December 21, 2010, when the rebuilt Gyeongchun Line was integrated into the network.

== History ==
The station opened on July 20, 1939, as Pyeongnae station (평내역), a temporary halt on the Gyeongchun Line. It was promoted to a full station on February 21, 1969, and later downgraded to a minor halt. On August 31, 2006, it was renamed PyeongnaeHopyeong station (평내호평역) and moved to a new site. The rebuilt, double-tracked and electrified Gyeongchun Line opened on December 21, 2010, integrating the station into the Seoul Metropolitan Subway.

== Station layout ==
Station layout
Level	Direction	Line and destination
L2 Platforms	Eastbound	Gyeongchun Line Local toward Chuncheon (Cheonmasan) →
L2 Platforms	Island platform, doors open on both sides	
L2 Platforms	Eastbound	Gyeongchun Line Express toward Chuncheon (Maseok) →
L2 Platforms	Westbound	← Gyeongchun Line Express toward Cheongnyangni (Sareung)
L2 Platforms	Side platform, doors open on both sides	
L2 Platforms	Westbound	← Gyeongchun Line Local toward Cheongnyangni or Kwangwoon Univ. (Geumgok)
L1	Concourse	Lobby, customer service, shops, vending machines, ATMs
G	Street level	Exit

== Gallery ==
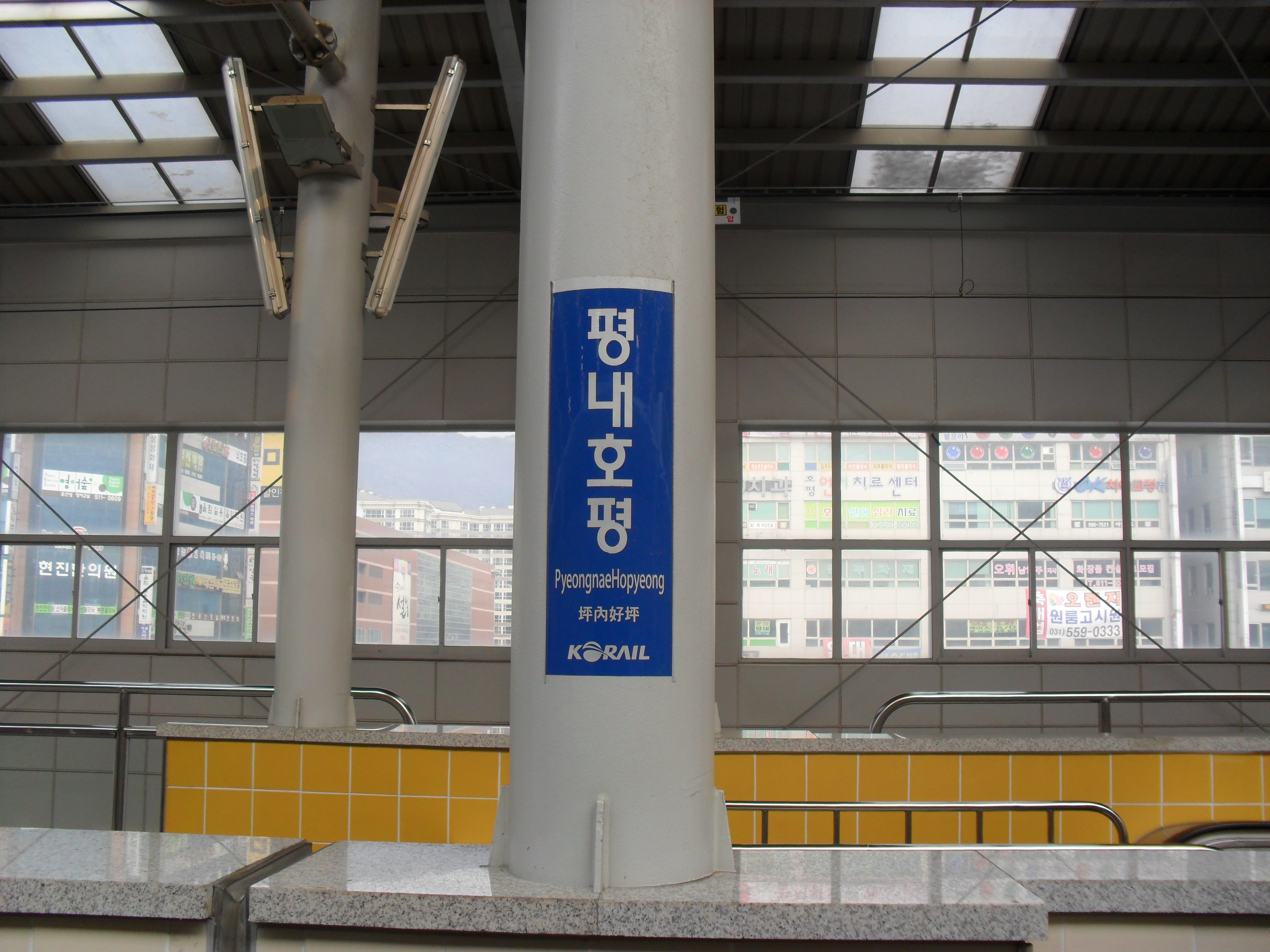
Station name sign on the platform

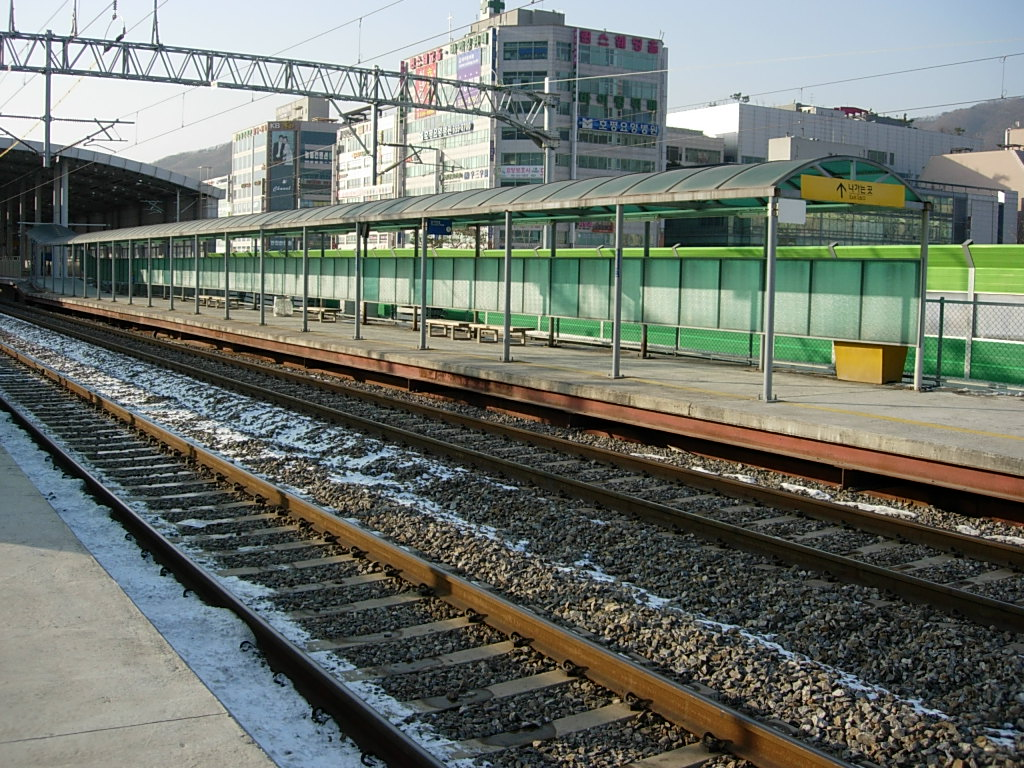
Platform and tracks
