= Sangsaek station =

Defunct railway station in South Korea

Sangsaek station is a closed station on the Gyeongchun Line in South Korea.
