= Damnae station =

Defunct railway station in South Korea

- Hangul: 답내역
- Hanja: 沓內驛
- Revised Romanization: Damnae-yeok
- McCune–Reischauer: Tamnae-yŏk

Damnae station is a closed station. It was on the Gyeongchun Line. It was opened as an unstaffed station on August 21, 1960 before pickup and dropoff of passengers ceased at the station a year later on June 20, 1961. It was remade as a temporary platform for trains stops, though not passenger transport, on October 1, 1970 before officially being permanently closed and abolished from the listings on December 5, 1974.
