= Uiam station =

Defunct railway station in South Korea

Uiam station is a closed station on the Gyeongchun Line in South Korea. It was open between 1939 and 1974.
