= Wolgok station (Gyeongchun Line) =

Defunct railway station in South Korea

Wolgok station (Korean: 월곡역) was a closed station on the Gyeongchun Line in South Korea.
