= ITX-Cheongchun =

Class of passenger train service in South Korea

Overview
- Service type: Limited express (Higher-speed rail)
- Status: Operating
- Locale: South Korea
- Predecessor: Gyeongchun Line Mugunghwa-ho services
- First service: February 28, 2012
- Current operator: Korail

Route
- Lines used: Gyeongchun Line, Jungang line, Gyeongwon Line

Technical
- Rolling stock: Korail Class 368000
- Track gauge: 1,435 mm (4 ft 8 1/2 in) standard gauge
- Operating speed: 198 km/h (123 mph)

The Intercity Train eXpress-Cheongchun (ITX-Cheongchun; Korean: ITX-청춘) is a class of train operated by Korail, the national railroad of South Korea, introduced on February 28, 2012. The ITX-Cheongchun is the successor of the Gyeongchun Line Mugunghwa-ho services which operated until December 2010. The ITX-Cheongchun is known to benchmark Japan's limited express trains. Korea's first double-decker coach ran on this line. This train connects Seoul, Guri, Namyangju, Gapyeong and Chuncheon. ITX-Cheongchun trains have an average speed of 180 kilometers per hour.

== Regular services ==
After the abolition of the Gyeongchun Line Mugunghwa-ho services, which ran until December 2010, the ITX-Cheongchun limited express came into service on February 28, 2012.

As of July 9, 2021, the ITX Cheongchun operates 18 round trips on weekdays, 30 round trips Saturdays, 27 round trips Sundays and public holidays. All trains operate on the Gyeongchun, Gyeongwon and Jungang Lines.

=== Stops ===
==== Stations served ====
Gyeongchun Line: Yongsan, Oksu, Wangsimni, Cheongnyangni, Sangbong, Toegyewon, Sareung, PyeongnaeHopyeong, Maseok, Cheongpyeong, Gapyeong, Gangchon, Namchuncheon, Chuncheon

== Rolling stock ==
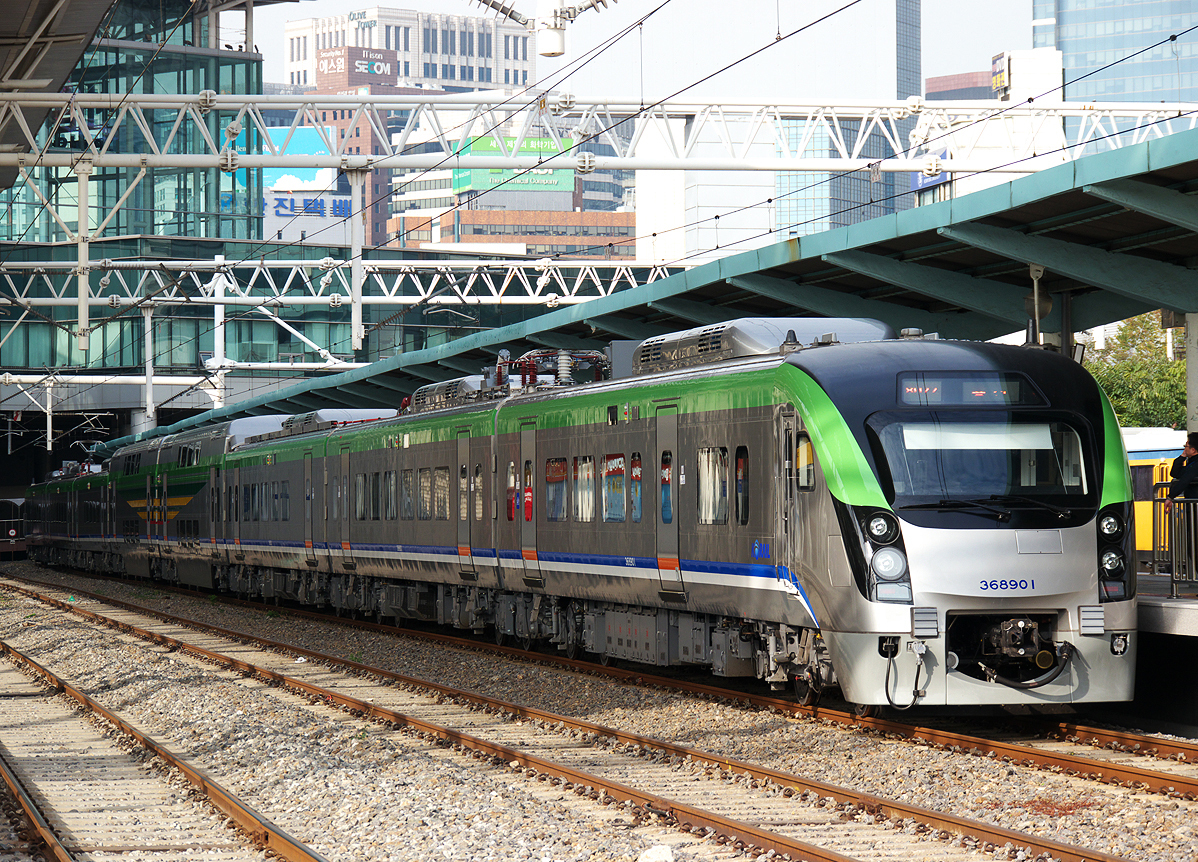
A Korail Class 368000 train in October 2011

- Korail Class 368000 (since February 2012)

=== Formations ===
| Car No. | 1 | 2 | 3 | 4 | 5 | 6 | 7 | 8 |
|---|---|---|---|---|---|---|---|---|
| Accommodation | Reserved | Reserved | Reserved | 2F reserved 1F Non-reserved | 2F reserved 1F Non-reserved | Reserved | Reserved | Reserved |
| Facilities | Bicycle stand | | Wheelchair space / Toilet | | | Toilet | | Bicycle stand |

There are standing seats near the entrance door. 1F Non-reserved seats for Car No.4 and No.5 are open only on weekdays and reserved seats are on weekends. Tickets are divided into reserved, non-reserved and standing seats. The rolling stock was manufactured by Hyundai Rotem.

== Interior ==
Seats on the ITX-Cheongchun are laid out in a 2+2 abreast configuration, with the seat pitch being 980 mm (39 in).

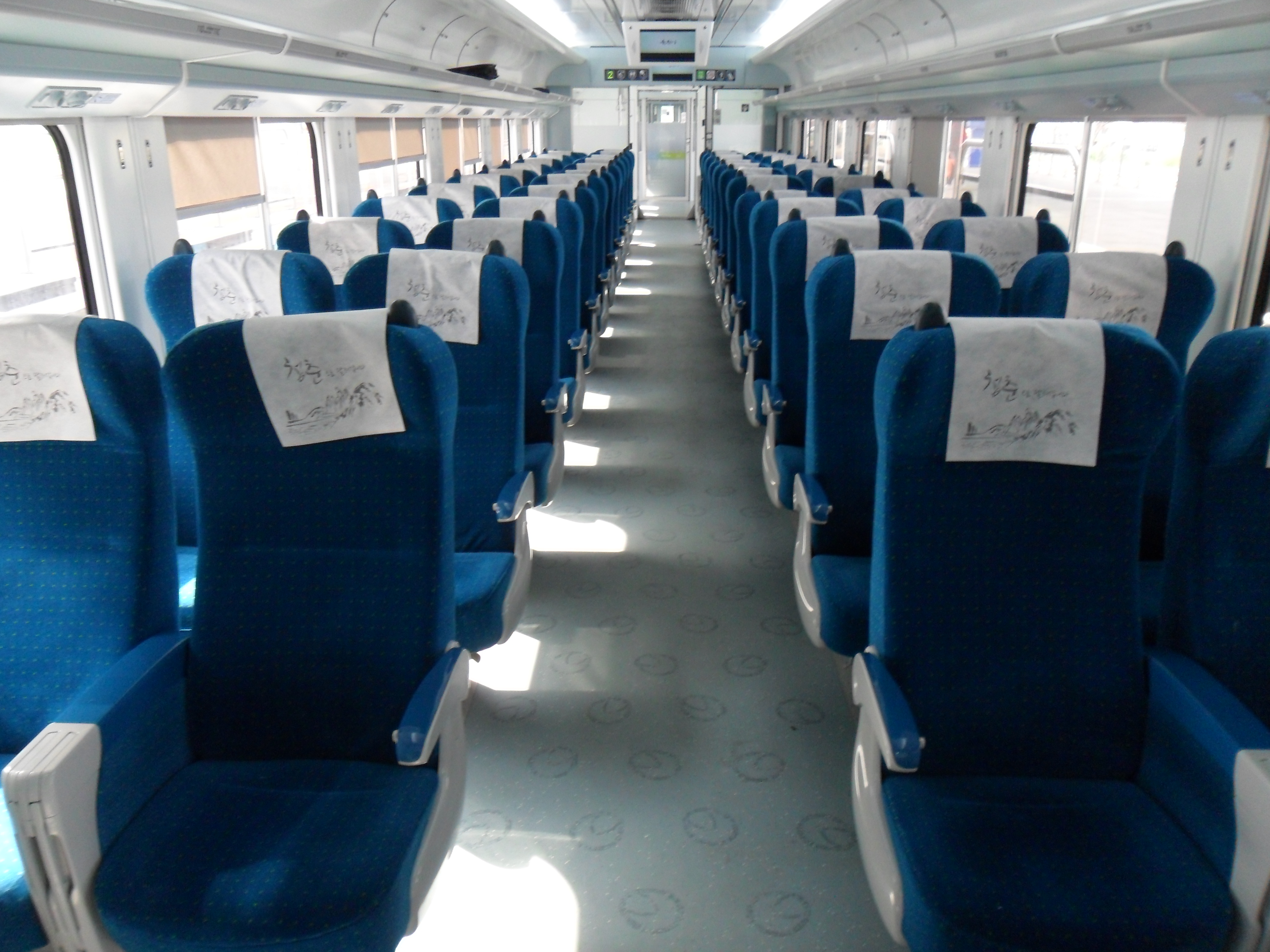
Reserved seat interior

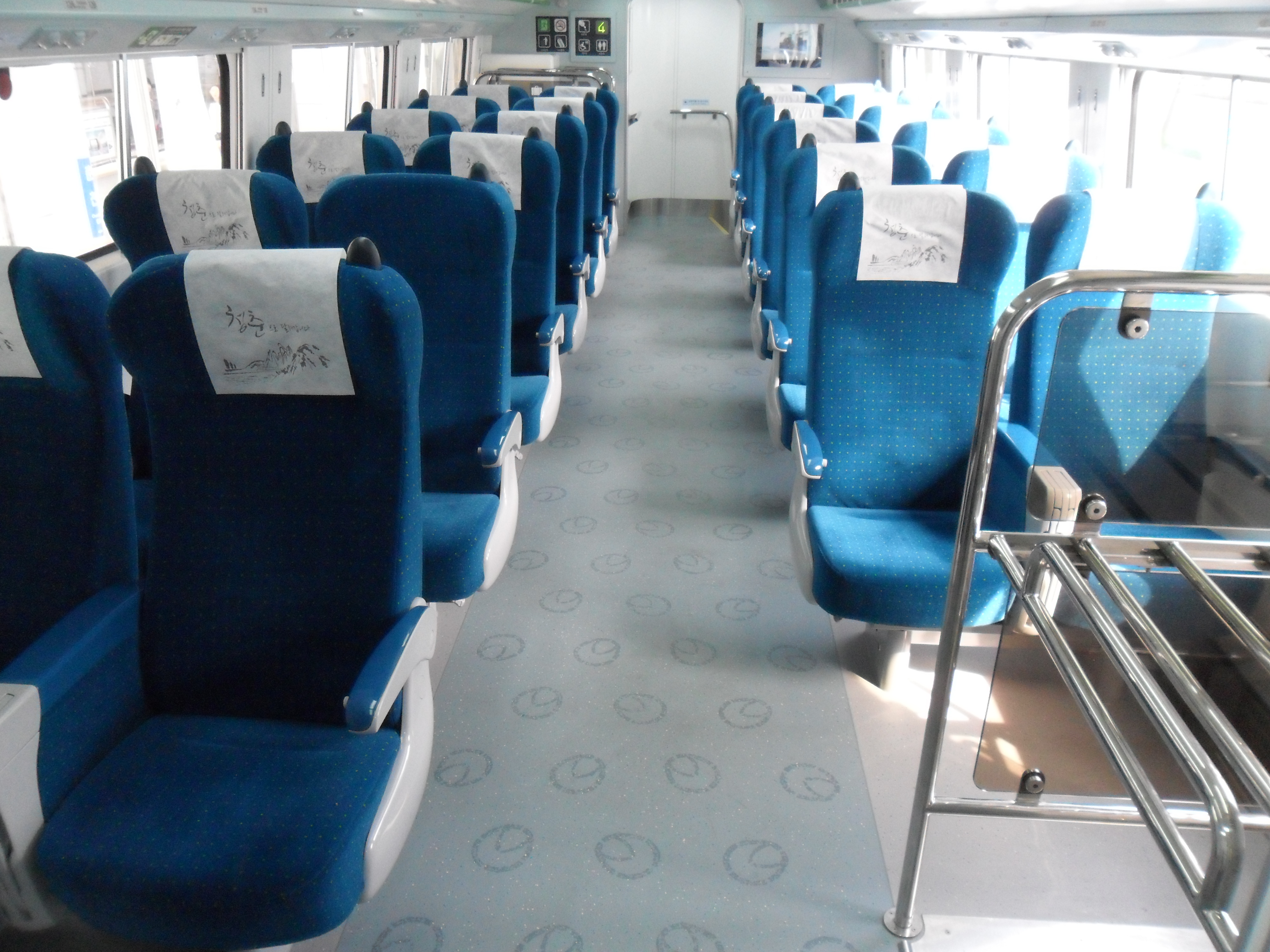
Reserved seat 2F interior

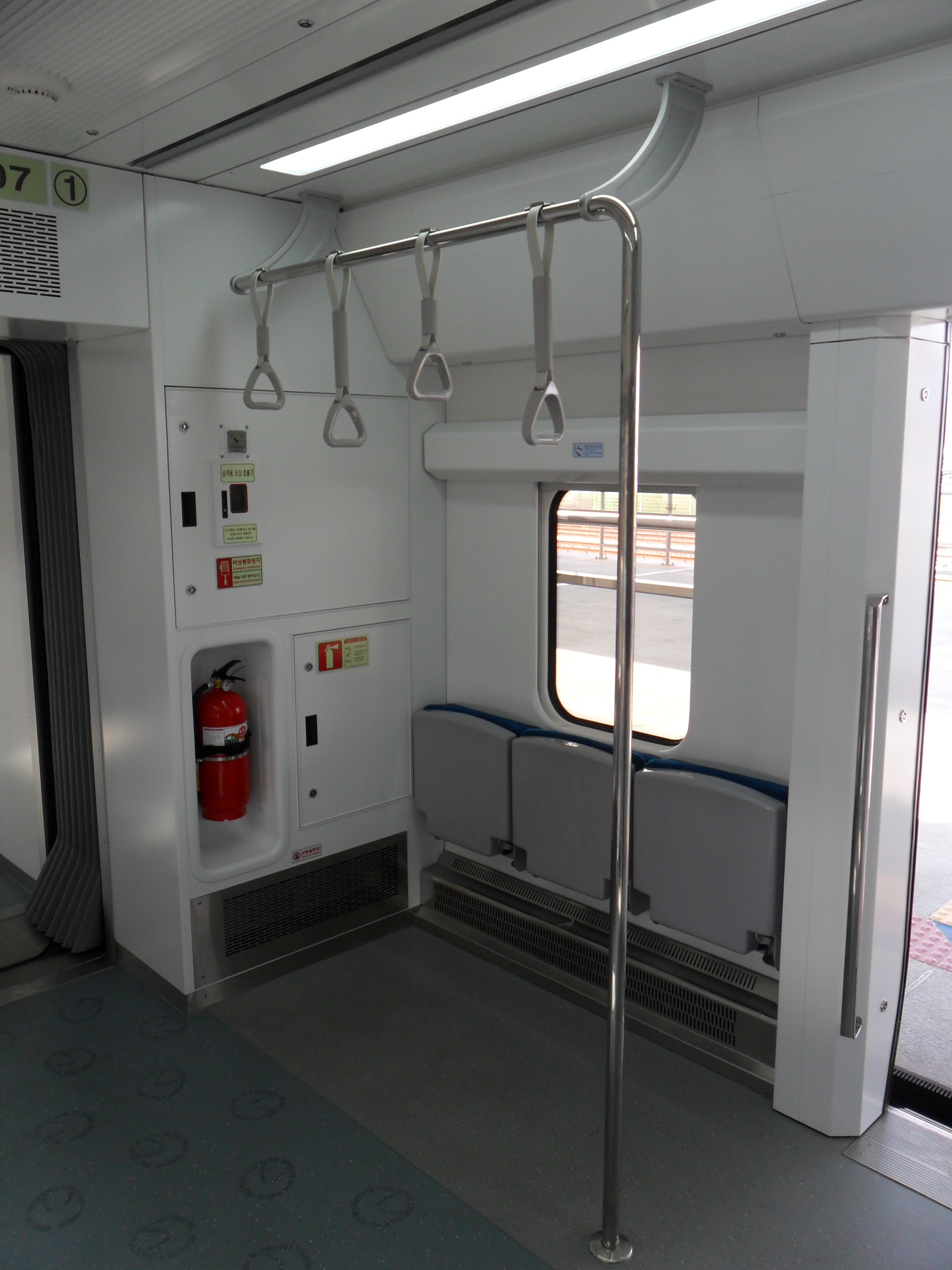
Standing seat interior

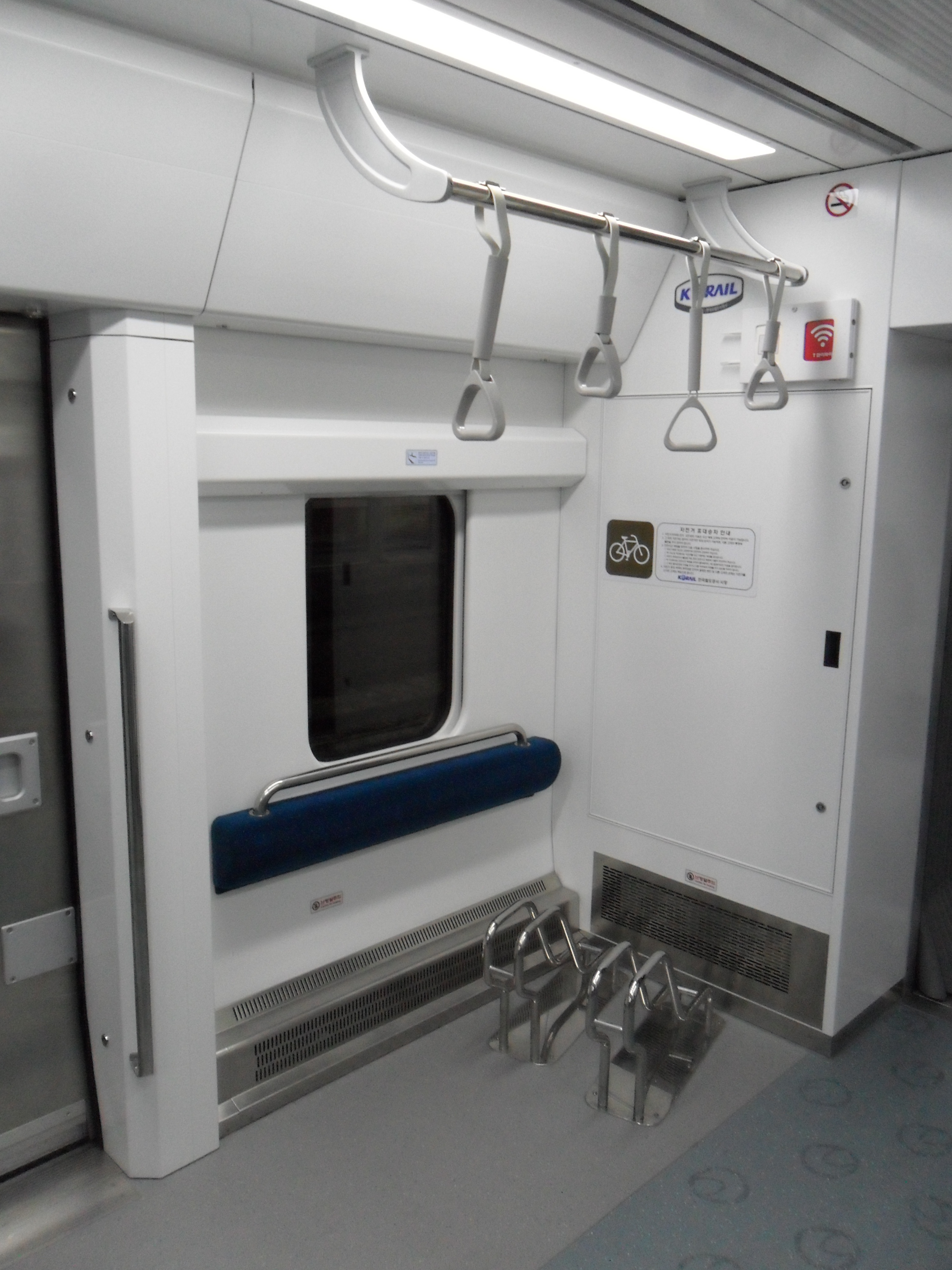
Bicycle stand
