= Singongdeok station =

Railway station in South Korea

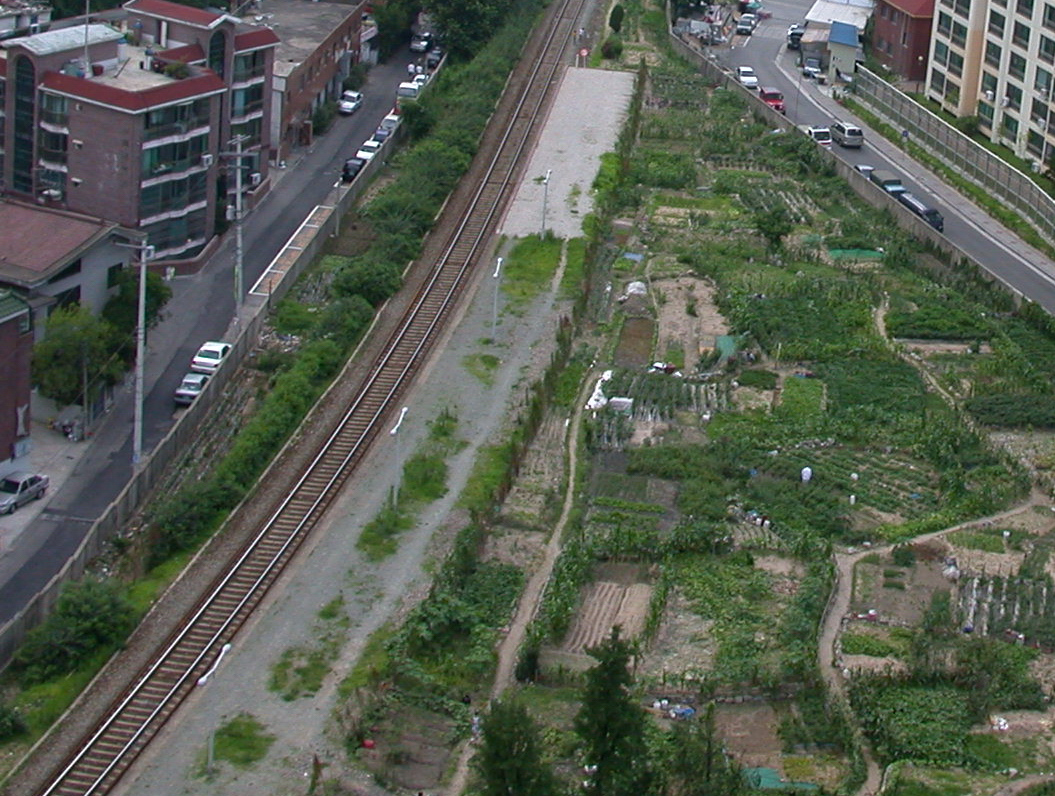
site

Singongdeok station was a railway station on the Gyeongchun Line.
