= Hwarangdae station (Gyeongchun Line) =

Defunct railway station in Seoul, South Korea

Coordinates: 37°37′29.25″N 127°5′36.65″E

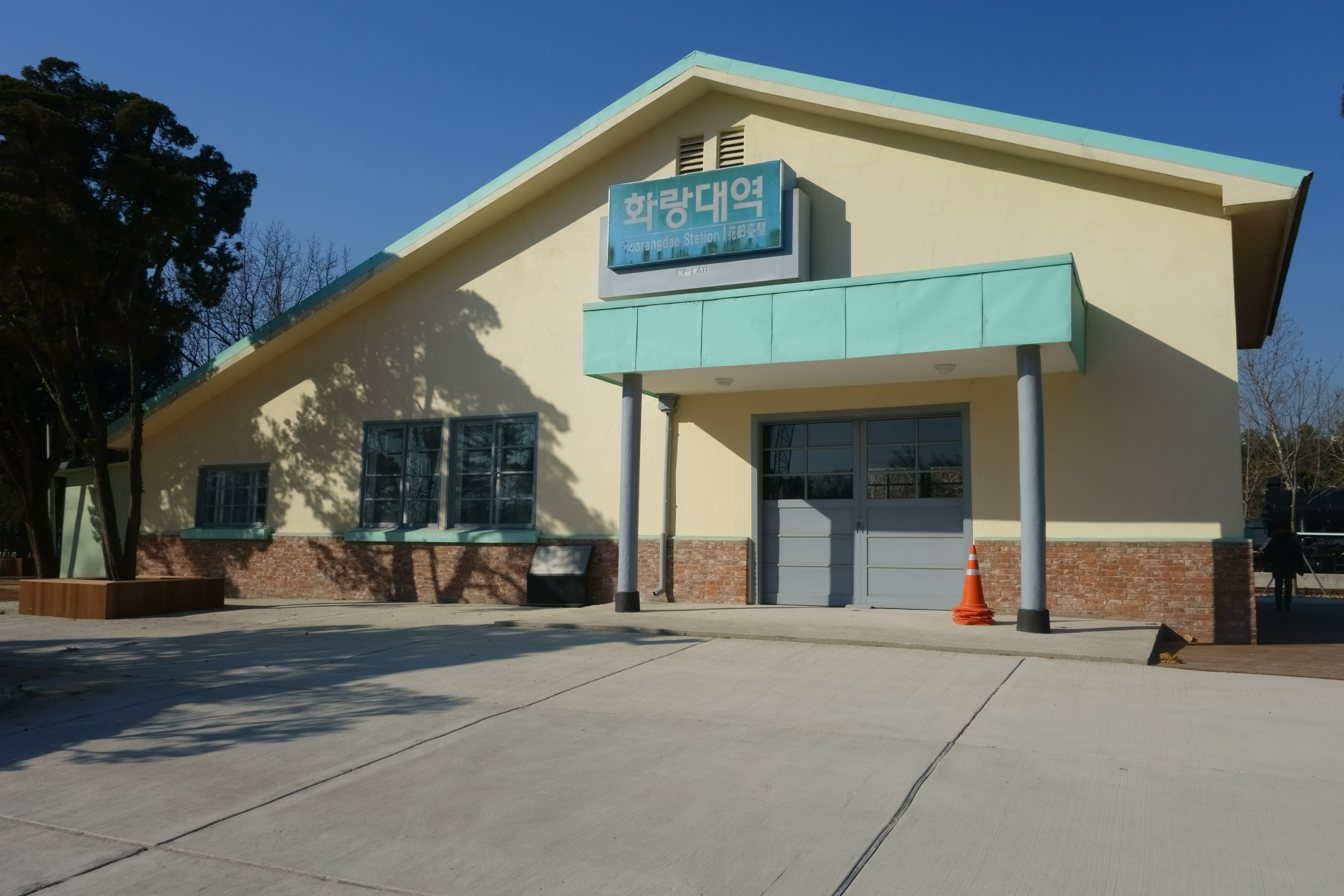
Hwarangdae station

Hwarangdae station (Korean: 화랑대역) was a railway station on the Gyeongchun Line in South Korea, which started operation in 1939 under the name Taereung station (태릉역). It was renamed Hwarangdae in 1958. It was closed in 2010 and is currently preserved as a museum. The wooden building is a registered cultural heritage property since 2006.
