= Korail Class 368000 =

South Korean train

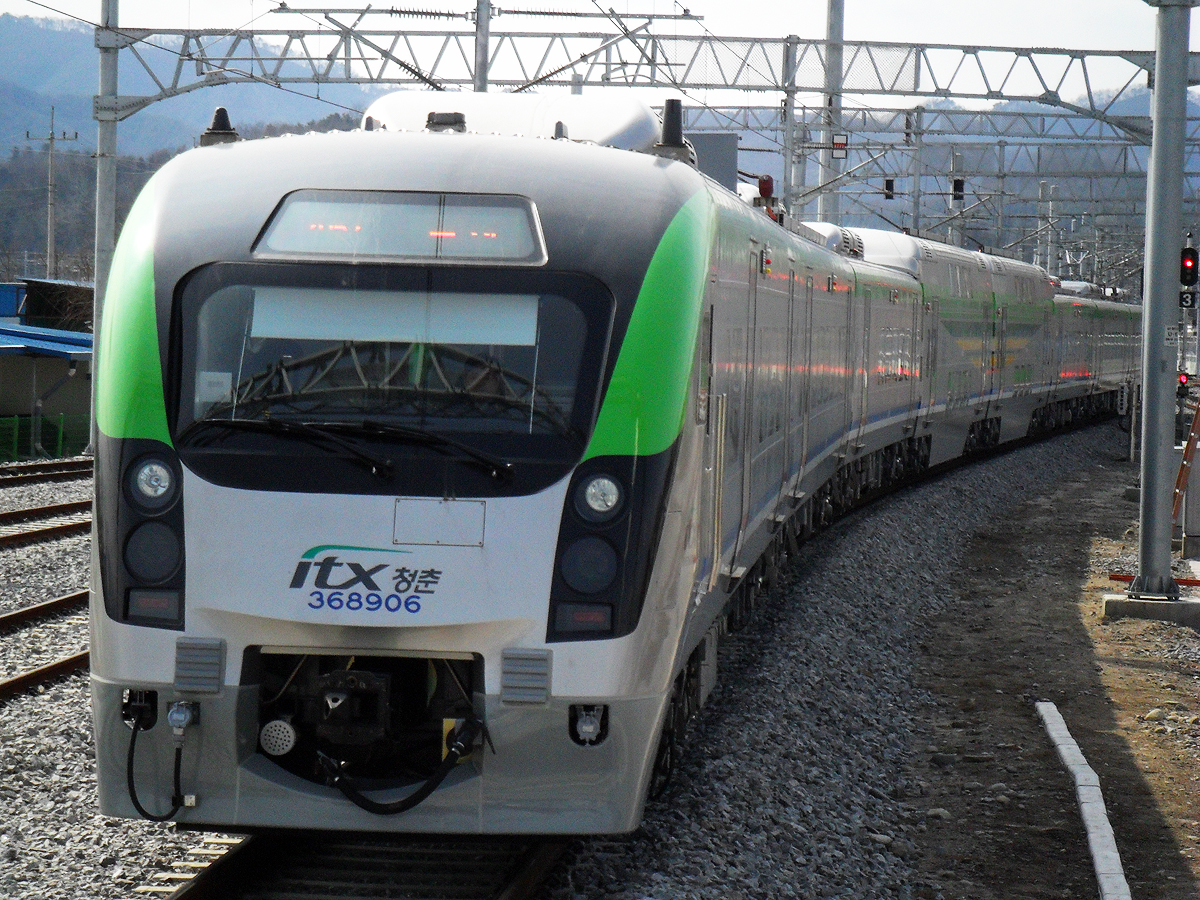
- In service: 28 February 2012; 14 years ago - present
- Manufacturer: Hyundai Rotem
- Constructed: 2009–2011
- Entered service: 2012
- Number built: 64 vehicles (8 sets)
- Number in service: 64 vehicles (8 sets)
- Capacity: 402 passengers
- Operator: Korail
- Line served: Gyeongchun Line

Specifications
- Car body construction: Stainless steel
- Train length: 162 m (531 ft 6 in)
- Car length: End cars: 20.405 m (66 ft 11.3 in); Intermediate cars: 19.5 m (64 ft 0 in)
- Width: 3.12 m (10 ft 3 in)
- Height: Single-decker cars: 3.75 m (12 ft 4 in); Double-decker cars: 4.19 m (13 ft 9 in)
- Maximum speed: Service: 180 km/h (112 mph); Design: 198 km/h (123 mph)
- Weight: 360 t (350 long tons; 400 short tons)
- Power output: 4,000 kW (5,364 hp)
- Deceleration: from 180 to 0 km/h (112 to 0 mph) in 1.2 km (0.7 mi)
- Power supply: 25 kV/60 Hz AC
- Electric system: Catenary
- Current collection: Single arm pantograph
- Safety systems: ATS, ATP(Ansaldo)
- Track gauge: 1,435 mm (4 ft 8 1/2 in) standard gauge

The Korail Class 368000 is one of the Rapid class of trains operated by Korail. It is manufactured by Hyundai Rotem and used on the ITX-Cheongchun Line. The doors are placed such that they fit the Korail metro screen doors on the Gyeongchun Line.

== Gallery ==
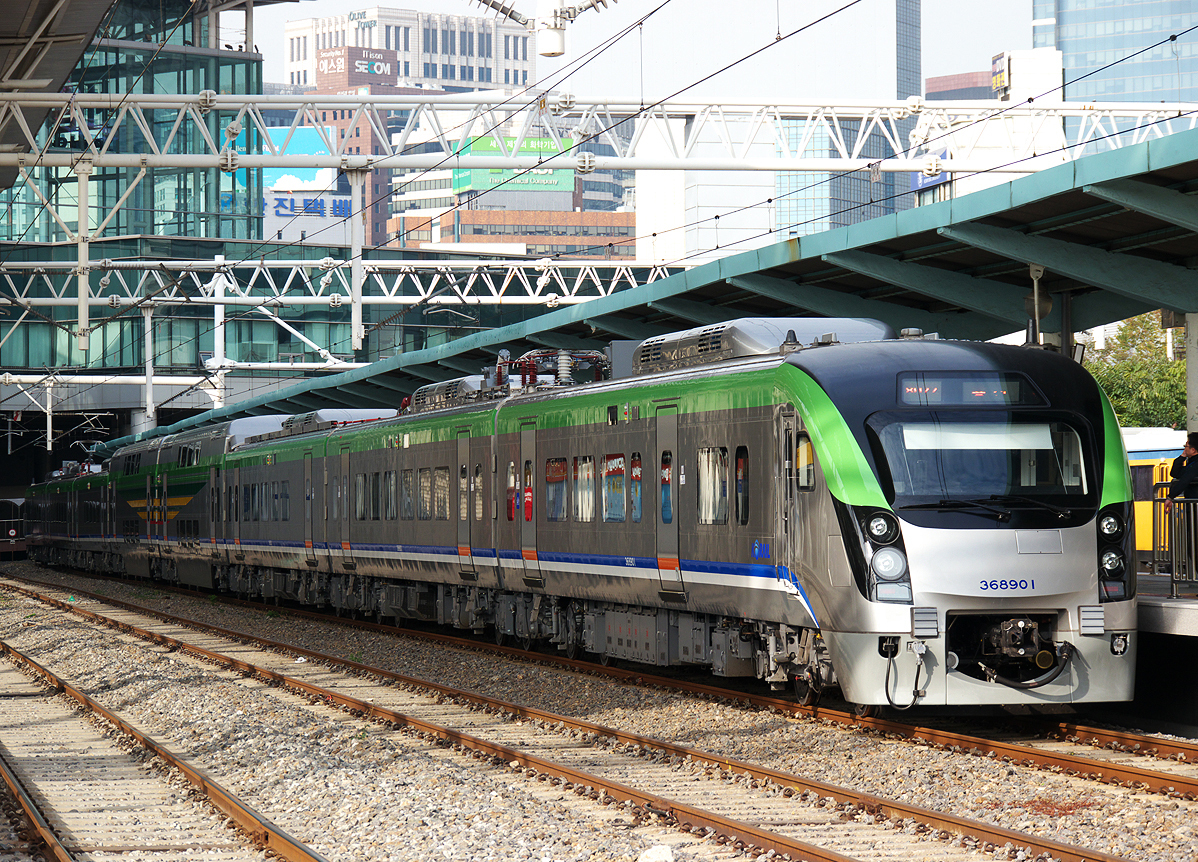
Trainset at Seoul station

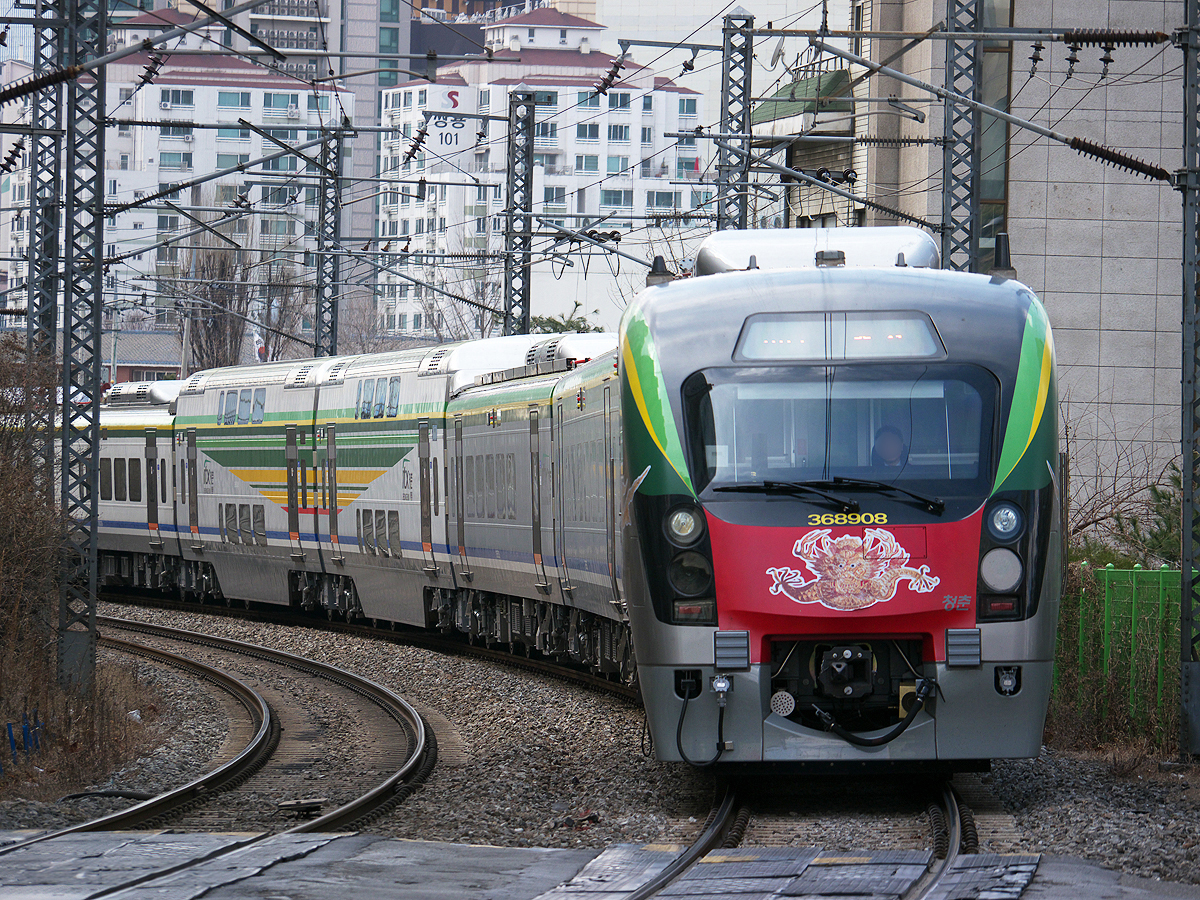
Trainset at Ichon station

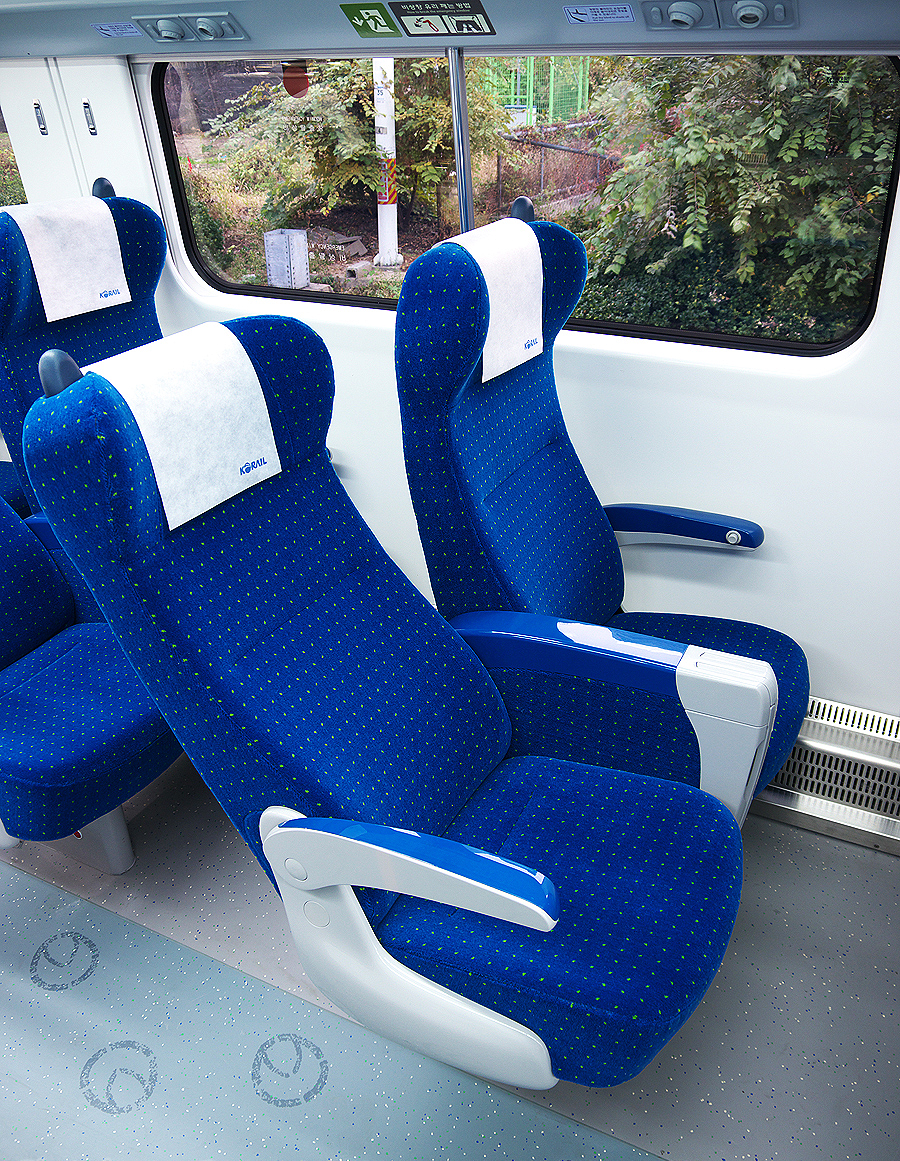
Train seats

== See also ==
- ITX-Cheongchun
