= Cheongnyangni station =

Train station in South Korea

청량리
Cheongnyangni
청량리; Cheongnyangni
청량리; Cheongnyangni
청량리 (서울시립대입구); Cheongnyangni (University of Seoul)
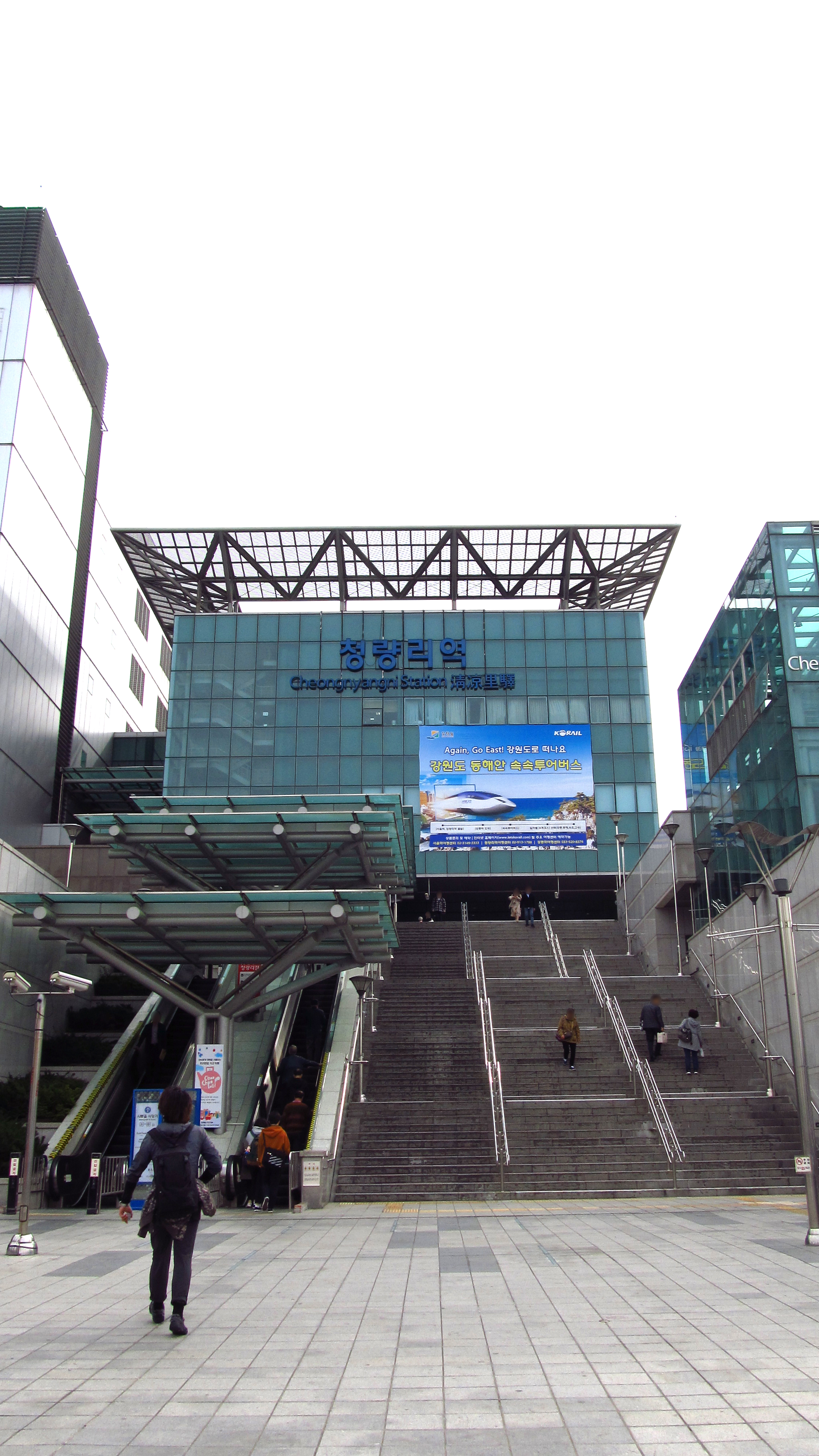
- Korail station building

Korean name
- Hangul: 청량리역
- Hanja: 淸凉里驛
- RR: Cheongnyangni-yeok
- MR: Ch'ŏngnyangni-yŏk

General information
- Location: 620-69 Jeonnong-dong, 205 Wangsanno Jiha, Dongdaemun-gu, Seoul
- Coordinates: 37°34′48″N 127°02′42″E
- Operator: Seoul Metro; Korail
- Lines: Yeongdong Line; Taebaek Line; Jungang Line; Gyeongchun Line
- Platforms: 8
- Tracks: 8

History
- Opened: October 15, 1911

Key dates
- August 15, 1974: Line 1 opened
- December 16, 2005: Gyeongui–Jungang Line opened
- September 26, 2016: Gyeongchun Line opened
- December 31, 2018: Suin–Bundang Line opened

Passengers
- (Daily) Based on Jan-Dec 2012. KR: 11,782; Line 1: 66,305; Jungang Line: 26,488
Services
Preceding station	Seoul Metropolitan Subway	Following station
Hoegi towards Kwangwoon University or Yeoncheon	Line 1	Jegi-dong towards Incheon, Seodongtan or Sinchang
Hoegi towards Dongducheon	Line 1 Gyeongwon Express	Jegi-dong towards Incheon
Terminus	Line 1 Gyeongbu Express	Jegi-dong towards Sinchang
Wangsimni towards Munsan	Gyeongui–Jungang Line	Hoegi towards Jipyeong
Wangsimni towards Munsan	Gyeongui–Jungang Line Gyeongui Express	Hoegi towards Yongmun
Wangsimni towards Munsan	Gyeongui–Jungang Line Jungang Express	Hoegi towards Yongmun
Terminus	Gyeongchun Line	Hoegi towards Chuncheon
Terminus	Gyeongchun Line Express	Hoegi towards Chuncheon
Terminus	Suin–Bundang Line	Wangsimni towards Incheon
Preceding station	Korea Train Express	Following station
Seoul towards Haengsin	Gangneung KTX	Sangbong towards Gangneung
Seoul Terminus	Gangneung KTX	Sangbong towards Donghae
Seoul Terminus	Jungang KTX	Sangbong towards Bujeon
Preceding station	Korail	Following station
Wangsimni towards Yongsan	ITX-Cheongchun	Sangbong towards Chuncheon
Terminus	ITX-Maum Taebaek Line	Wonju towards Donghae
Terminus	ITX-Maum Jungang Line	Deokso towards Bujeon
Terminus	Mugunghwa-ho Taebaek Line	Deokso towards Donghae
Terminus	Mugunghwa-ho Jungang Line	Deokso towards Yeongju
Location

Cheongnyangni station (Korean: 청량리역) is a major railway station located at Dongdaemun District, Seoul, South Korea. It serves as a terminus for passenger trains serving the eastern part of South Korea, with KTX, ITX-Cheongchun, and Mugunghwa-ho trains terminating or stopping at this station. The station also serves the Seoul Subway through Line 1, the Gyeongchun Line, the Suin-Bundang Line, and the Gyeongui-Jungang Line.

The Gyeongchun Line was extended from Sangbong station to Cheongnyangni station in September 2016, offering a transfer to Line 1, although only some services terminate here, with others terminating at Sangbong. A physical transfer between underground and aboveground stations opened on August 20, 2010.

Passenger trains serving the following Korail lines terminate at Cheongnyangni station:

- The Yeongdong Line and Taebaek Line to Gangneung, in Gangwon Province;
- The Jungang Line to Andong in North Gyeongsang Province and Busan, to the southeast of Seoul.

In addition, this station is served by all ITX trains to/from Chuncheon station on the Gyeongchun Line. However, the majority of trains do not terminate at this station but continue to Yongsan station.

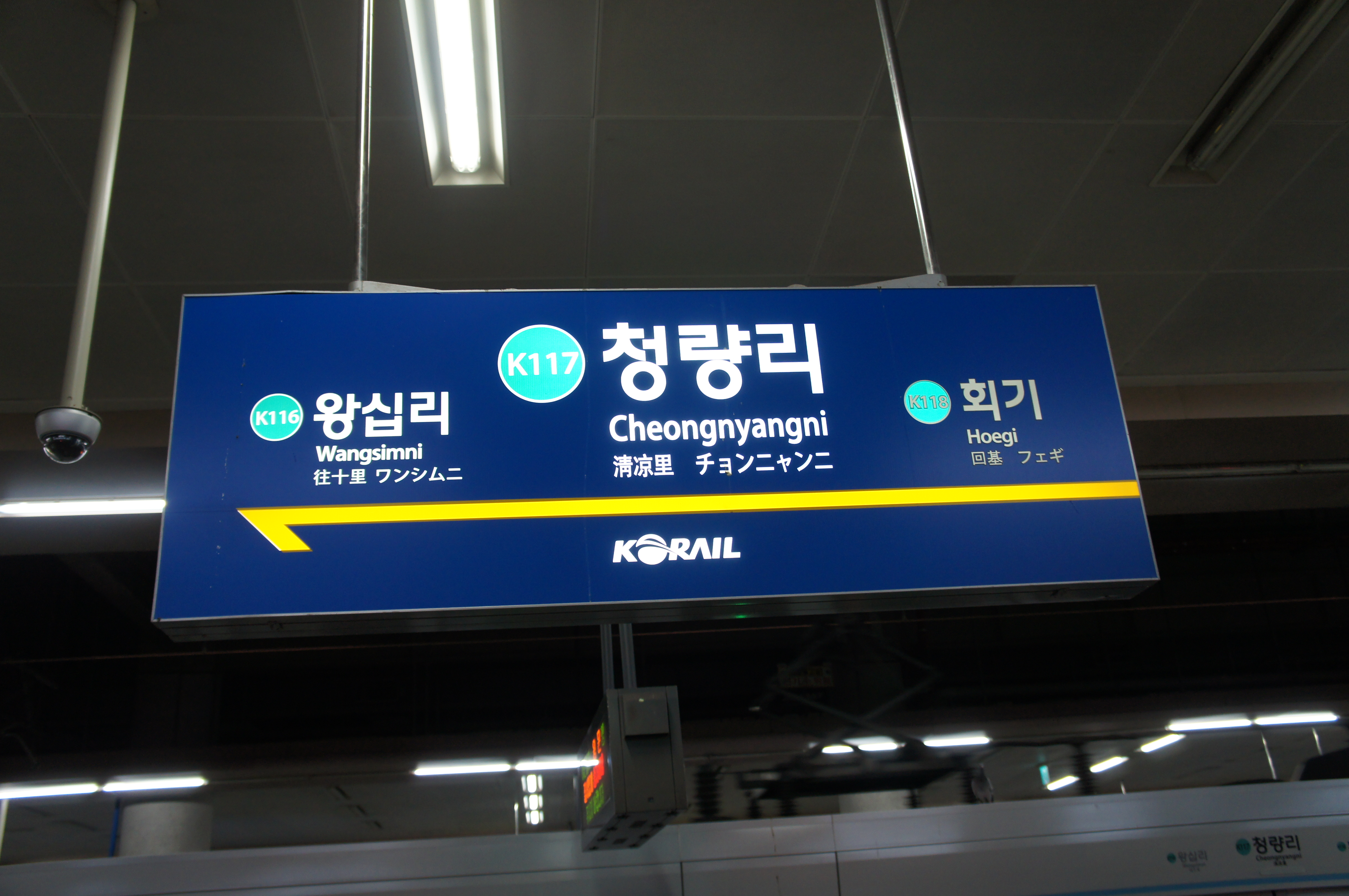

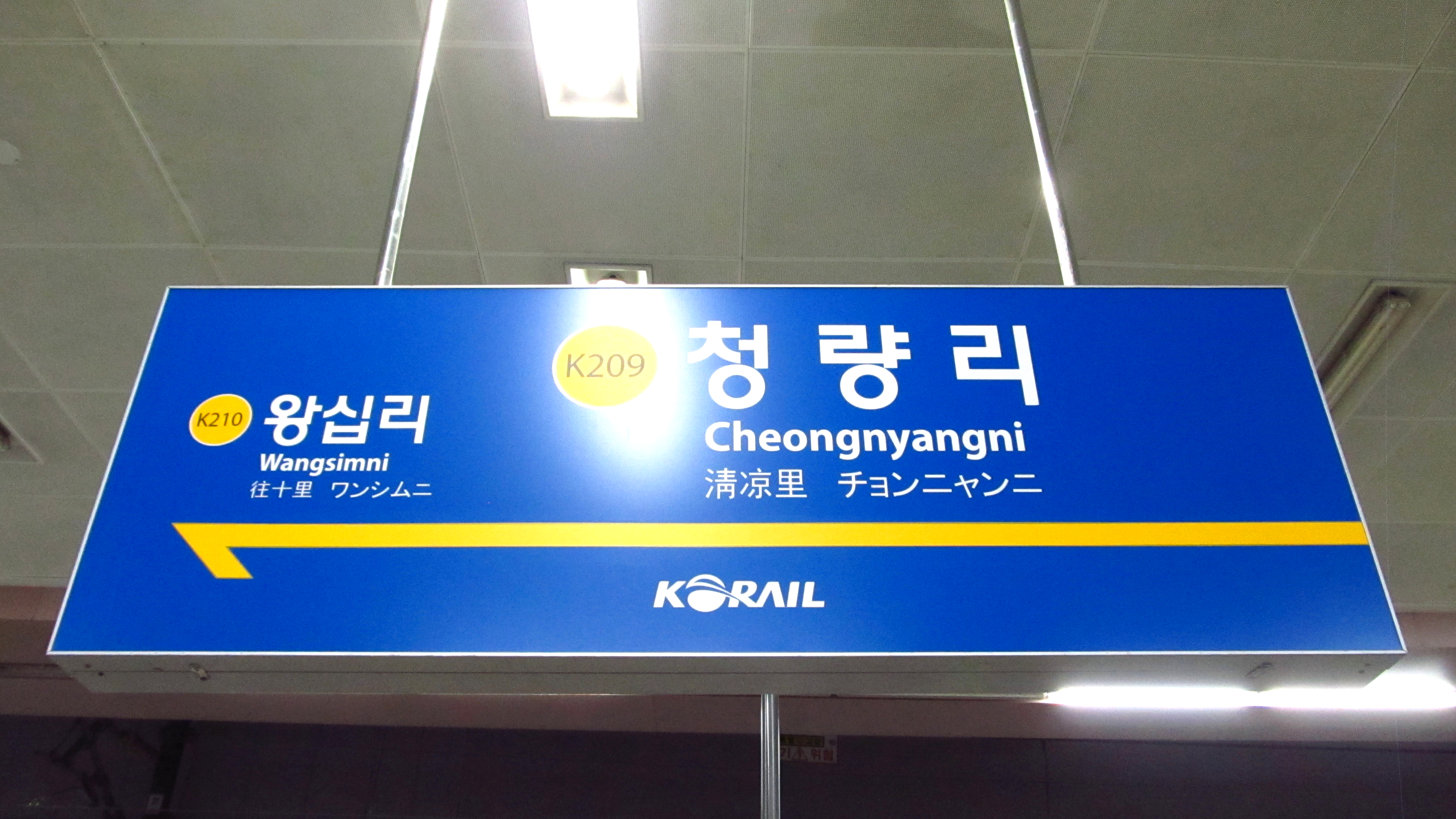

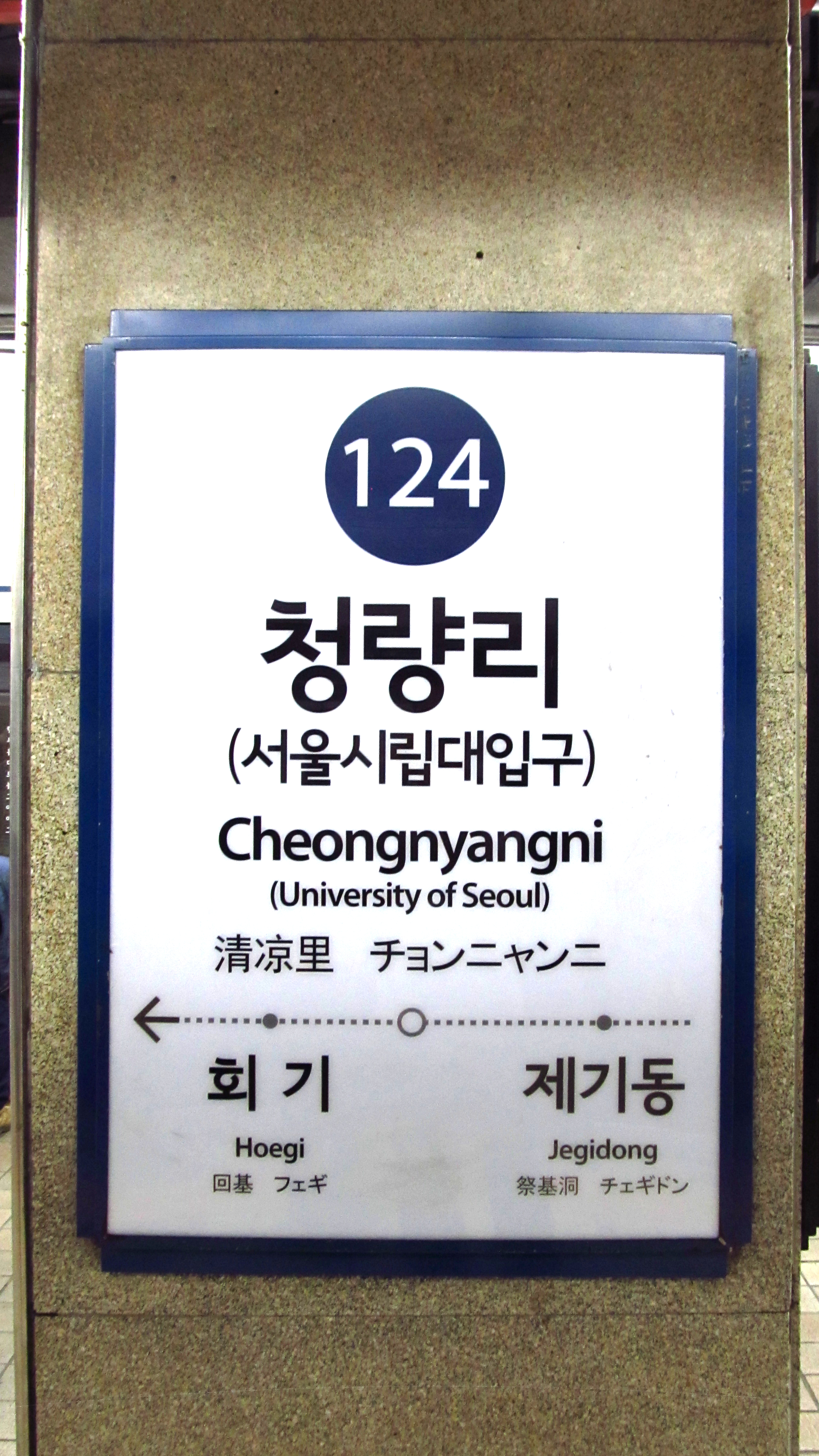

== Vicinity ==
=== Line 1 ===
- Exit 1: Cheongnyangni grocery market
- Exit 2:
- Exit 3: Miju APT
- Exit 4: Cheongnyangni train station
- Exit 5: Lotte Department Store Cheongnyangni
- Exit 6: St. Paul Hospital

=== Aboveground station ===
- Exit 1: Cheongnyangni subway station, Lotte Department Store Cheongnyangni

== See also ==
- Cheongnyangni 588, a red-light district
