= Chuncheon station =

Train station in Chuncheon, South Korea

춘천 (한림대)
Chuncheon
(Hallym Univ.)
춘천 (한림대); Chuncheon (Hallym Univ.)
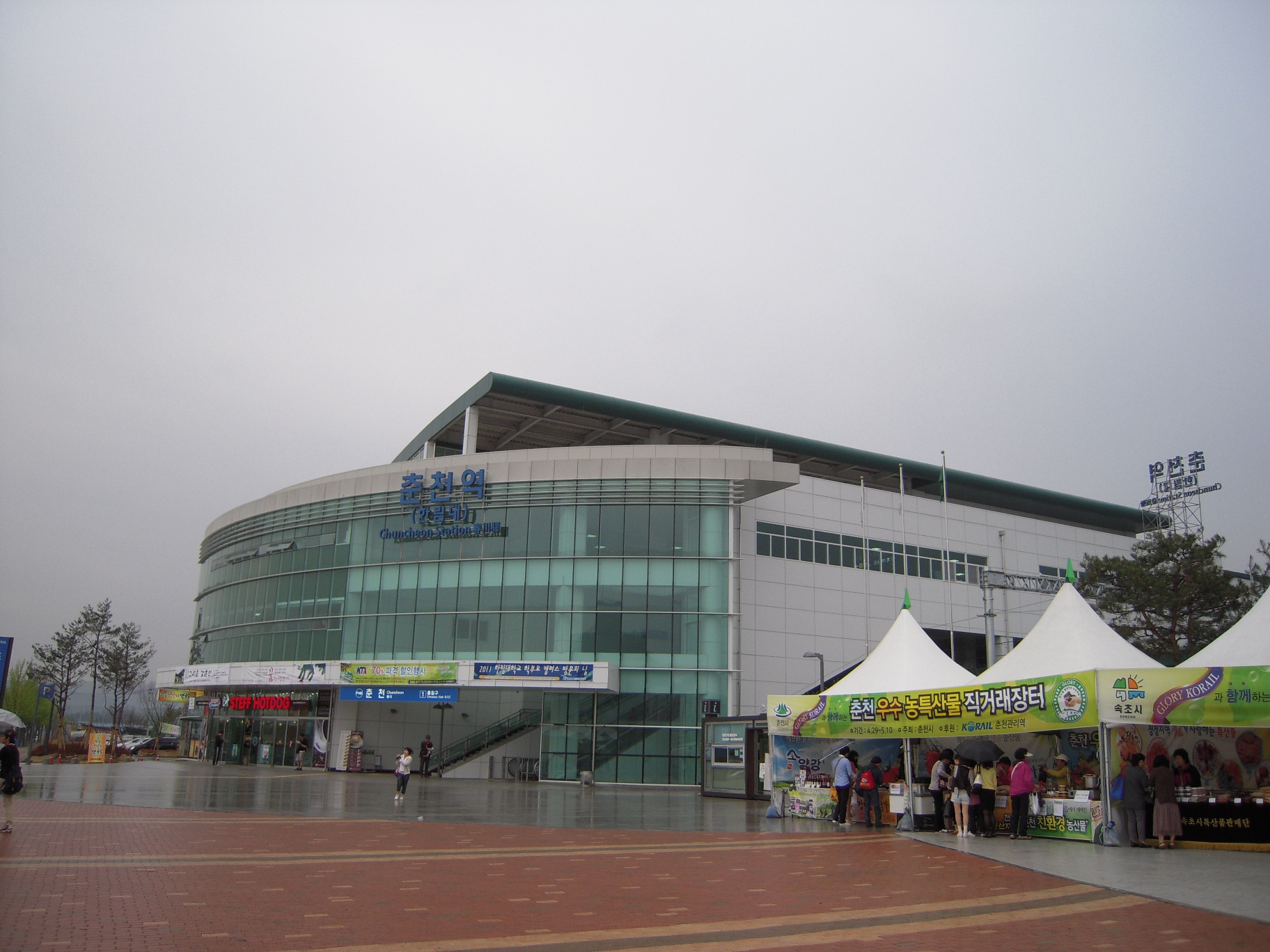

Korean name
- Hangul: 춘천역
- Hanja: 春川驛
- Revised Romanization: Chuncheon-nyeok
- McCune–Reischauer: Ch'unch'ŏn-nyŏk

General information
- Location: 190 Geunhwa-dong, 134 Geunhwaro, Chuncheon-si, Gangwon-do
- Coordinates: 37°53′5.27″N 127°43′0.87″E
- Operator: Korail
- Line: Gyeongchun Line
- Platforms: 2
- Tracks: 2

Construction
- Structure type: Aboveground

History
- Opened: December 21, 2010

Services
Preceding station	Seoul Metropolitan Subway	Following station
Namchuncheon towards Cheongnyangni or Kwangwoon University	Gyeongchun Line	Terminus
Namchuncheon towards Cheongnyangni	Gyeongchun Line Express	Terminus
Preceding station	Korail	Following station
Namchuncheon towards Yongsan	ITX-Cheongchun	Terminus
Location

Chuncheon station (Korean: 춘천역) is a railway station on, and the eastern terminus of the Gyeongchun Line in Geunhwa-dong, Chuncheon, Gangwon Province, South Korea. It was opened in 1939 as a regular train station and became a subway stop in 2010.

== Station layout ==
L1; Platforms
L1; Platforms	Eastbound	Gyeongchun Line Alighting Passengers Only →
L1; Platforms	Island platform, doors will open on the left
L1; Platforms	Eastbound	ITX-Cheongchun Alighting Passengers Only →
L1; Platforms	Westbound	← ITX-Cheongchun toward Yongsan (Namchuncheon)
L1; Platforms	Island platform, doors will open on the left
L1; Platforms	Westbound	← Gyeongchun Line toward Cheongnyangni or Kwangwoon Univ. (Namchuncheon)

L1; Concourse	Lobby	Customer Service, Shops, Vending machines, ATMs

G	Street level	Exit

== Gallery ==
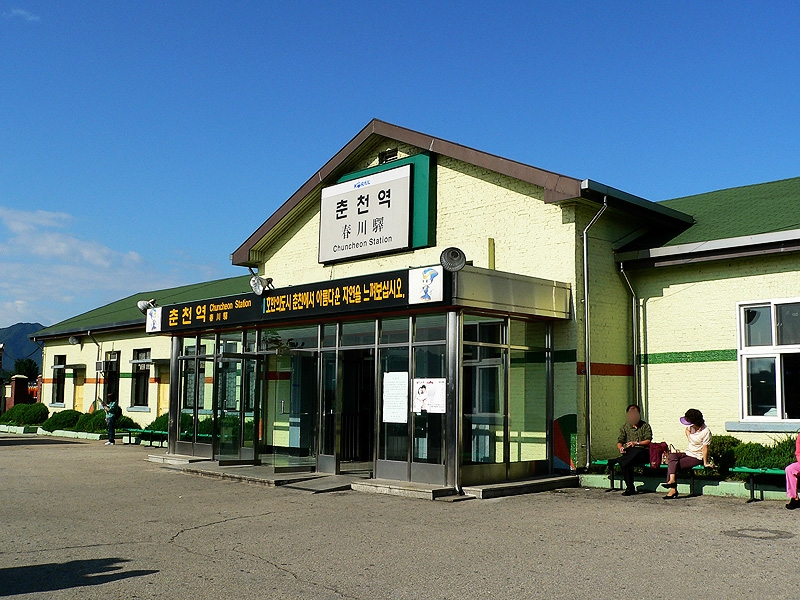
Old Chuncheon station

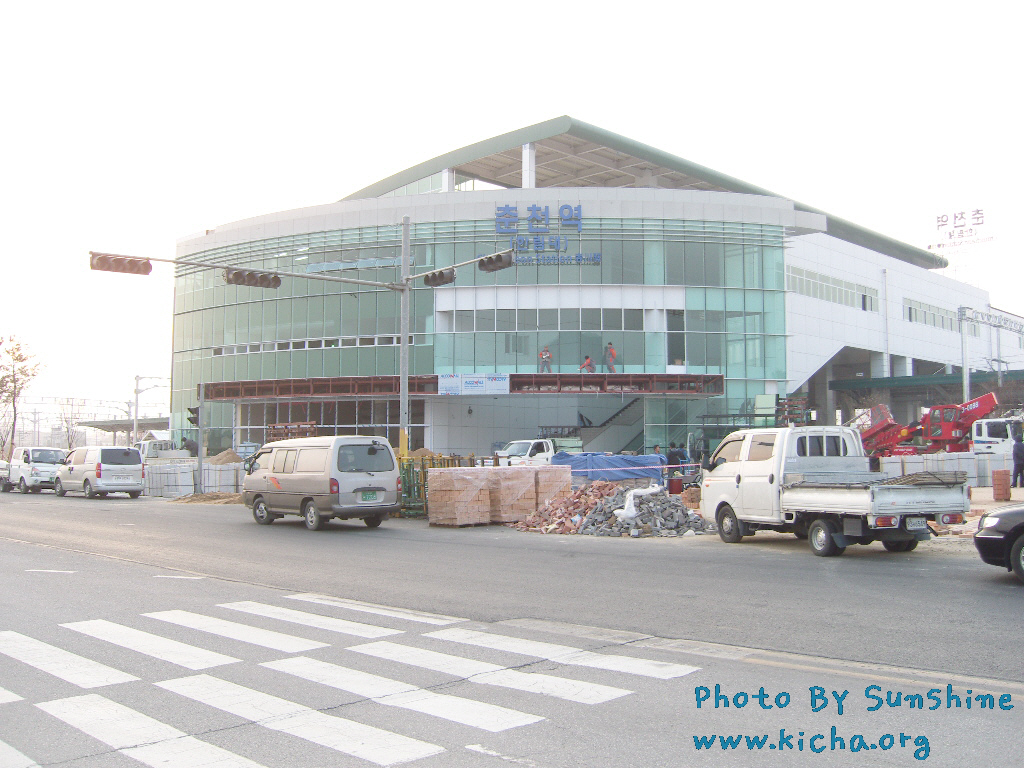
Construction of the new station

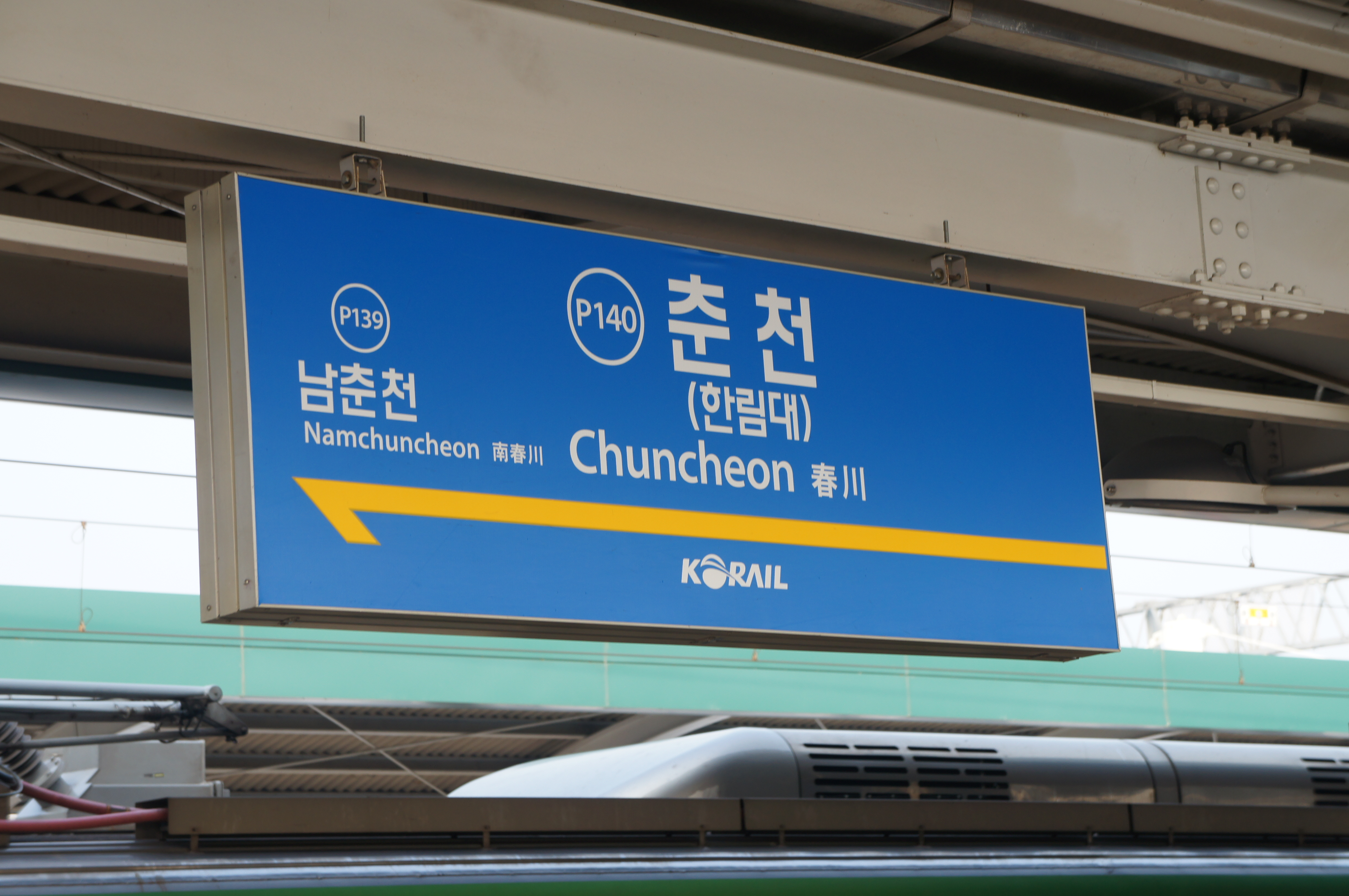
Station nameplate

== Around the station ==
- Hallym University
- Legoland Korea
