= Gyeongchun Line =

Railway line in South Korea

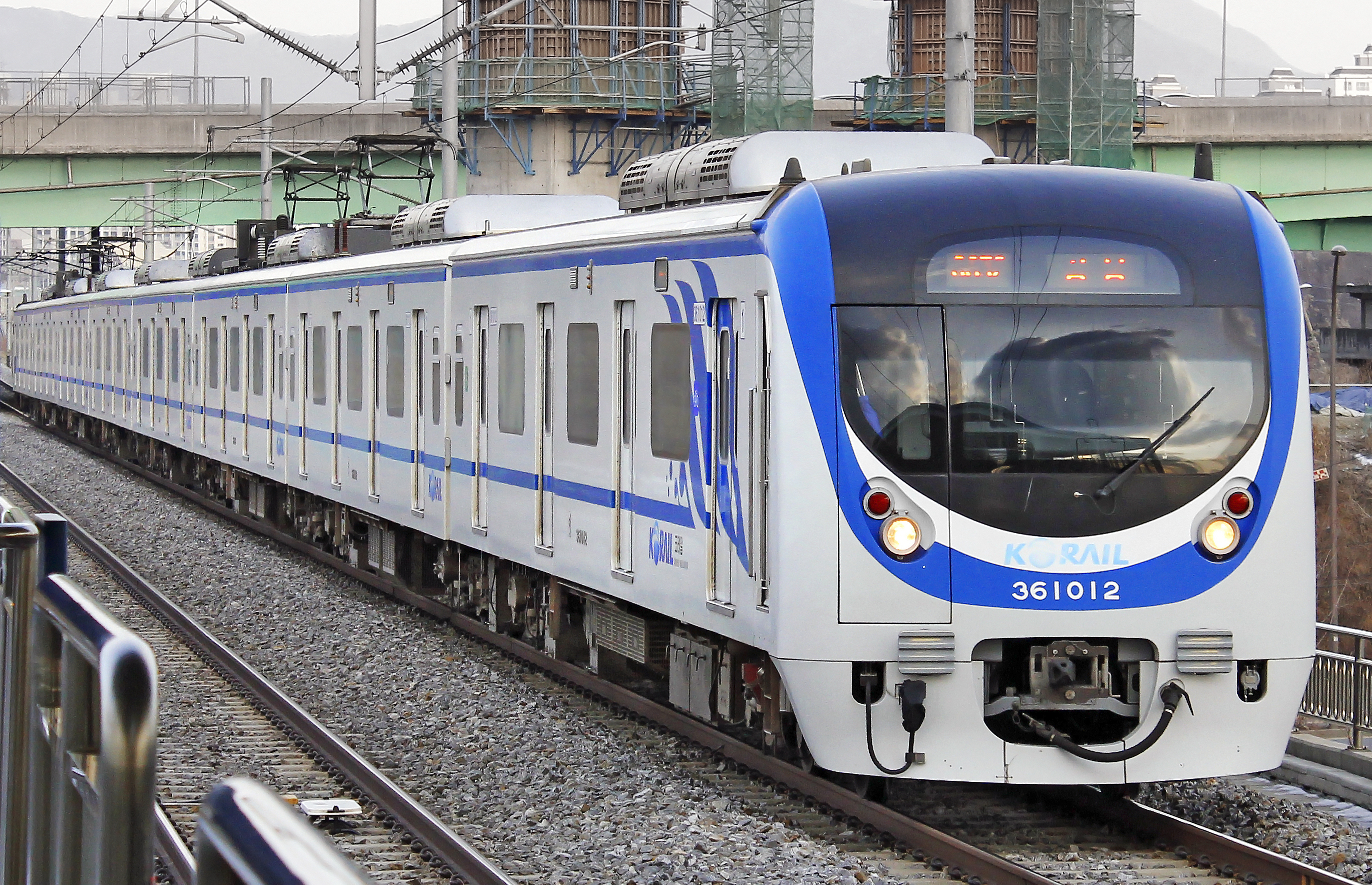
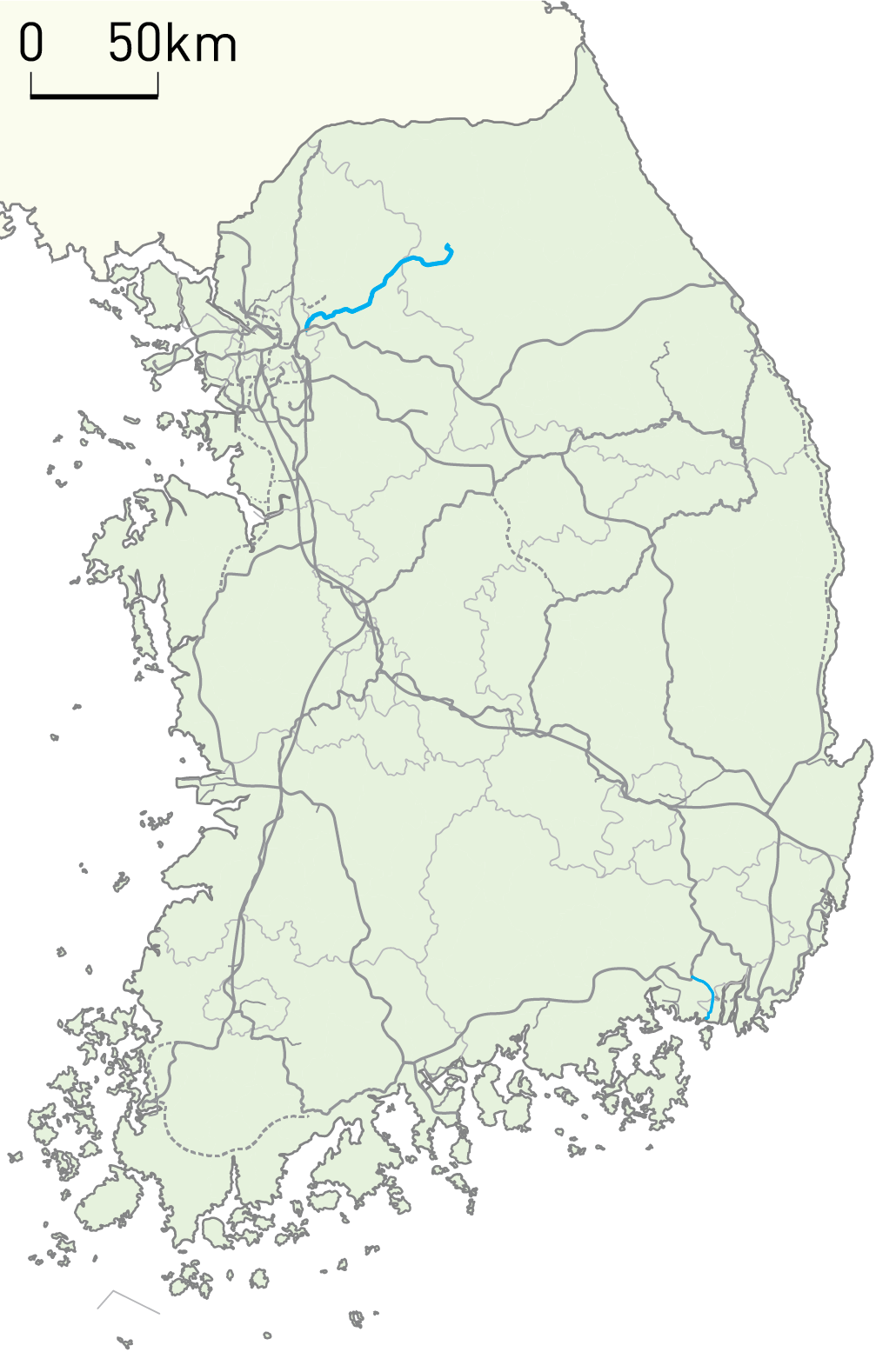

Overview
- Native name: 경춘선(京春線); Gyeongchunseon
- Status: Operational
- Owner: Korea Rail Network Authority
- Locale: Seoul; Gyeonggi; Gangwon (South Korea)
- Termini: Mangu Station Line; Chuncheon
- Stations: 20

Service
- Type: Heavy rail, Passenger rail Commuter rail, Intercity rail
- System: Seoul Metropolitan Subway
- Operator: Korail
- Rolling stock: Class 361000, ITX-Cheongchun, Mugunghwa-ho

History
- Opened: July 20, 1939 (original route); December 21, 2010 (realigned route)
- Closed: December 20, 2010 (original route)

Technical
- Track length: 80.7 km (50.1 mi)
- Num of tracks: Double track
- Track gauge: 1,435 mm (4 ft 8 1/2 in)
- Electrification: 25 kV/60 Hz AC catenary
- Operating speed: 180 km/h (112 mph) (ITX trains) / 110 km/h (68 mph) (commuter trains)

The Gyeongchun Line is a regional rail line between Seoul and Chuncheon, South Korea, operated by Korail. Its name is derived from Gyeongseong (京, meaning the capital, Seoul) and Chuncheon. It was completely reconstructed in the 2000s. Service on it has operated between Sangbong station on the Jungang Line in eastern Seoul and Chuncheon station, as part of the Seoul Metropolitan Subway system, since December 21, 2010. A class of regional rail service named ITX-Cheongchun began operations on February 28, 2012, linking Chuncheon to Cheongnyangni and Yongsan Stations.

== History ==
The original Gyeongchun Line was opened along its full length of 87.3 km (54.2 mi) between Kwangwoon University on the Gyeongwon Line to Chuncheon by the privately owned Gyeongchun Railway on 20 July 1939. Chuncheon was the most popular destination for students on orientation trips, bringing passengers to the line. Following the Liberation of Korea, all railways, including the Gyeongchun Railway, were nationalised.

=== Upgrade ===
The line was upgraded into an electrified and double-tracked line for 180 km/h (112 mph). Between Geumgok and Chuncheon, from 1997 until 2010, the line was re-laid in a straighter, 64.2 km long alignment with a budget of 2.151,931 billion won. The remaining 17.9 km of the upgraded line was built with a separate budget of 574.124 billion won. Towards Seoul, after Toegyewon station, this section of the new line diverges from the old alignment that ended in Seongbuk, and connects to the Jungang Line at Mangu station.

The new alignment was originally planned to be opened in 2004, but completion of the works was delayed for various reasons, including lack of funds. The complete new alignment opened and the old one closed on December 21, 2010.

Upgrade of Gyeongchun Line (Former alignment with red line and current alignment with blue line)

On September 1, 2010, the South Korean government announced a strategic plan to reduce travel times from Seoul to 95% of the country to under 2 hours by 2020. As part of the plan, the Gyeongchun Line is to be further upgraded for 230 km/h and may see KTX service. For the longer term, the government also considers to build a parallel high-speed line that would continue beyond Chuncheon to Sokcho on South Korea's east coast.

On November 4, 2016, two trains (one in the morning, one in the night) were added to the line. These trains run to and from Kwangwoon University station, allowing for transfers to Line 1. These trains take the Mangu Line Branch.

On September 26, 2016, the service was extended to Cheongnyangni station to improve access to regional trains (KTX, Seoul Metro Line 1) at the station. However, only 10 trains in each direction travel past Sangbong Station; the majority of the trains still terminate at Sangbong Station, and the two special rush-hour trains still run to and from Kwangwoon University Station.

== Services ==
=== Seoul Metropolitan Subway Gyeongchun Line ===
Seoul Metropolitan Subway Gyeongchun Line
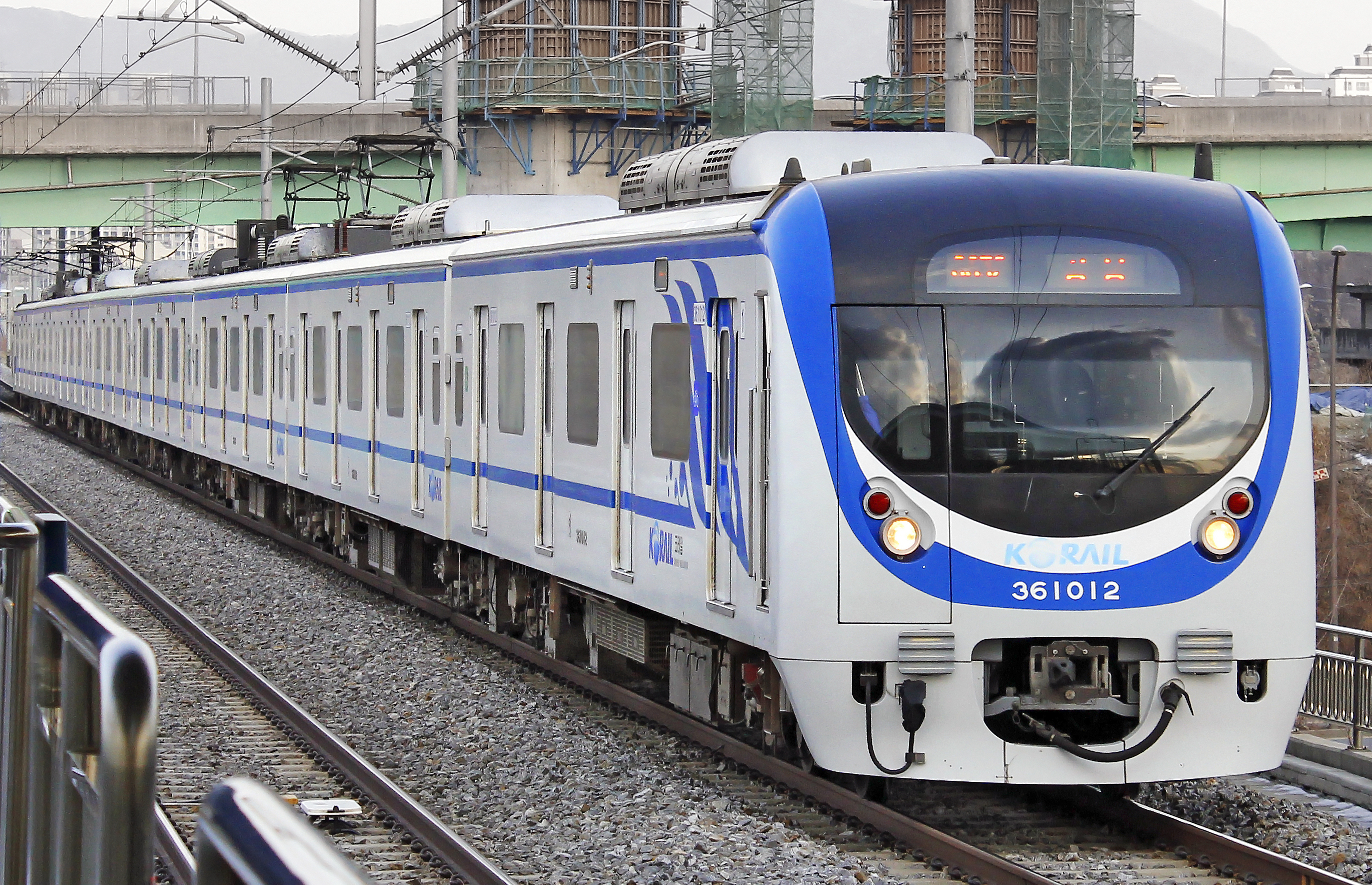
- Korail Class 361000 EMU

Overview
- Service type: Heavy rail, Passenger rail Commuter rail, Intercity rail
- Status: Operating
- Locale: Seoul; Gyeonggi; Gangwon (South Korea)
- First service: December 21, 2010
- Current operator: Korail

Route
- Termini: Sangbong, Kwangwoon University, Cheongnyangni; Chuncheon
- Stops: 21
- Distance travelled: 90 km
- Lines used: Jungang Line, Gyeongchun Line

On-board services
- Baggage facilities: Overhead racks baggage storage

Technical
- Rolling stock: Class 361000
- Track gauge: 1,435 mm (4 ft 8 1/2 in)
- Electrification: 25 kV/60 Hz catenary
- Operating speed: 180 km/h (112 mph)

When the new Gyeongchun Line was opened on December 21, 2010, passenger service was integrated into the Seoul Metropolitan Subway system as a name of Seoul Metropolitan Subway Gyeongchun Line (수도권 전철 경춘선). It brings that the system from Seoul all the way into Gangwon Province. The new service reduced travel time between Chuncheon and Sangbong in Seoul from two hours to 89 minutes, with different trains operating according to different stopping patterns; and increased capacity five-fold. Compared to the previous Mugunghwa-ho train service on the Gyeongchun Line, fares were reduced by half. For the service, Hyundai Rotem supplied Korail with fifteen eight-car Class 361000 EMU trains, out of which only fourteen trains remain in service on the line today.

Currently, Seoul Metropolitan Subway Gyeongchun Line serves mainly Sangbong station to Chuncheon station. Rare service to Cheongnyangni or Kwangwoon University station is also available, making it a Y-shaped line.

=== ITX-Cheongchun service ===
On February 28, 2012, Korail introduced the ITX-Cheongchun service (Intercity Train EXpress), which uses Class 368000 trains with double-deck cars. From Chuncheon Station, the fastest ITX trains take 52 minutes to Cheongnyangni station, and 68 minutes to Yongsan station in Seoul, operating at a maximum speed of 180 km/h (112 mph). The base fare is 9,800 won between Chuncheon and Yongsan, but Korail offers 15% discount at all time resulting price of 8,300 won. Basic discount rate was 30% until July 31, 2016, 25% until July 31, 2018, 15% since August 1, 2018.

=== Mugunghwa service ===
Some special Mugunghwa trains which deploy military troops takes the Gyeongchun Line.

== Service Route ==
=== Current Services ===
==== Main Line ====
The following stations are along the Gyeongui-Jungang Line and the Gyeongchun Line itself.

The negative sign is only a convention for distance notation from Sangbong Station, the terminus of most services.

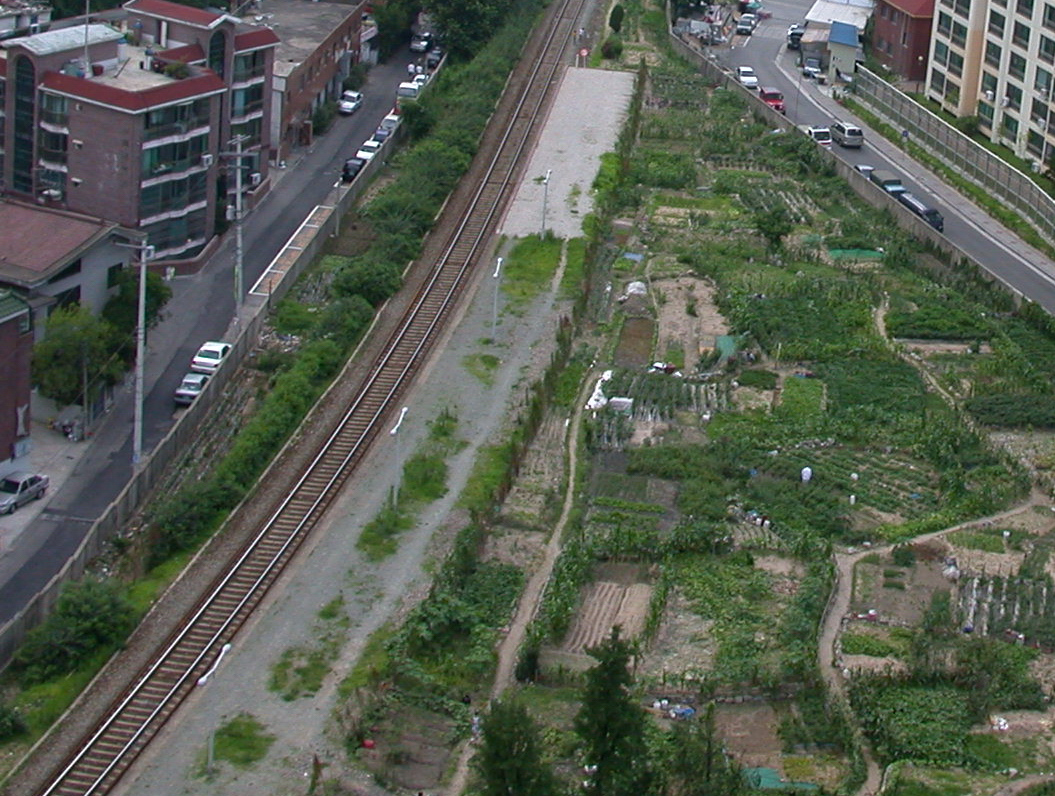
Abandoned platform of Singongdeok station, Gyeongchun line

=== Current Routes ===
- Sangbong — Chuncheon (most trains)
- Cheongnyangni — Chuncheon (selected trains)
- Chuncheon — Kwangwoon Univ (limited service)
- Yongsan — Chuncheon (ITX Cheongchun)

=== Stations ===
| Station number | Station name | | | ITX-Cheongchun (Limited Express) | Express | Local | Transfer | | Line name | Station dist. | Total dist. | Location | |
| Station number | Romanized | Hangul | Hanja | ITX-Cheongchun (Limited Express) | Express | Local | Transfer | | Line name | in km | | Location | |
|---|---|---|---|---|---|---|---|---|---|---|---|---|---|
| K117 | Cheongnyangni | 청량리 | 淸凉里 | ● | ● | ○ | Gyeongui–Jungang (shared) | Mugunghwa-ho, ITX-Saemaeul and Nuriro services | Jungang; Line | --- | -4.0 | Seoul | Dongdaemun-gu |
| K118 | Hoegi | 회기 | 回基 | | | ● | ○ | Gyeongui–Jungang (shared) | Seoul Subway Line 1 | Jungang; Line | 1.4 | -2.6 | Seoul | Dongdaemun-gu |
| K119 | Jungnang | 중랑 | 中浪 | | | | | ○ | Gyeongui–Jungang (shared) | | Jungang; Line | 1.8 | -0.8 | Seoul | Jungnang District |
| K120 | Sangbong | 상봉 | 上鳳 | ▲ | ● | ● | Gyeongui–Jungang (shared) | Mangu Line branch trains | Jungang; Line | 0.8 | 0.0 | Seoul | Jungnang District |
| K121 | Mangu | 망우 | 忘憂 | | | | | ● | Gyeongui–Jungang Line | | Jungang; Line | 0.6 | 0.6 | Seoul | Jungnang District |
| P122 | Sinnae | 신내 | 新內 | | | ● | ● | Seoul Subway Line 6 | | Gyeongchun; Line | 2.1 | 2.7 | Seoul | Jungnang District |
| P123 | Galmae | 갈매 | 葛梅 | | | ● | ● | | | Gyeongchun; Line | 2.6 | 5.3 | Gyeonggi Province | Guri-si |
| P124 | Byeollae | 별내 | 別內 | | | ● | ● | Seoul Subway Line 8 | | Gyeongchun; Line | 1.4 | 6.7 | Gyeonggi Province | Namyangju |
| P125 | Toegyewon | 퇴계원 | 退溪院 | ▲ | ● | ● | | | Gyeongchun; Line | 1.6 | 8.3 | Gyeonggi Province | Namyangju |
| P126 | Sareung | 사릉 | 思陵 | ▲ | ● | ● | | | Gyeongchun; Line | 3.3 | 11.6 | Gyeonggi Province | Namyangju |
| P127 | Geumgok | 금곡 | 金谷 | | | | | ● | | | Gyeongchun; Line | 3.6 | 15.2 | Gyeonggi Province | Namyangju |
| P128 | PyeongnaeHopyeong | 평내호평 | 坪內好坪 | ○ | ● | ● | | | Gyeongchun; Line | 4.0 | 19.2 | Gyeonggi Province | Namyangju |
| P129 | Cheonmasan | 천마산 | 天摩山 | | | | | ● | | | Gyeongchun; Line | 4.2 | 23.4 | Gyeonggi Province | Namyangju |
| P130 | Maseok | 마석 | 磨石 | ▲ | ● | ● | | | Gyeongchun; Line | 2.2 | 25.6 | Gyeonggi Province | Namyangju |
| P131 | Daeseong-ri | 대성리 | 大成里 | | | | | ● | | | Gyeongchun; Line | 7.4 | 33.0 | Gyeonggi Province | Gapyeong County |
| P132 | Cheongpyeong | 청평 | 淸平 | ○ | ● | ● | | | Gyeongchun; Line | 7.5 | 40.5 | Gyeonggi Province | Gapyeong County |
| P133 | Sangcheon | 상천 | 上泉 | | | | | ● | | | Gyeongchun; Line | 4.8 | 45.3 | Gyeonggi Province | Gapyeong County |
| P134 | Gapyeong | 가평 | 加平 | ● | ● | ● | | | Gyeongchun; Line | 7.1 | 52.4 | Gyeonggi Province | Gapyeong County |
| P135 | Gulbongsan | 굴봉산 | 屈峰山 | | | | | ● | | | Gyeongchun; Line | 4.7 | 57.1 | Gangwon Province | Chuncheon |
| P136 | Baegyang-ri | 백양리 | 白楊里 | | | | | ● | | | Gyeongchun; Line | 2.9 | 60.0 | Gangwon Province | Chuncheon |
| P137 | Gangchon | 강촌 | 江村 | ○ | ● | ● | | | Gyeongchun; Line | 5.3 | 65.3 | Gangwon Province | Chuncheon |
| P138 | Gimyujeong | 김유정 | 金裕貞 | | | | | ● | | | Gyeongchun; Line | 7.4 | 72.7 | Gangwon Province | Chuncheon |
| P139 | Namchuncheon | 남춘천 | 南春川 | ● | ● | ● | | | Gyeongchun; Line | 5.9 | 78.6 | Gangwon Province | Chuncheon |
| P140 | Chuncheon | 춘천 | 春川 | ● | ● | ● | | | Gyeongchun; Line | 2.7 | 81.3 | Gangwon Province | Chuncheon |
ITX-Cheongchun: Intercity Train Express, Cheongchun: ●: regular stop; ▲: limited service (weekdays only); ○: limited service; | : all trains pass

==== Mangu Line Branch (very limited service) ====
| Station number | Station name | | | Transfer | Line name | Station dist. | Total dist. | Location | |
| Station number | English | Hangul | Hanja | Transfer | Line name | in km | | Location | |
|---|---|---|---|---|---|---|---|---|---|
| 119 | Kwangwoon University | 광운대 | 光云大 | Seoul Subway Line 1 | Mangu; Line | — | -4.3 | Seoul | Nowon District |
| K120 | Sangbong | 상봉 | 上鳳 | Gyeongui–Jungang Line | Mangu; Line | 0.0 | 4.3 | Seoul | Jungnang District |

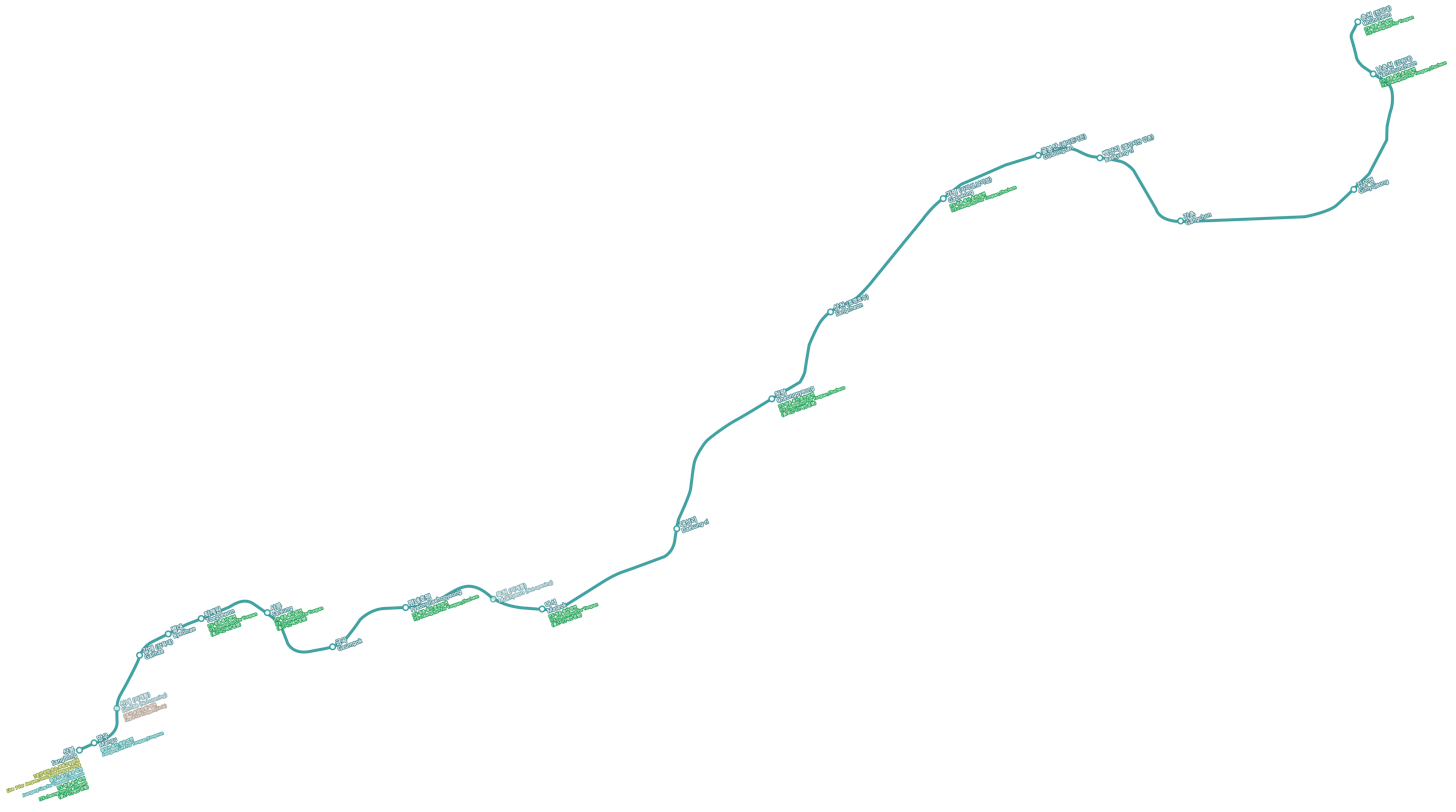
Seoul Metropolitan Subway Gyeongchun Line

=== Former alignment ===
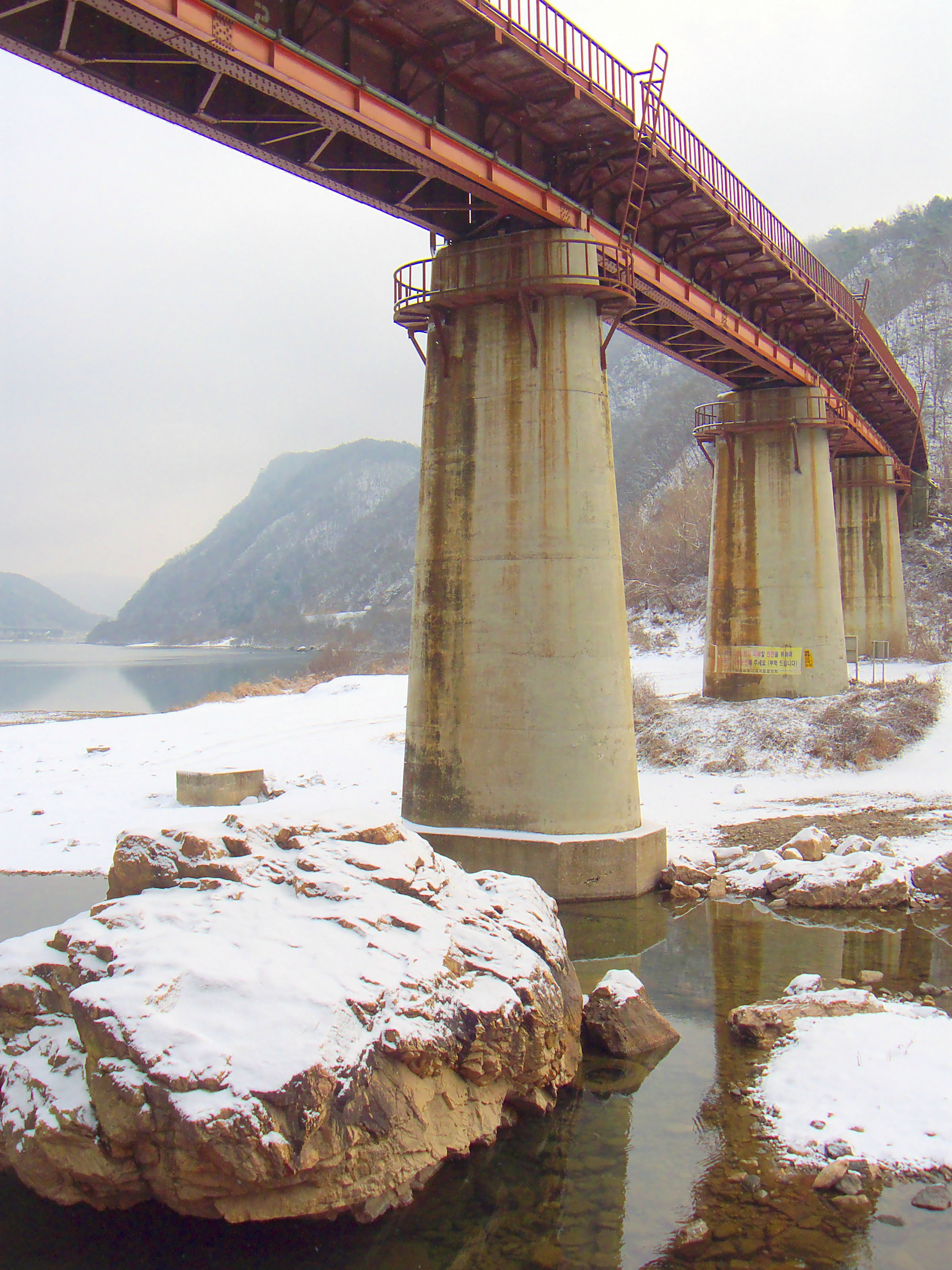
Trestle on the old Gyeongchun Line

| Station name | | | Connecting services | Station type |
| Romanized | Hangul | Hanja | Connecting services | Station type |
|---|---|---|---|---|
| Kwangwoon Univ. | 광운대 | 光云大 | via Gyeongwon | Aboveground |
| Singongdeok | 신공덕 | 新孔德 | | Aboveground |
| Hwarangdae | 화랑대 | 花郞臺 | | Aboveground |
| Toegyewon | 퇴계원 | 退溪院 | | Aboveground |
| Sareung | 사릉 | 思陵 | | Aboveground |
| Geumgok | 금곡 | 金谷 | | Aboveground |
| PyeongnaeHopyeong | 평내호평 | 坪內好坪 | | Aboveground |
| Maseok | 마석 | 磨石 | | Aboveground |
| Daeseong-ri | 대성리 | 大成里 | | Aboveground |
| Cheongpyeong | 청평 | 淸平 | | Aboveground |
| Sangcheon | 상천 | 上泉 | | Aboveground |
| Gapyeong | 가평 | 加平 | | Aboveground |
| Gulbongsan | 굴봉산 | 屈峰山 | | Aboveground |
| Baegyang-ri | 백양리 | 白楊里 | | Aboveground |
| Gangchon | 강촌 | 江村 | | Aboveground |
| Gimyujeong | 김유정 | 金裕貞 | | Aboveground |
| Namchuncheon | 남춘천 | 南春川 | | Aboveground |
| Chuncheon | 춘천 | 春川 | | Aboveground |
| Gosangjeon | 고상전 | 高商前 | | Aboveground |

== See also ==
- Korail
- Transportation in South Korea
