= Kwangwoon University station =

Train station in South Korea

광운대; Kwangwoon Univ.
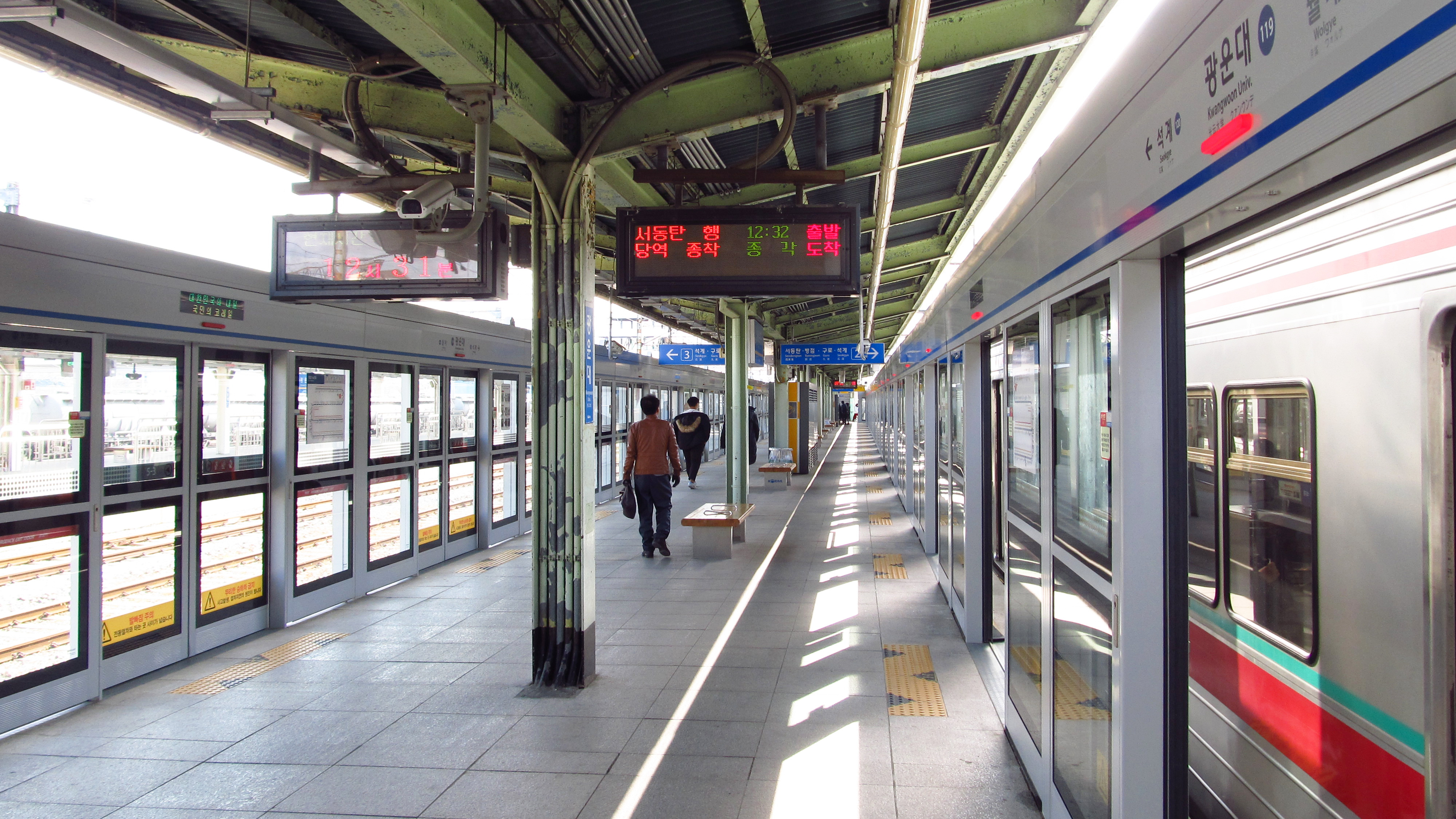
- Station Platform (Line 1)

Korean name
- Hangul: 광운대역
- Hanja: 光云大驛
- Revised Romanization: Gwangundae-yeok
- McCune–Reischauer: Kwangundae-yŏk

General information
- Location: 85 Wolgye-dong, 98-2 Seokgyero, Nowon-gu, Seoul; South Korea
- Coordinates: 37°37′23″N 127°03′41″E
- Operator: Korail
- Line: Gyeongwon Line
- Platforms: 3
- Tracks: 5

Construction
- Structure type: Aboveground

History
- Opened: July 25, 1939
- Former names: Seongbuk

Key dates
- August 15, 1974: Line 1 opened
- November 4, 2013: Gyeongchun Line opened

Passengers
- Based on Jan-Dec of 2012. Line 1: 20,501
Services
Preceding station	Seoul Metropolitan Subway	Following station
Wolgye towards Yeoncheon	Line 1	Seokgye towards Incheon
Terminus	Line 1	Seokgye towards Sinchang or Seodongtan
Chang-dong towards Dongducheon	Line 1 Gyeongwon Express	Seokgye towards Incheon
Terminus	Gyeongchun Line	Sangbong towards Chuncheon
Location

Kwangwoon University station (formerly Seongbuk station) is a train station on Seoul Subway Line 1, Gyeongchun Line and Gyeongwon Line in Seoul, South Korea operated by Korail. Together with Incheon station and Suwon station, this station was one of the three termini of Line 1 when it opened in 1974. Seongbuk Depot, one of the five depots of Line 1, is located nearby.

== Renaming ==
Seongbuk station was renamed to Kwangwoon University station on February 25, 2013.
