= Baegyang-ri station =

Station of the Seoul Metropolitan Subway

백양리 (엘리시안강촌); Baegyang-ri (Elysian Gangchon)
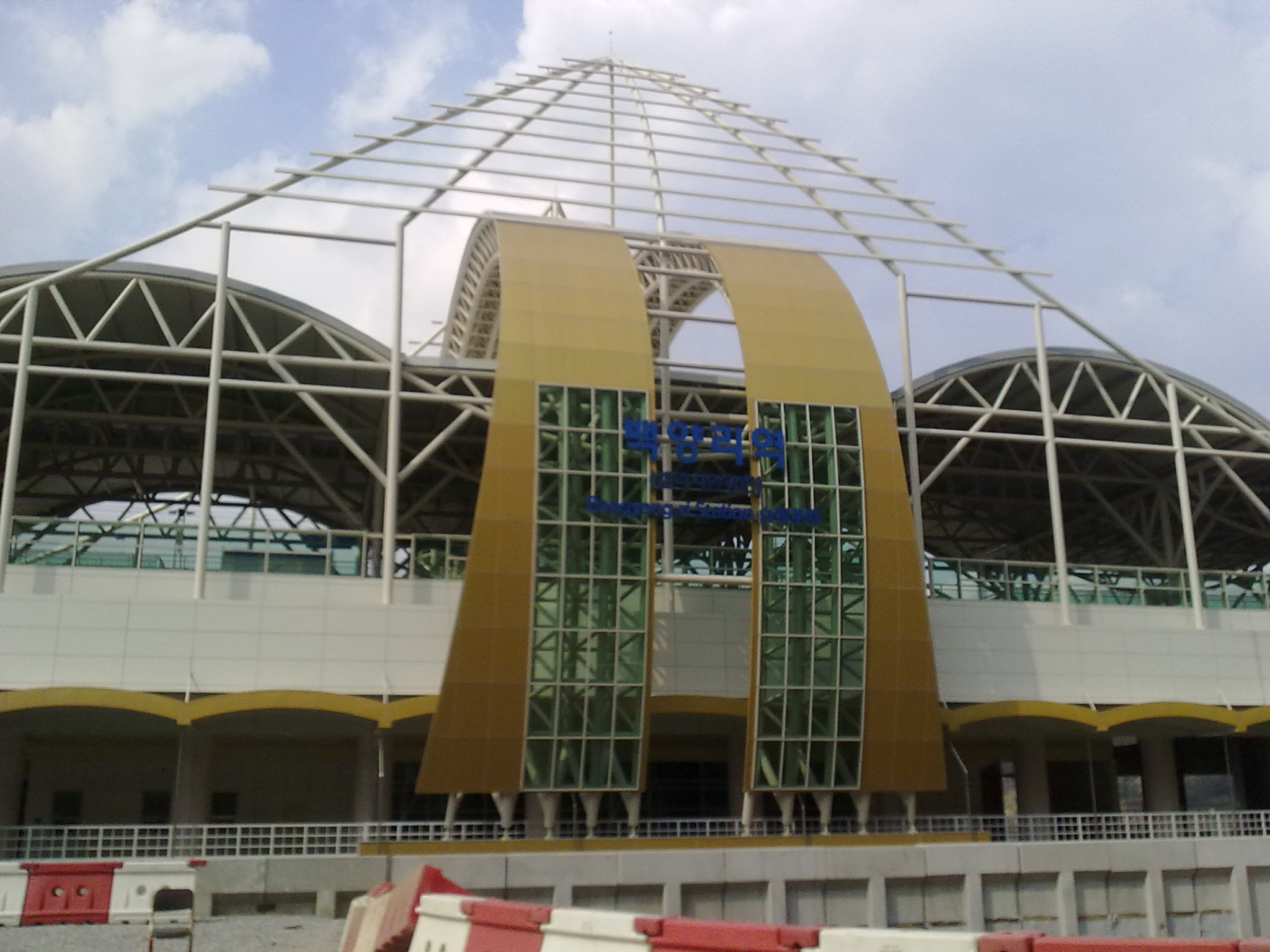

Korean name
- Hangul: 백양리역
- Hanja: 白楊里驛
- RR: Baegyang-ri-yeok
- MR: Paegyang-ri-yŏk

General information
- Location: 586 Gangchonni, 910-14 Bukhangangbyeongil, Namsan-myeon, Chuncheon-si, Gangwon-do
- Coordinates: 37.82667°N 127.61255°E
- Operator: Korail
- Line: Gyeongchun Line
- Platforms: 2
- Tracks: 2

Construction
- Structure type: Aboveground

History
- Opened: December 21, 2010

Services
Preceding station	Seoul Metropolitan Subway	Following station
Gulbongsan towards Cheongnyangni or Kwangwoon University	Gyeongchun Line	Gangchon towards Chuncheon
Location

Baegyang-ri station (Korean: 백양리역) is a railway station of the Gyeongchun Line in Namsan-myeon, Chuncheon, Gangwon Province, South Korea. Its station subname is Elysian Gangchon where the entrance to Elysian Gangchon is nearby and is located at the Bukhan River.

== Services ==
During the winter ski season, ITX-Cheongchun runs that can board at Yongsan, Wangsimni, and Cheongnyangni every weekend, However, if ITX-Cheongchun stops at this station, go directly to Namchuncheon station without stopping at Gangchon station.

== Station layout ==
L2; Platforms	Side platform, doors will open on the left
L2; Platforms	Eastbound	Gyeongchun Line toward Chuncheon (Gangchon) →
L2; Platforms	Westbound	← Gyeongchun Line toward Cheongnyangni or Kwangwoon Univ. (Gulbongsan)
L2; Platforms	Side platform, doors will open on the left

L1; Concourse	Lobby	Customer service, shops, vending machines, ATMs

G	Street level	Exit

== Gallery ==
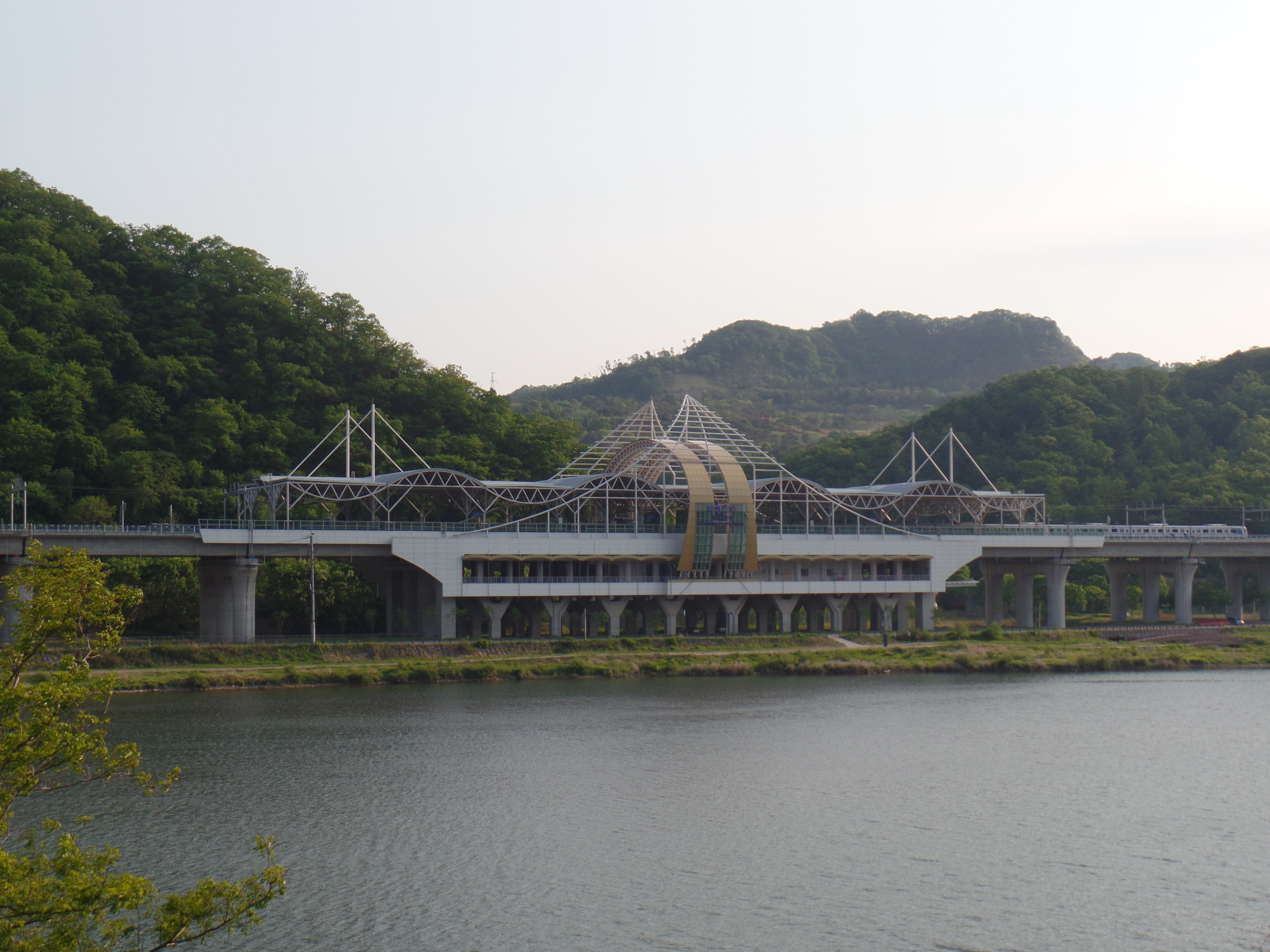
View of the Baegyang-ri station at Bukhan River.
