= Gulbongsan station =

Train station in South Korea

굴봉산; Gulbongsan
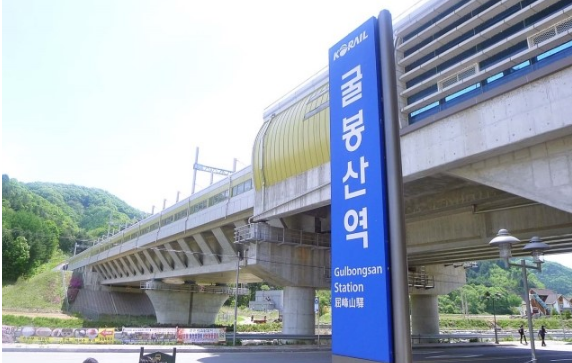

Korean name
- Hangul: 굴봉산역
- Hanja: 屈峰山驛
- Revised Romanization: Gulbongsanyeok
- McCune–Reischauer: Kulbongsanyŏk

General information
- Location: 226-6 Seocheolli, 57 Seobaekgil, Namsan-myeon, Chuncheon-si, Gangwon-do
- Coordinates: 37.84300°N 127.55035°E
- Operator: Korail
- Line: Gyeongchun Line
- Platforms: 2
- Tracks: 2

Construction
- Structure type: Aboveground

History
- Opened: December 21, 2010
- Former names: Seocheon; Gyeonggang

Services
Preceding station	Seoul Metropolitan Subway	Following station
Gapyeong towards Cheongnyangni or Kwangwoon University	Gyeongchun Line	Baegyang-ri towards Chuncheon
Location

Gulbongsan station (Korean: 굴봉산역; Hanja: 屈峰山驛) is a railway station on the Gyeongchun Line in Namsan-myeon, Chuncheon-si, Gangwon-do, South Korea. The station's subname is Jade Garden, referencing the nearby Jade Garden, located about 4 km away from the station. A free shuttle bus operates every hour to transport visitors.

Before the station's upgrade to a double-track system, Mugunghwa trains made several stops daily. However, following the completion of the double-track upgrade on December 21, 2010, the station was renamed Gulbongsan station, and Mugunghwa trains were replaced by commuter trains. Consequently, Mugunghwa trains no longer stop at the station.

== Naming ==
The original Seocheon station was located at 230 Seocheon-ri, Namsan-myeon, Chuncheon-gun. However, due to the existence of another station with the same name, Seocheon station in Seocheon, South Chungcheong Province, there was potential for confusion. To avoid this, and since the station is situated between Gyeonggi and Gangwon Provinces, it was renamed Gyeonggang station (Gyeonggi + Gangwon), symbolizing the meeting point of the two provinces.

In 2010, with the expansion of the Seoul Metropolitan Subway, the station was renamed to Gulbongsan station, referring to its proximity to the Bongsan caves, located 395 meters above sea level.

== Layout ==
L2; Platforms	Side platform, doors will open on the left
L2; Platforms	Eastbound	Gyeongchun Line towards Chuncheon (Baegyang-ri) →
L2; Platforms	Westbound	← Gyeongchun Line towards Cheongnyangni or Kwangwoon Univ. (Gapyeong)
L2; Platforms	Side platform, doors will open on the left

L1; Concourse	Lobby	Customer Service, Shops, Vending machines, ATMs

G	Street level	Exit
