= Sinnam station =

Sinnam station (Korean: 신남역; Hanja: 新南驛) is a railroad station in South Korea.

- Old name of Gimyujeong station
- Old name of Cheongnaeondeok station
