= Cheonmasan station =

Railway station in South Korea

천마산; Cheonmasan
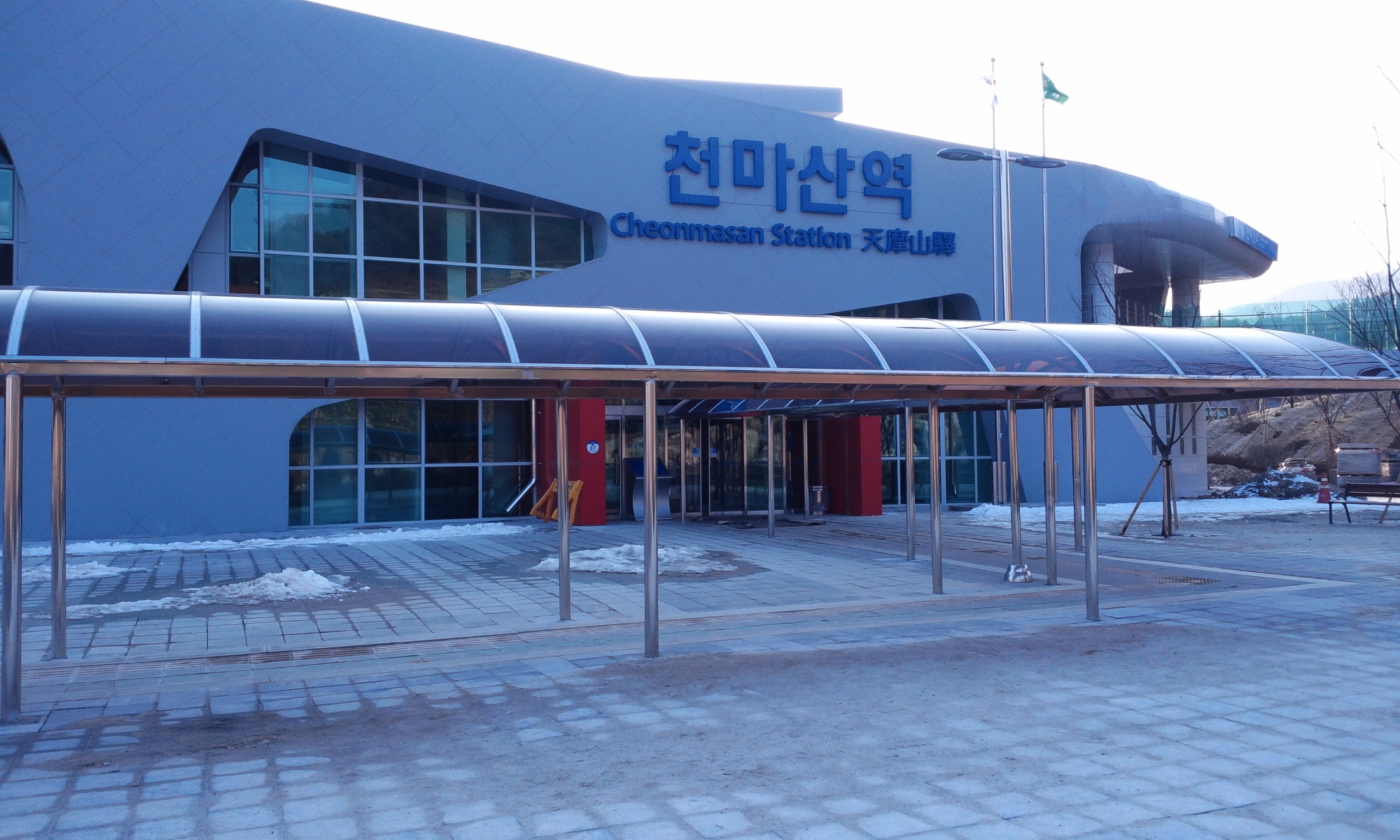

Korean name
- Hangul: 천마산역
- Hanja: 天摩山驛
- Revised Romanization: Cheonmasannyeok
- McCune–Reischauer: Ch'ŏnmasannyŏk

General information
- Location: Mukhyeon-ri, Hwado-eup, Namyangju, Gyeonggi
- Coordinates: 37.6578°N 127.287159°E
- Operator: Korail
- Line: Gyeongchun Line
- Platforms: 2
- Tracks: 2

Construction
- Structure type: Aboveground

History
- Opened: November 30, 2013; December 31, 2014 (Station building completion)

Services
Preceding station	Seoul Metropolitan Subway	Following station
PyeongnaeHopyeong towards Cheongnyangni or Kwangwoon University	Gyeongchun Line	Maseok towards Chuncheon
Location

Cheonmasan station (Korean: 천마산역) is a railway station of the Gyeongchun Line in Hwado-eup, Namyangju, Gyeonggi Province, South Korea. The station name comes from Cheonmasan.

Due to approval, the station confirmed, opening date set to June 29, 2013, but the opening was delayed by five months. The station was opened on November 30, 2013, despite the station building being under construction. It was completed on December 31, 2014.

== Station layout ==
L2; Platforms	Side platform, doors will open on the left
L2; Platforms	Eastbound	Gyeongchun Line toward Chuncheon (Maseok) →
L2; Platforms	Westbound	← Gyeongchun Line toward Cheongnyangni or Kwangwoon Univ. (PyeongnaeHopyeong)
L2; Platforms	Side platform, doors will open on the left

L1; Concourse	Lobby	Customer Service, Shops, Vending machines, ATMs

G	Street level	Exit

== Gallery ==
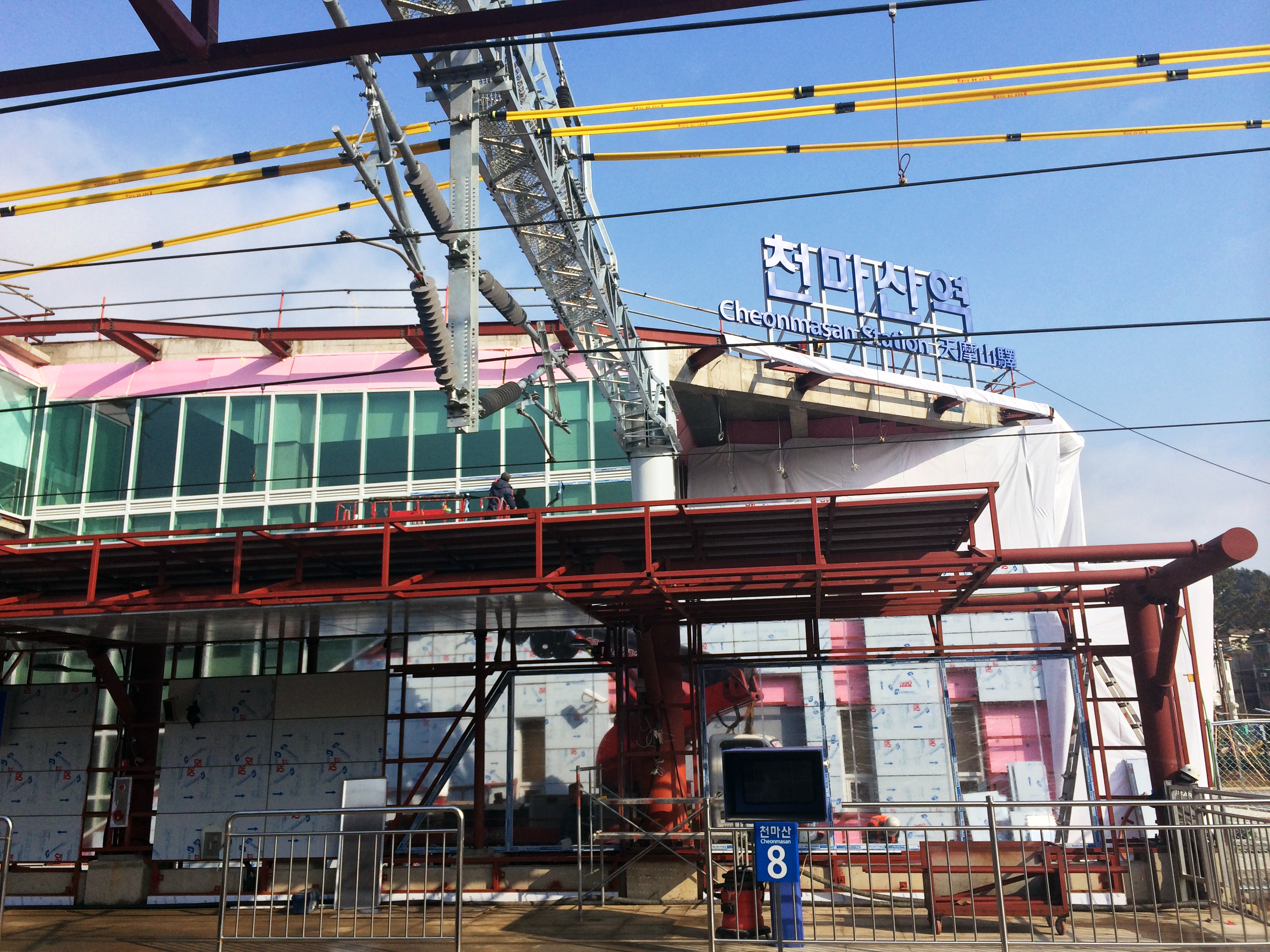
Cheonmasan station during construction

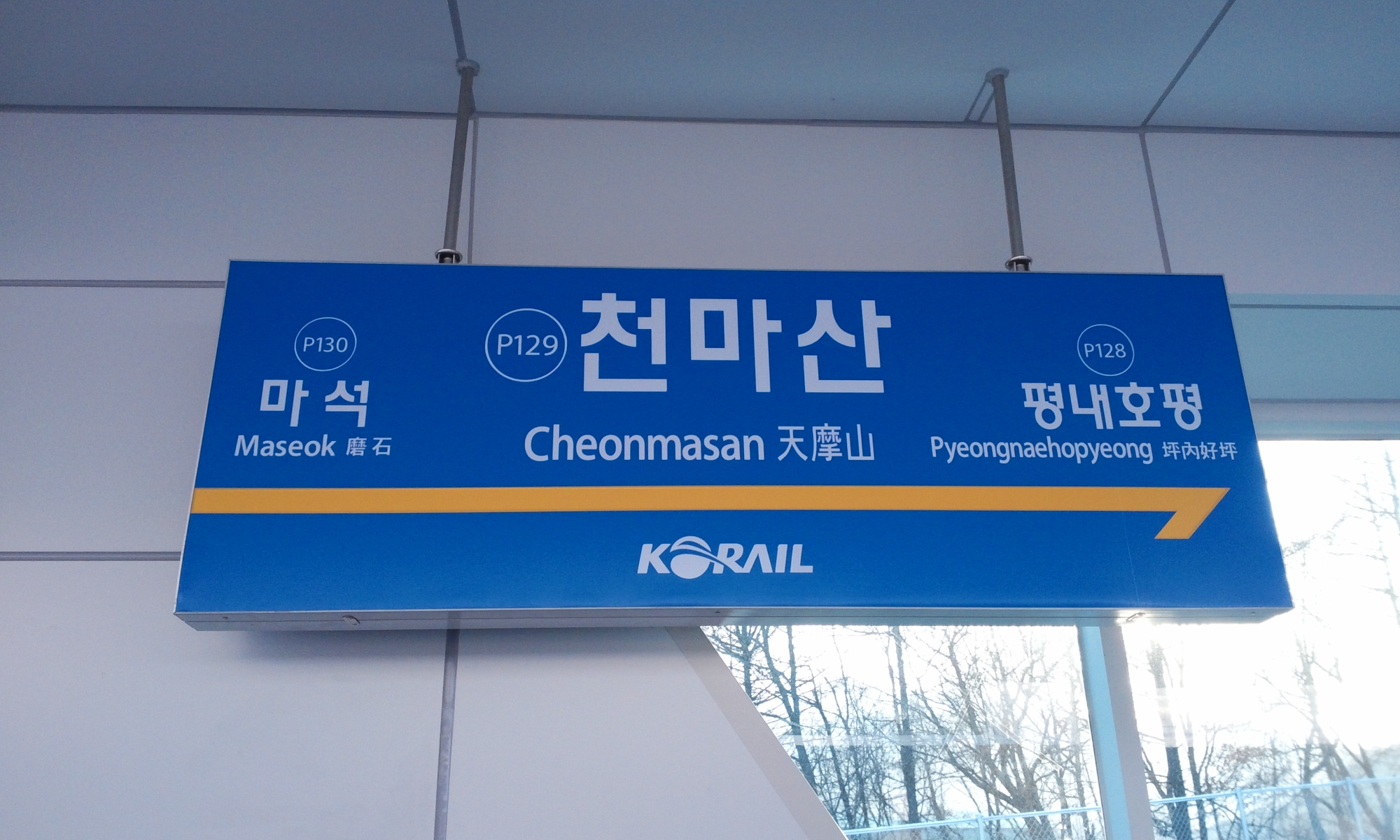
Station nameplate

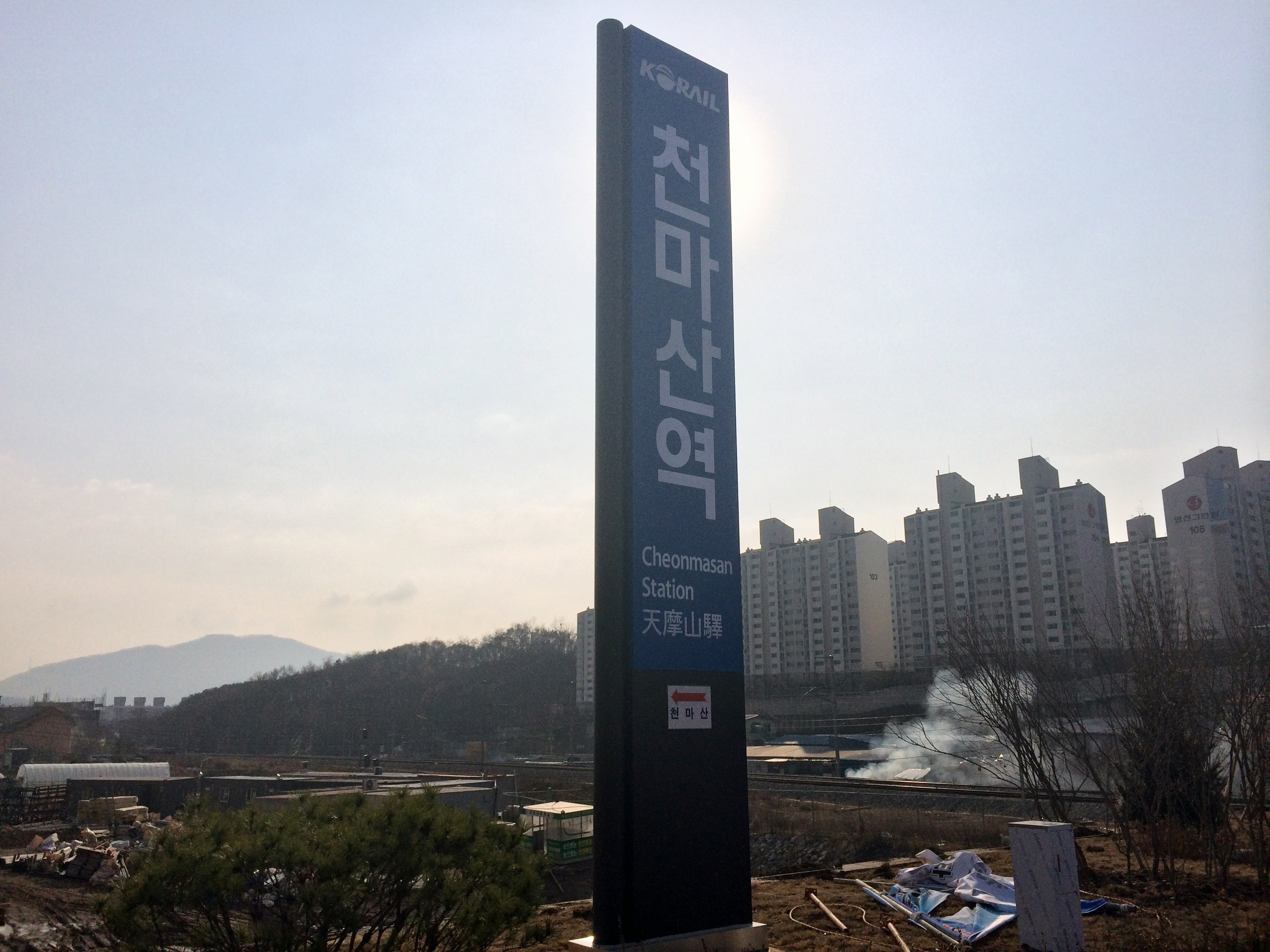
Station pole outside exit
