= Gim Yujeong =

Korean novelist

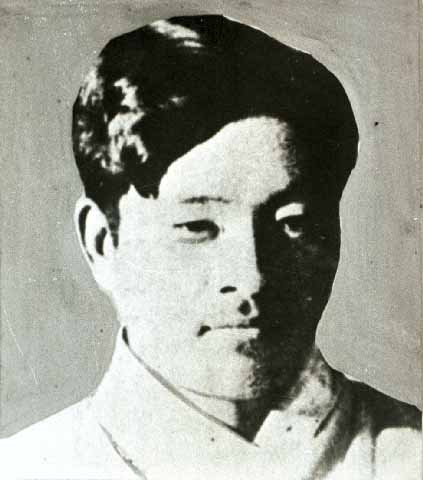
- Born: January 18, 1908; Chuncheon, Gangwon, Korean Empire
- Died: March 29, 1937 (aged 29); Keijō, Keiki-dō, Korea, Empire of Japan
- Education: Yonsei University; Korea University
- Occupations: Novelist, Poet, Teacher
- Relatives: Kim Chun-sik (father), Mrs. Sim of Cheongsong (mother), Kim Ik-chan (grandfather), Kim Yu-geun (older brother), Kim Yu-yeong (second older sister), Kim Yu-gyeong (third older sister), and four older sisters, Kim Yeong-su (nephew)
- Writing career
- Language: Korean
- Period: 1932 ~ 1937
- Genres: Novel, Poetry, Essay
- Website: www.kimyoujeong.org

- Gim Yujeong
- Hangul: 김유정
- Hanja: 金裕貞
- RR: Gim Yujeong
- MR: Kim Yujŏng

Gim Yujeong or Kim Yu-jŏng (Korean: 김유정, 11 January 1908 – 29 March 1937) was a Korean novelist. He is one of the famous novelists of Korea, also recognized as the icon of Chuncheon, where he was born. Gim You-jeong Literature Village and Gimyujeong Station, both located in Chuncheon, are named after him.

== Life ==
Gim was born in Chuncheon, Gangwon Province on January 11, 1908. He was the son of a wealthy landowner. The family fortunes, however, were squandered away by his older brother, and Gim spent much of his adolescent and adult life in poverty. After graduating Whimoon High School, Gim attended Yonhi College, now Yonsei University, in Seoul. He made his literary debut with the publication of "Wanderer Among the Hills” (Sangol nageune) in 1933 and won short fiction contests held by Chosun Ilbo and Chosun Joongang Ilbo two years later. In 1935, he became a member of the literary coterie, the League of Nine (Guinhoe), which included such prominent poets and fiction writers as Jeong Ji-yong and Yi Sang.

He wrote a total of approximately thirty stories, most of them having been published in 1935 and 1936.

Gim Yujeong died of pulmonary tuberculosis on March 29, 1937.

== Work ==
Gim's work has been described as "rich and earthy". He wrote approximately 30 short stories, most of which were published in the three years before his death. His 1936 story "The Camellias" (동백꽃, dongbaekkkot) is about the residents of a Korean farming village; its implicit sexuality was more explicit in his 1935 "Rain Shower" (소낙비, sonagbi, also translated Downpour). His 1937 story "The Scorching Heat" was considered gloomy.

The prototypical Gim Yujeong protagonist might be the narrator of “Spring, Spring” (봄봄, bom bom, 1935), a simpleton who is slow to realize that his wily future father-in-law is exploiting his labor, or the husband in “Scorching Sun” (땡볕, ttaengbyeot), too ignorant to know that his wife's illness is actually due to an overgrown baby in her womb. Bawdy dialogue and colloquial slang heighten the comic potential of such situations, but an undercurrent of sadness suggests the wretchedness of poverty-stricken lives. Embedded within Gim Yujeong's lyrical approach to nature and robust characterization of peasant wholesomeness are indirect references to questions of class. Conflicts between tenants and middlemen, as well as the problem of absentee landlordism which rose sharply as a result of Japanese agricultural policy hint at the dark and bleak reality of rural Korea in the 1930s.

Gim engages the structural contradictions of rural Korean society at a more explicit level in “Rain Shower” and “Scoundrels” (만무방, manmubang). Both the husband in “Rain Shower” and the older brother in “Scoundrels” are dislocated farmers who must drift about after losing their tenancy. In an atmosphere of overwhelming hopelessness and despair, where back-breaking work only leads peasants deeper and deeper into debt, both characters turn to gambling in search of making a quick profit. The husband in “A Rainy Spell” encourages his wife's sexual union with a wealthy old man for money, and the older brother in “Scoundrels” parts with his wife and child altogether to find means of survival. The speculative spirit which extreme poverty fosters among peasants also manifests itself as gold fever in “Bonanza” (노다지, nodaji, 1935) and “Plucking Gold in a Field of Beans” (금 따는 콩밭, geum ttaneun kongbat). Though most of his stories are sketches of rural communities in decline, Gim also turned his attention to the plight of the urban poor in such stories as “Wretched Lives” (따라지, ttaraji).

== The World of Works ==
Kim Yoo-jeong's novel is interesting it perceives warm love for humans artistically and interestingly. The love that can hold many people in one string and connects their hearts to each other is interestingly illustrated by the skill of traditional folk art. However, his works do not hang on to popular interest or low-level comedy because literature of a folk character is rooted in the love of the people. Kim Yoo-jeong's novels are characterized by humor and sorrow, so to speak, that the stupidity or ignorance of the characters often induces laughter, which leads to their own poor and miserable real life and instills deep sorrow.

== Works in Translation ==
- Camellias (1936)
- The Golden Bean Patch (available free from LTI Korea)

== Works in Korean (Partial) ==
- "Wanderer Among the Hills” (Sangol nageune, 1933)
- “Spring, Spring” (1935)
- “Scorching Sun” (Ttaengbyeot)
- “A Rainy Spell” (Sonakbi)
- “Scoundrels” (Manmubang)
- “Bonanza” (Nodaji, 1935)
- “Plucking Gold in a Field of Beans” (Geum ttaneun kongbat)
- “Wretched Lives” (Ttaraji)
- “Camellia Flower”(Dongbaek Kkot, 1936)

== Gim You-jeong Literature Village ==
On August 6, 2002, the Gim Yu-jeong House of Literature (also known as the Literary Village of Kim You Jeong) was founded - an exhibition hall and tourist attraction which aims to honor the spirit and literature of the village. The Gim Yu-jeong Memorial Society holds events such as the Gim Yu-jeong Memorial Ceremony, research meetings, a literary festival for youths, and more.

The opening hours of the House are between 9:30 to 17:00 in the winter and 9:00 - 18:00 in the summer. Guided commentary is available upon request, but the application form for it must be submitted with at least a week's notice.

== See also ==
- Gimyujeong Station
- 저자:김유정 (in Korean) – via Wikisource.
