= Gapyeong station =

Train station in South Korea

가평
Gapyeong
가평; Gapyeong
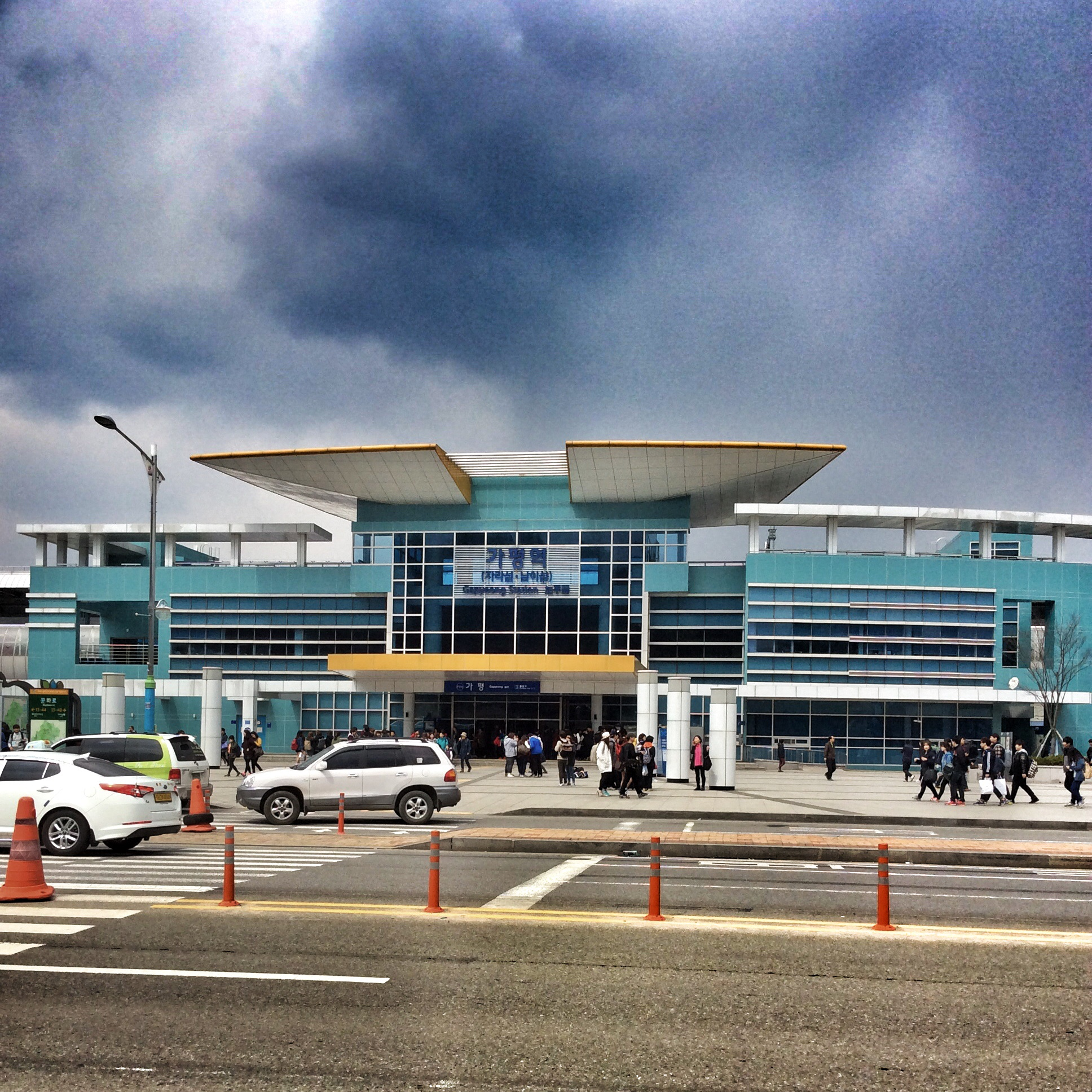

Korean name
- Hangul: 가평역
- Hanja: 加平驛
- Revised Romanization: Gapyeongnyeok
- McCune–Reischauer: Kap'yŏngnyŏk

General information
- Location: 603-2 Daljeon-ri, 13-42; Munhwaro, Gapyeong-eup, Gapyeong-gun, Gyeonggi-do
- Coordinates: 37.82423°N 127.51310°E
- Operator: Korail
- Line: Gyeongchun Line
- Platforms: 2
- Tracks: 4

Construction
- Structure type: Aboveground

History
- Opened: December 21, 2010

Services
Preceding station	Seoul Metropolitan Subway	Following station
Sangcheon towards Cheongnyangni or Kwangwoon University	Gyeongchun Line	Gulbongsan towards Chuncheon
Cheongpyeong towards Cheongnyangni	Gyeongchun Line Express	Gangchon towards Chuncheon
Preceding station	Korail	Following station
Cheongpyeong towards Yongsan	ITX-Cheongchun	Gangchon towards Chuncheon
Location

Gapyeong Station (Korean: 가평역; Hanja: 加平驛) is a railway station of the Gyeongchun Line in Gapyeong-eup, Gapyeong-gun, Gyeonggi-do, South Korea. It is also served by the ITX-Cheongchun between Chuncheon and Yongsan.

== Station Layout ==
G	Entrances and Exits
L1; Concourse	Lobby	Customer Service, Shops, Vending machines, ATMs
L2; Platform level	Eastbound	Gyeongchun Line Local toward Chuncheon (Gulbongsan) →
L2; Platform level	Island platform, doors open on the left
L2; Platform level	Eastbound	Gyeongchun Line Express toward Chuncheon (Gangchon) → ITX-Cheongchun toward Chuncheon (Gangchon) →
L2; Platform level	Westbound	← ITX-Cheongchun toward Yongsan (Cheongpyeong) ← Gyeongchun Line Express toward Cheongnyangni (Cheongpyeong)
L2; Platform level	Island platform, doors open on the left
L2; Platform level	Westbound	← Gyeongchun Line Local toward Cheongnyangni or Kwangwoon Univ. (Sangcheon)

== Gallery ==
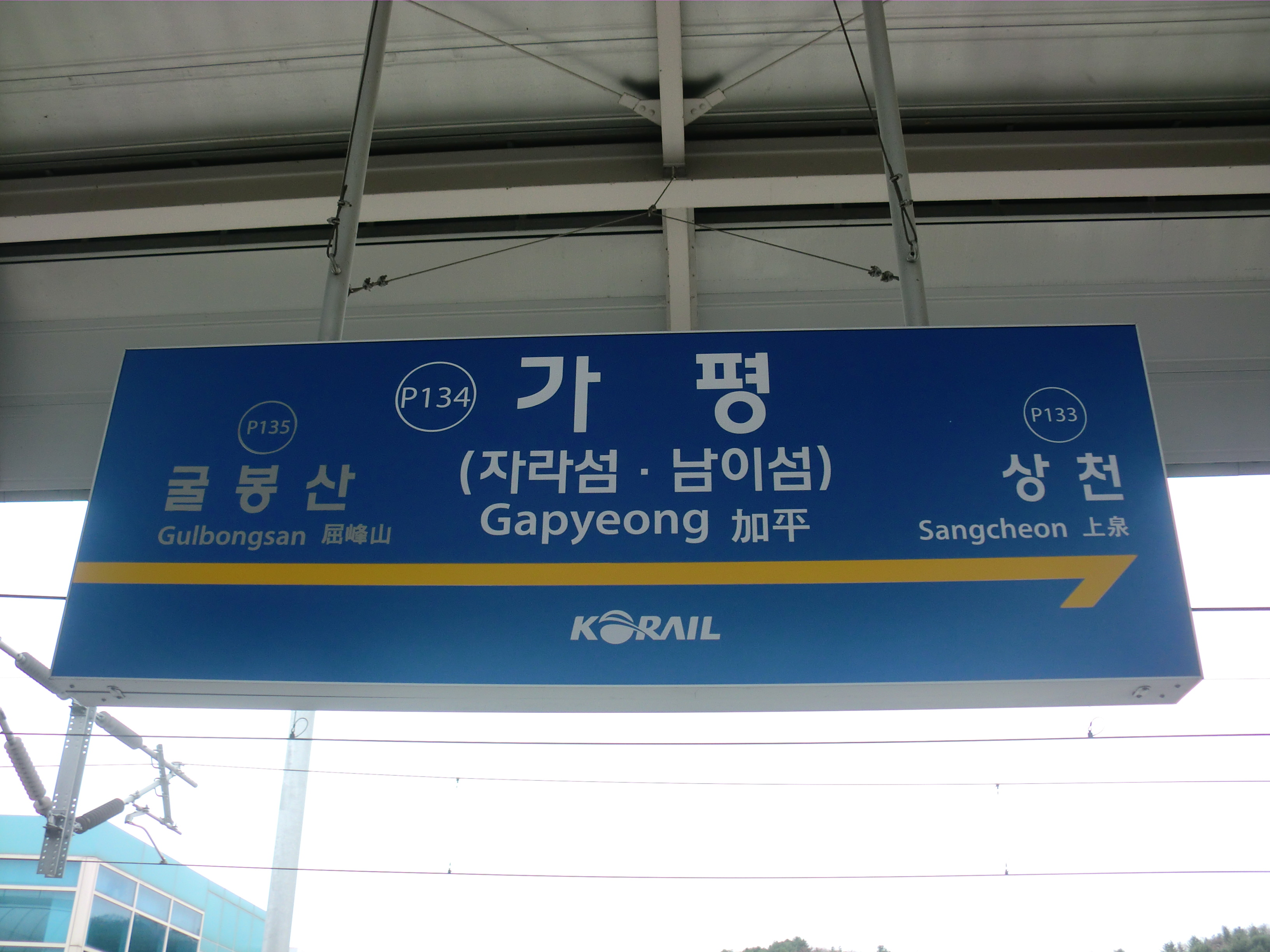
Station Sign

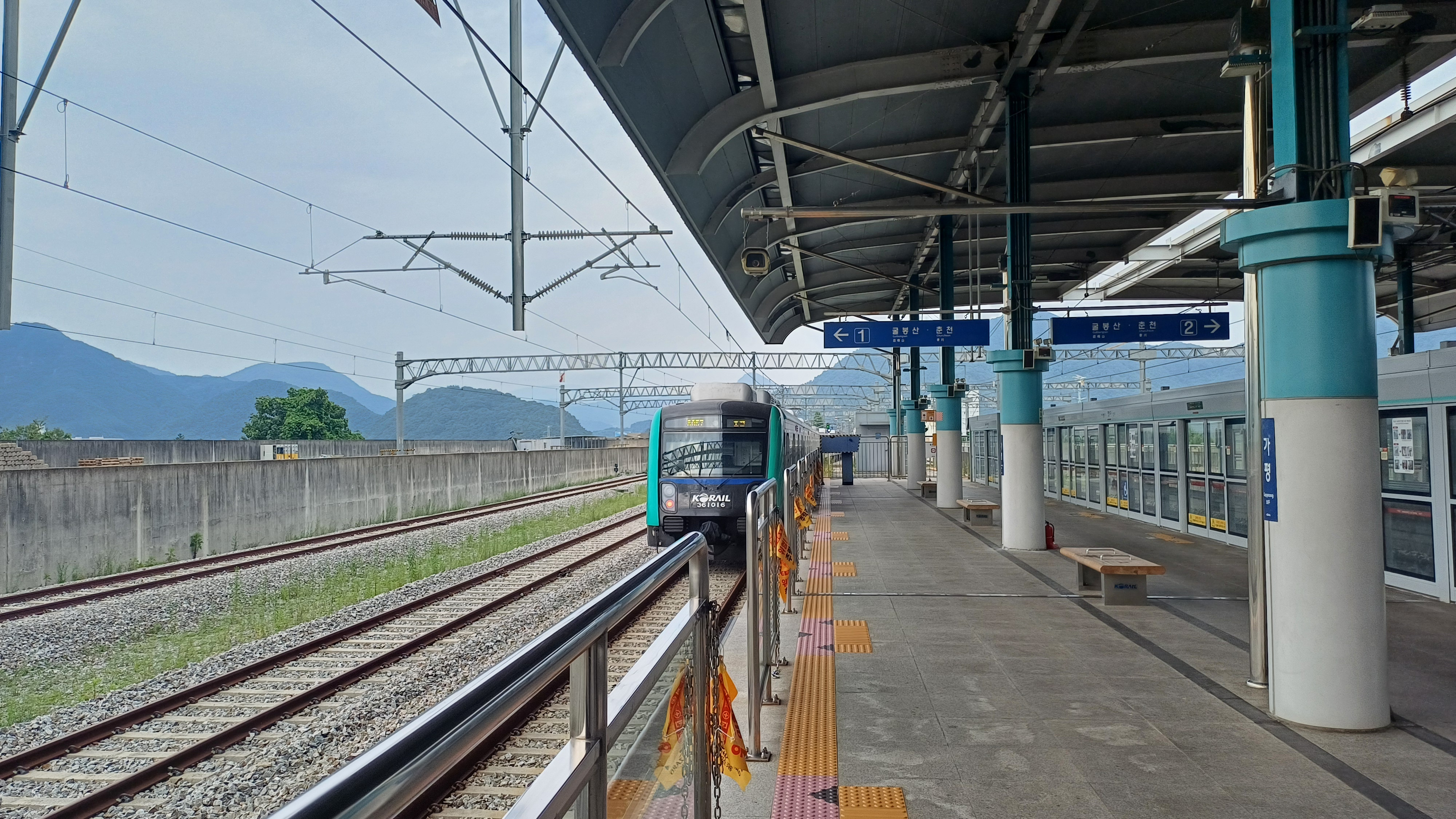
Platform, with a train arriving
