= Cheongpyeong station =

Train station in South Korea

청평
Cheongpyeong
청평; Cheongpyeong
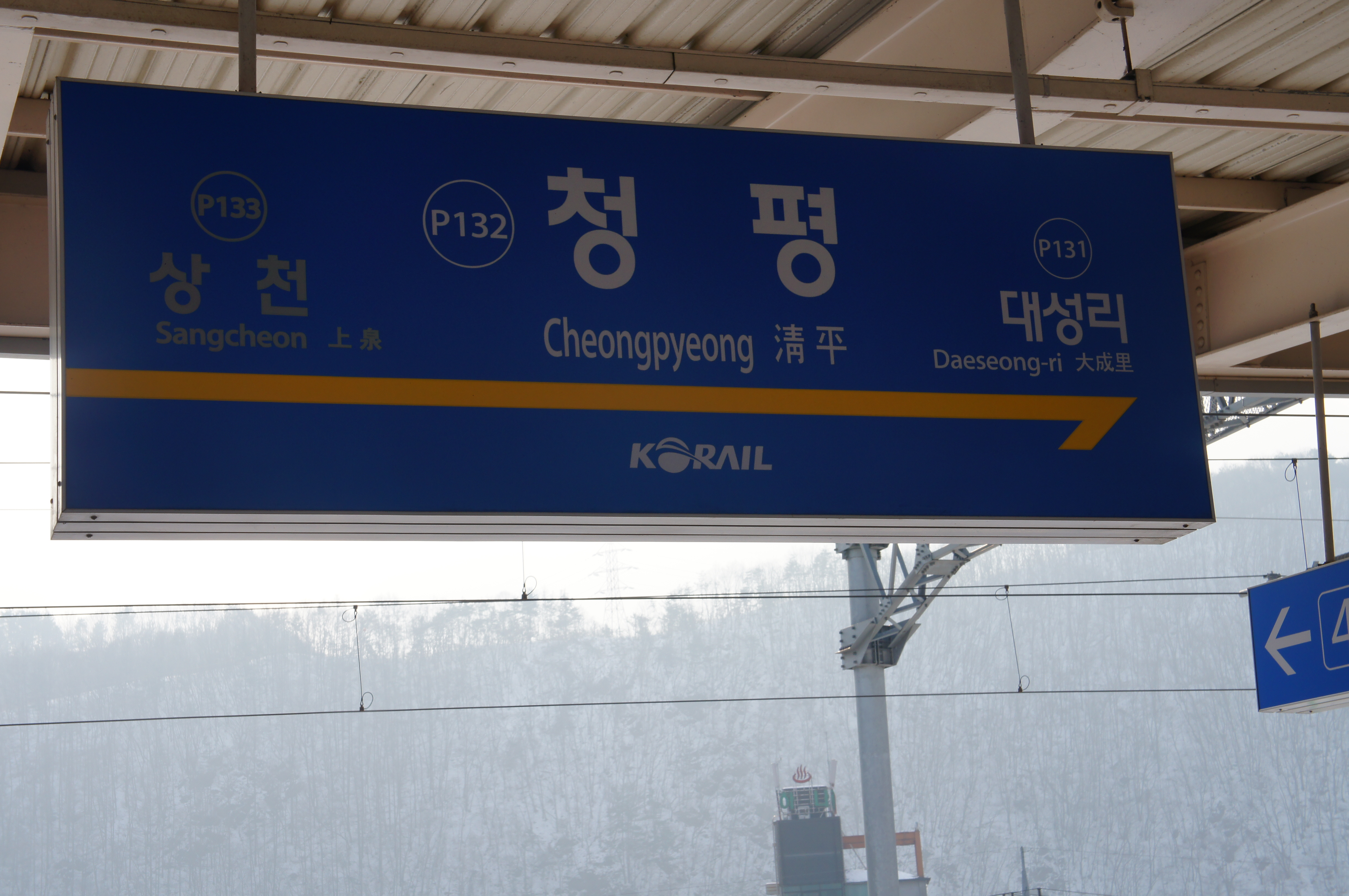

Korean name
- Hangul: 청평역
- Hanja: 淸平驛
- RR: Cheongpyeong-yeok
- MR: Ch'ŏngp'yŏng-yŏk

General information
- Location: 175 Cheongpyeongni, 38-163 Jamgokjageunno, Cheongpyeong-myeon, Gapyeong-gun, Gyeonggi-do
- Coordinates: 37°44′07″N 127°25′35″E
- Operator: Korail
- Line: Gyeongchun Line
- Platforms: 2
- Tracks: 4

Construction
- Structure type: Aboveground

History
- Opened: December 21, 2010

Services
Preceding station	Seoul Metropolitan Subway	Following station
Daeseong-ri towards Cheongnyangni or Kwangwoon University	Gyeongchun Line	Sangcheon towards Chuncheon
Maseok towards Cheongnyangni	Gyeongchun Line Express	Gapyeong towards Chuncheon
Preceding station	Korail	Following station
Maseok towards Yongsan	ITX-Cheongchun	Gapyeong towards Chuncheon
Location

Cheongpyeong station (Korean: 청평역) is a railway station on the Gyeongchun Line, a regional rail line operated by Korail between Seoul and Chuncheon in South Korea.

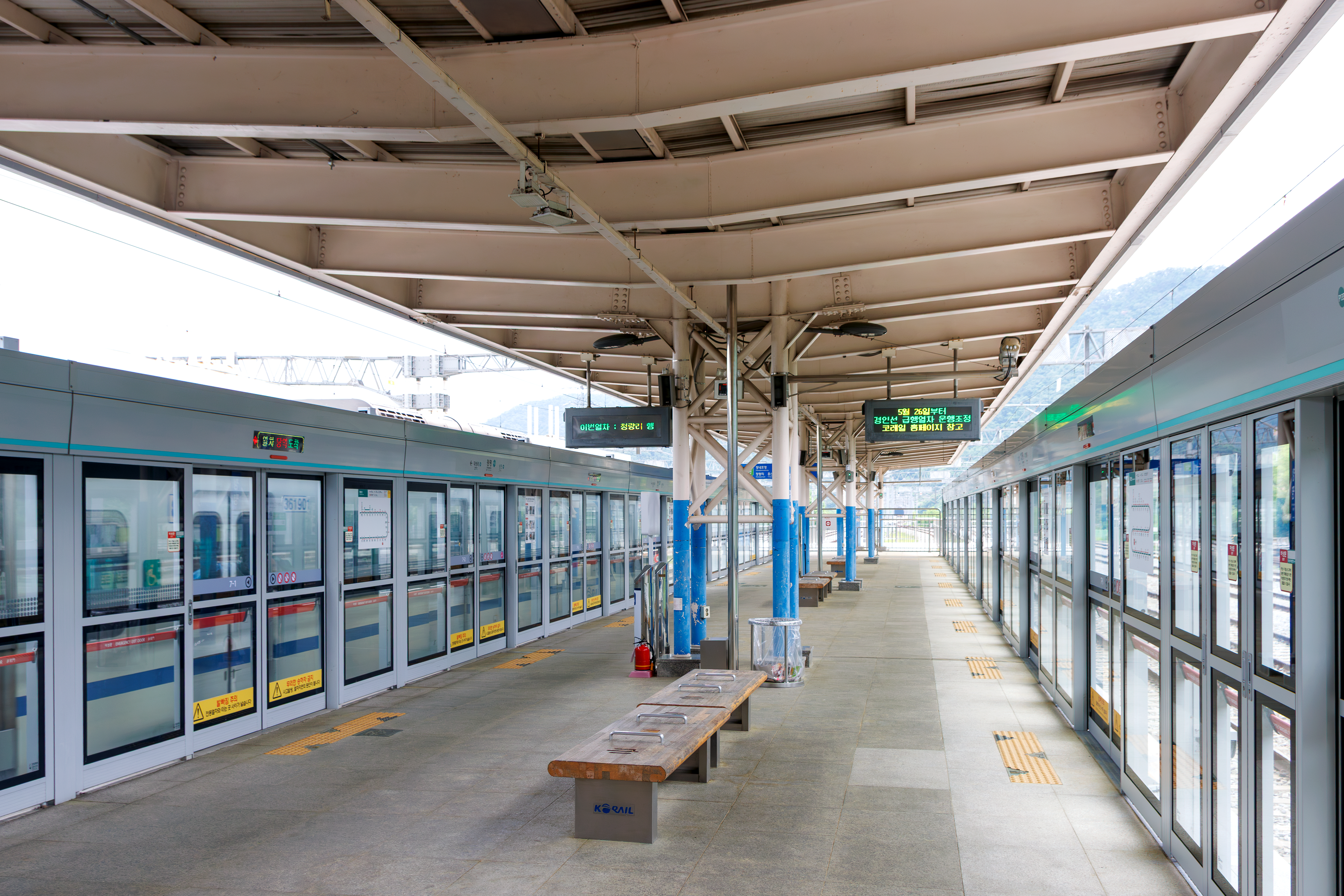
Platform
