= Gangchon station =

Train station in South Korea

강촌 (송곡대학교)
Gangchon
(Songgok Univ.)
강촌 (송곡대학교); Gangchon (Songgok Univ.)
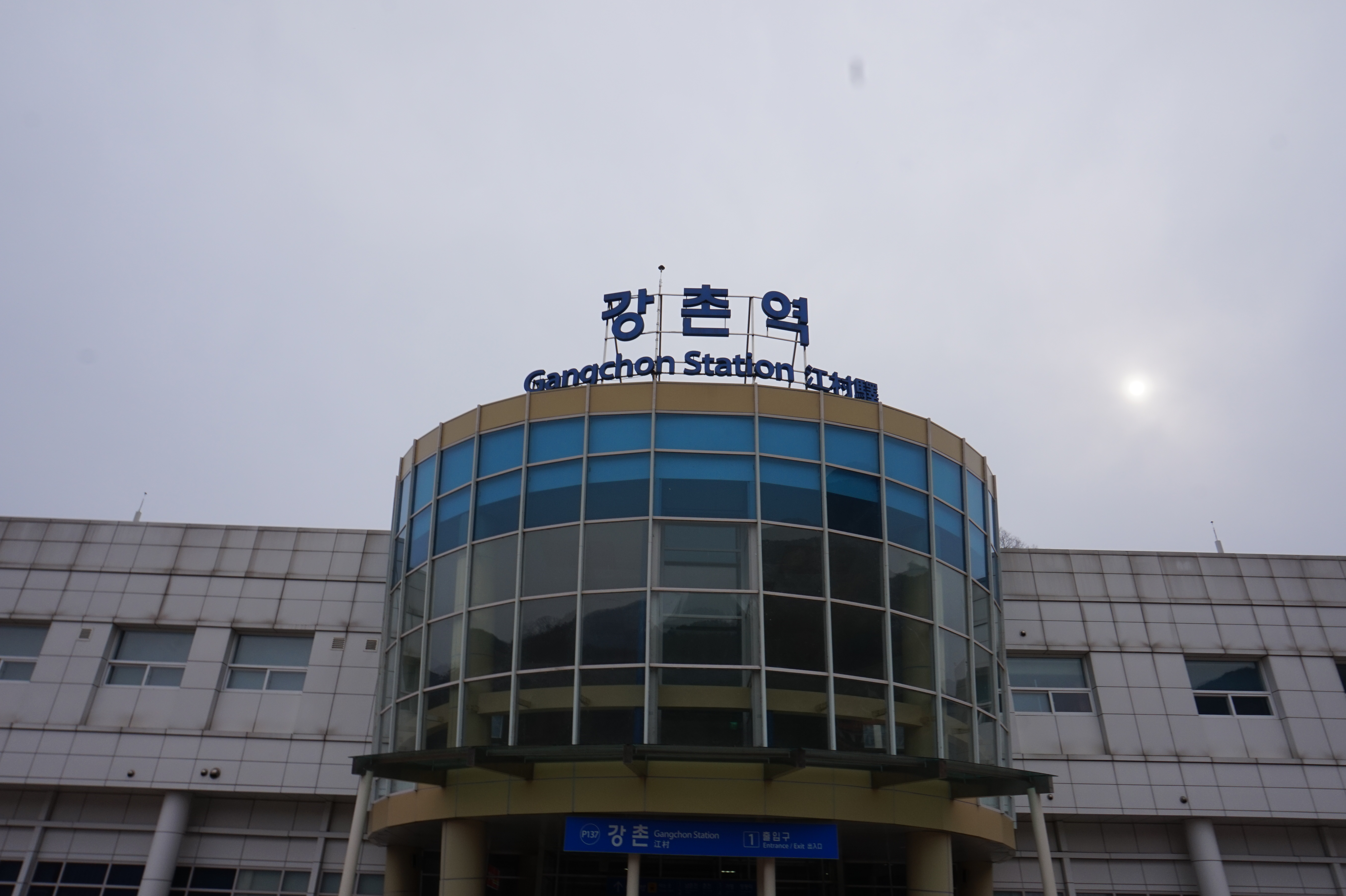

Korean name
- Hangul: 강촌역
- Hanja: 江村驛
- Revised Romanization: Gangchonyeok
- McCune–Reischauer: Kangch'onyŏk

General information
- Location: 88-2 Gangchonni, 1051 Sojugogaero, Namsan-myeon, Chuncheon-si, Gangwon-do
- Coordinates: 37.81647°N 127.63171°E
- Operator: Korail
- Line: Gyeongchun Line
- Platforms: 2
- Tracks: 4

Construction
- Structure type: Aboveground

Key dates
- December 21, 2010: Gyeongchun Line opened
Location

Gangchon station is a railway station on the Gyeongchun Line.

Preceding station	Seoul Metropolitan Subway	Following station
Baegyang-ri towards Cheongnyangni or Kwangwoon University	Gyeongchun Line	Gimyujeong towards Chuncheon
Gapyeong towards Cheongnyangni	Gyeongchun Line Express	Namchuncheon towards Chuncheon
Preceding station	Korail	Following station
Gapyeong towards Yongsan	ITX-Cheongchun	Namchuncheon towards Chuncheon
