= Daeseong-ri station =

Train station in South Korea

대성리; Daeseong-ri
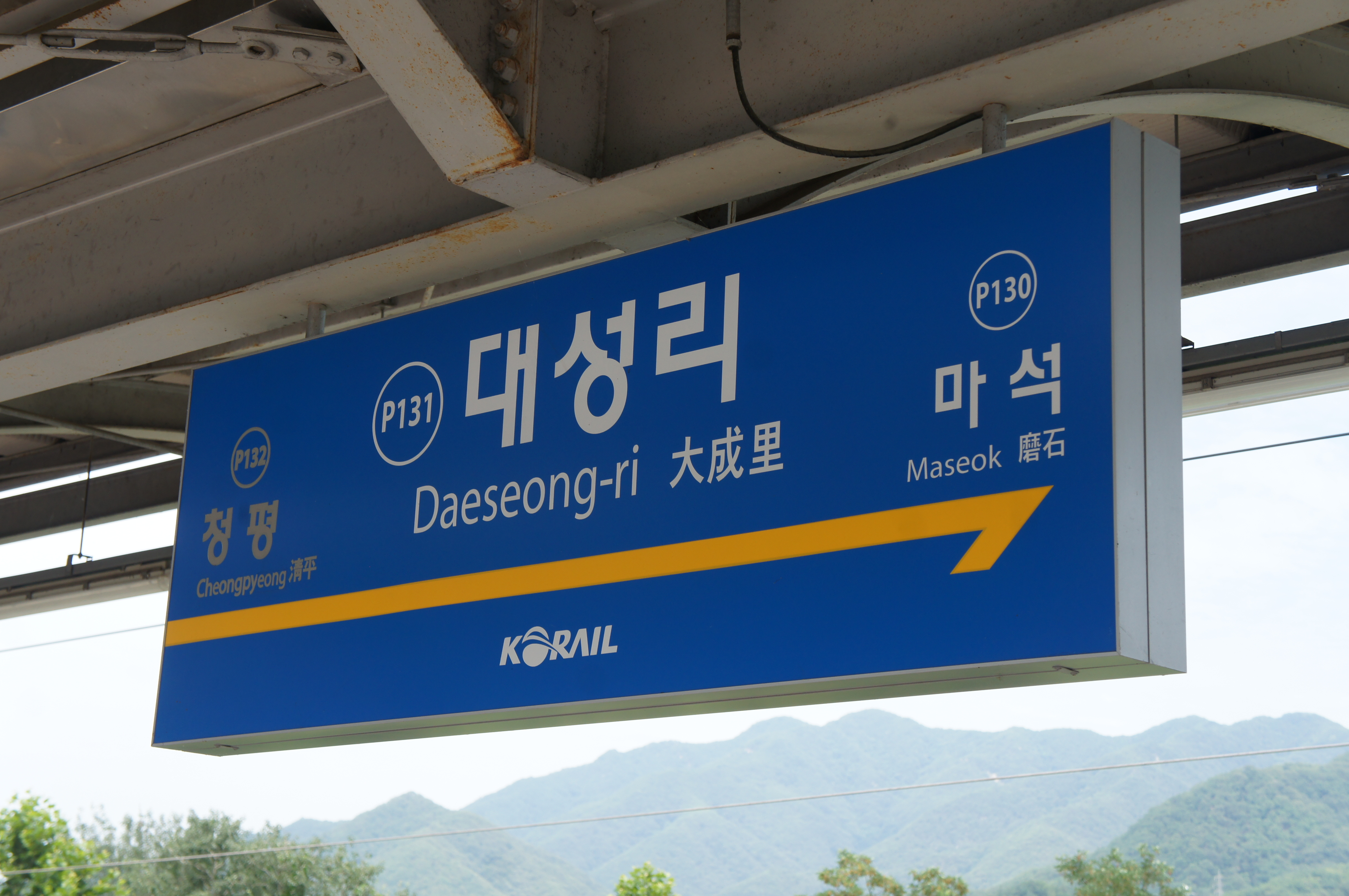

Korean name
- Hangul: 대성리역
- Hanja: 大成里驛
- Revised Romanization: Daeseongniyeok
- McCune–Reischauer: Taesŏngniyŏk

General information
- Location: 393-3 Daeseongni, 88 Gyeong- chunno, Cheongpyeong-myeon, Gapyeong-gun, Gyeonggi-do
- Coordinates: 37.68438°N 127.37937°E
- Operator: Korail
- Line: Gyeongchun Line
- Platforms: 2
- Tracks: 4

Construction
- Structure type: Aboveground

History
- Opened: December 21, 2010

Services
Preceding station	Seoul Metropolitan Subway	Following station
Maseok towards Cheongnyangni or Kwangwoon University	Gyeongchun Line	Cheongpyeong towards Chuncheon
Location

Daeseong-ri Station is a railway station on the Gyeongchun Line.

As the station was being rebuilt in preparation for the Gyeongchun Line double-tracking, it was first moved to a temporary station on January 20, 2009, and opened for business at the new station on September 1, 2010. The old station was constructed in 1957 and demolished on February 10, 2009.

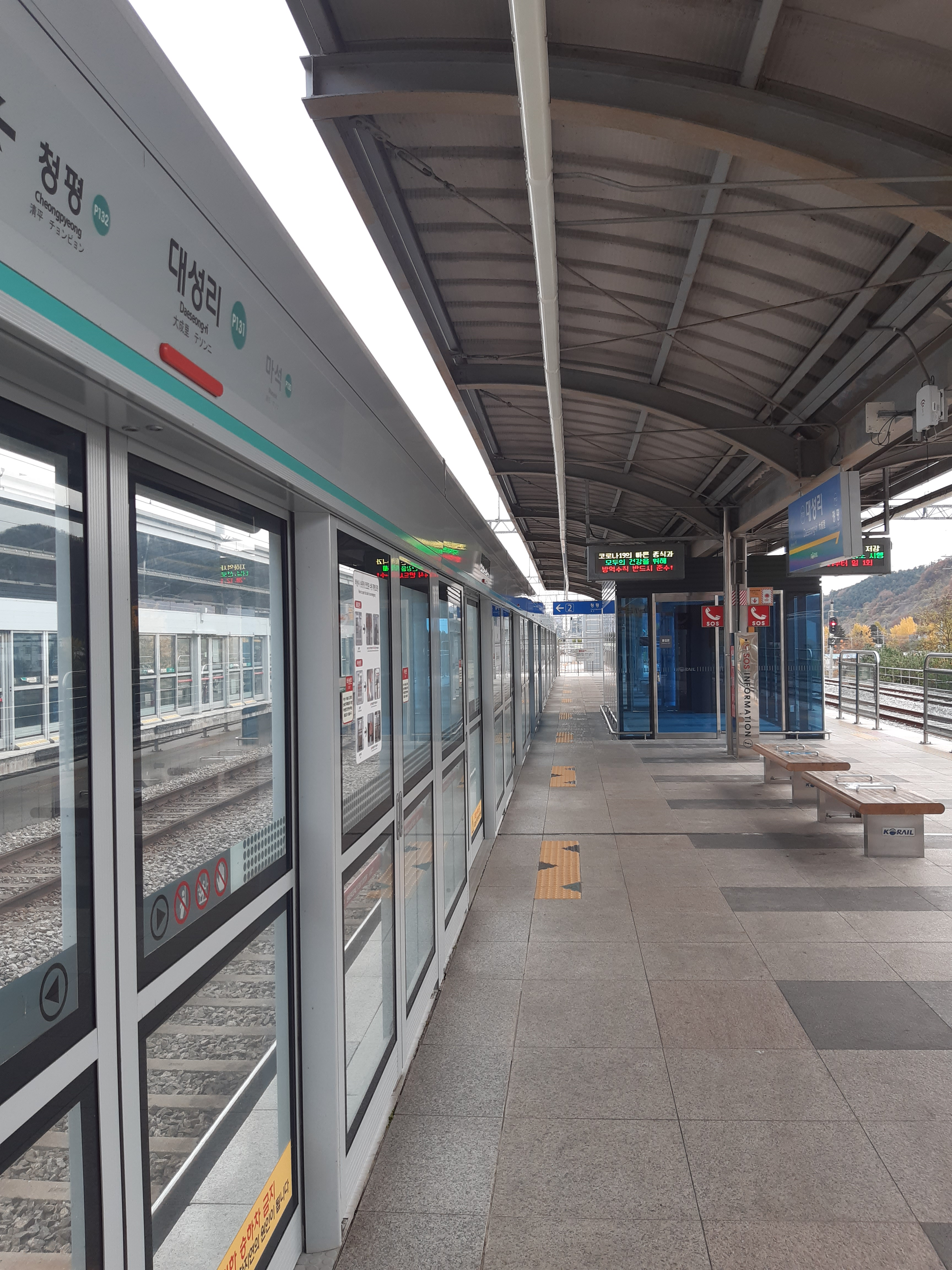
Platform
