= Sangcheon station =

Train station in South Korea

| 상천; Sangcheon |
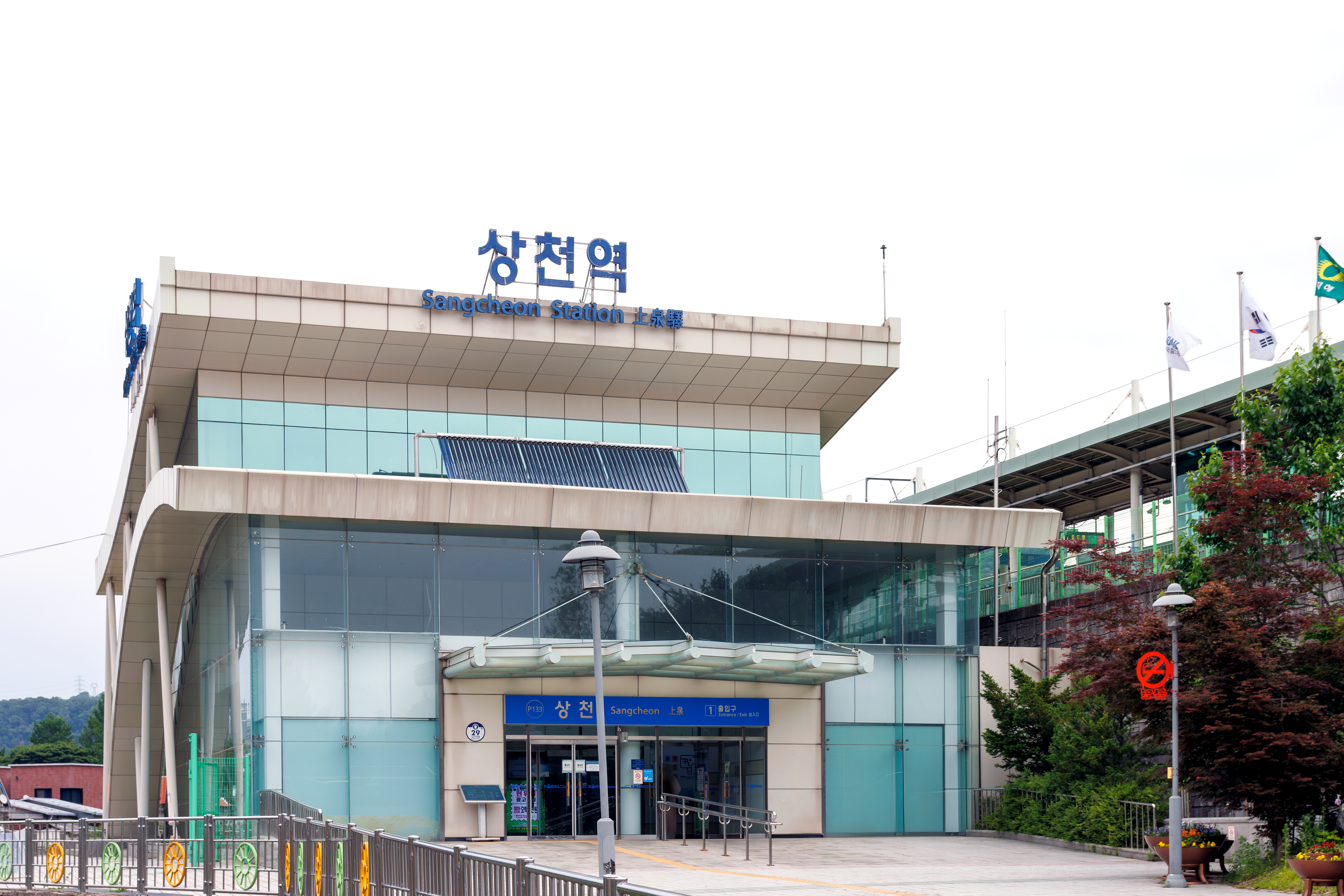

Korean name
- Hangul: 상천역
- Hanja: 上泉驛
- Revised Romanization: Sangcheonnyeok
- McCune–Reischauer: Sangch'ŏnnyŏk

General information
- Location: 1261 Sangcheonni, 29 Sangcheonyeongno, Cheongpyeong-myeon, Gapyeong-gun, Gyeonggi-do
- Coordinates: 37°46′11″N 127°27′14″E
- Operator: Korail
- Line: Gyeongchun Line
- Platforms: 2
- Tracks: 2

Construction
- Structure type: Aboveground

History
- Opened: December 21, 2010

Services
| Preceding station | Seoul Metropolitan Subway | Following station |
|---|---|---|
| Cheongpyeong towards Cheongnyangni or Kwangwoon University | Gyeongchun Line | Gapyeong towards Chuncheon |
Location

Sangcheon Station is a railway station on the Gyeongchun Line in Gapyeong, Gyeonggi Province, South Korea. Its station subname is Homyeong Lake, where Homyeong Lake is located nearby.

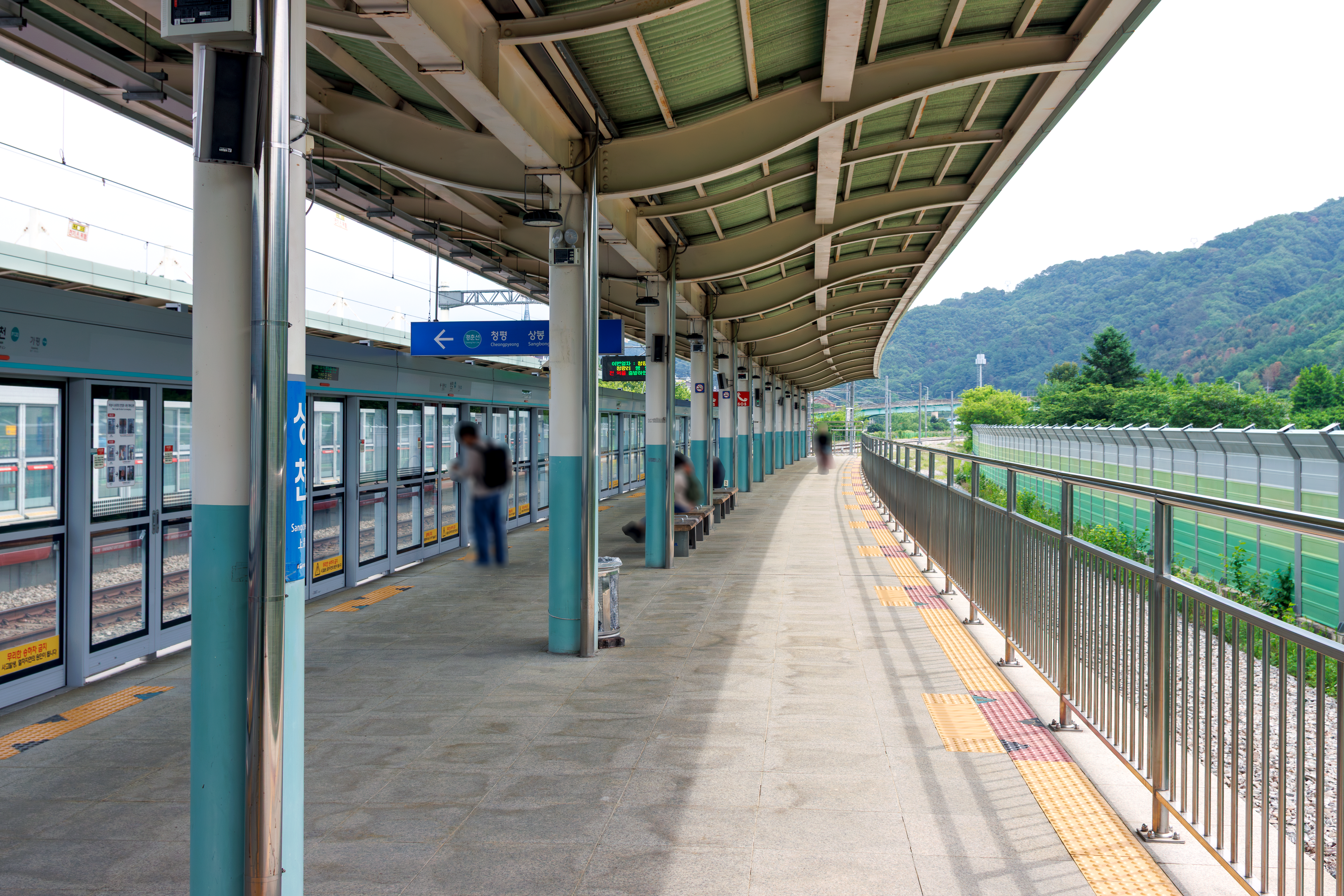
Platform
