= Maseok station =

Train station in South Korea

마석
Maseok
마석; Maseok
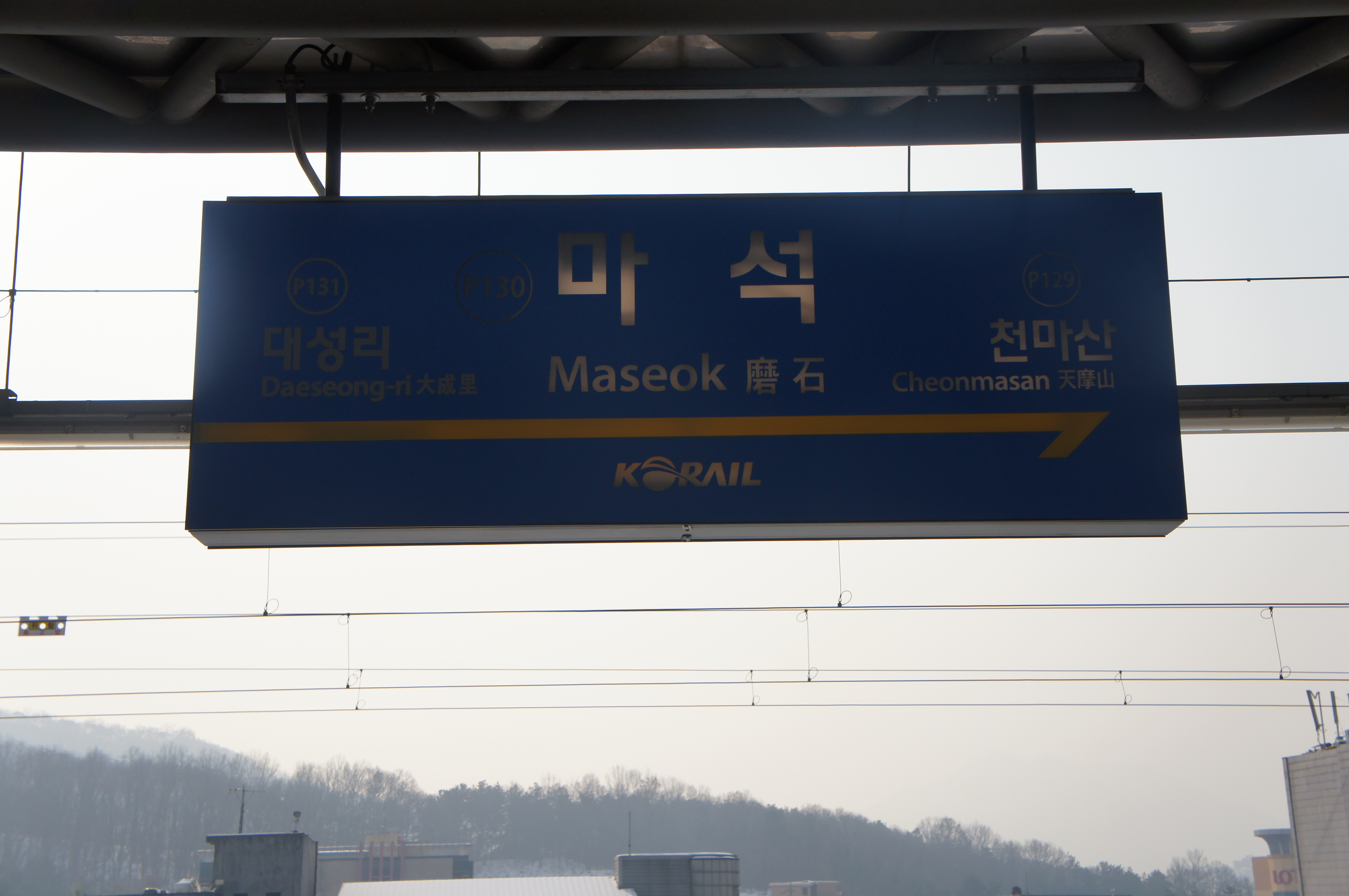

Korean name
- Hangul: 마석역
- Hanja: 磨石驛
- Revised Romanization: Maseongnyeok
- McCune–Reischauer: Masŏngnyŏk

General information
- Location: 291-3 Maseoguri, 83-14 Maseokjungangno, Hwado-eup, Namyangju-si, Gyeonggi-do
- Coordinates: 37°39′08″N 127°18′44″E
- Operator: Korail
- Line: Gyeongchun Line
- Platforms: 2
- Tracks: 4

Construction
- Structure type: Aboveground

History
- Opened: December 21, 2010

Services
Preceding station	Seoul Metropolitan Subway	Following station
Cheonmasan towards Cheongnyangni or Kwangwoon University	Gyeongchun Line	Daeseong-ri towards Chuncheon
PyeongnaeHopyeong towards Cheongnyangni	Gyeongchun Line Express	Cheongpyeong towards Chuncheon
Preceding station	Korail	Following station
PyeongnaeHopyeong towards Yongsan	ITX-Cheongchun	Cheongpyeong towards Chuncheon
Location

Maseok Station is a railway station on the Gyeongchun Line in South Korea.

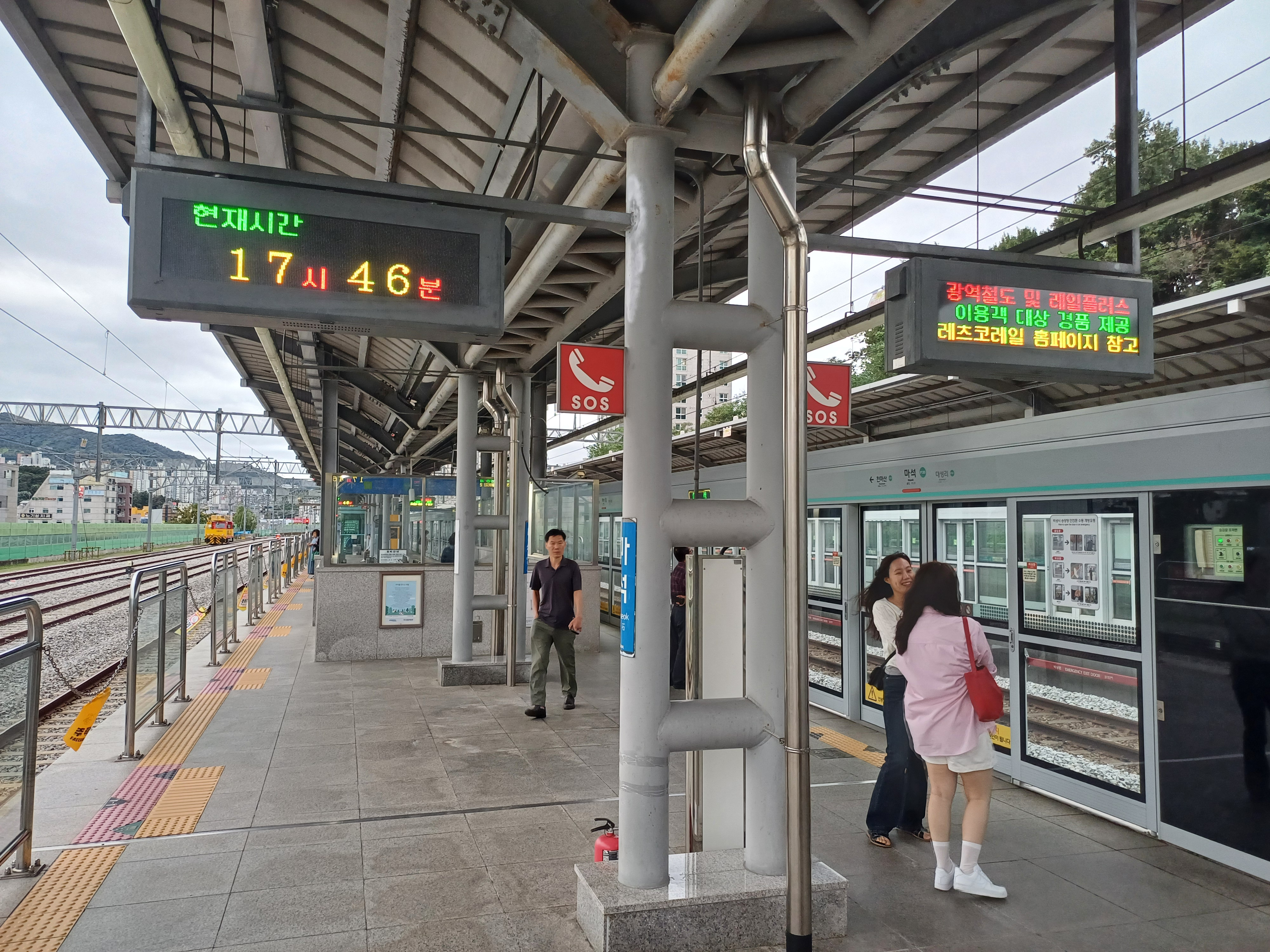
Platform
