= Namchuncheon station =

Train station in South Korea

Coordinates: 37.86100°N 127.72926°E

남춘천 (강원대)
Namchuncheon
(Kangwon Nat'l Univ.)
남춘천 (강원대); Namchuncheon (Kangwon Nat'l Univ.)
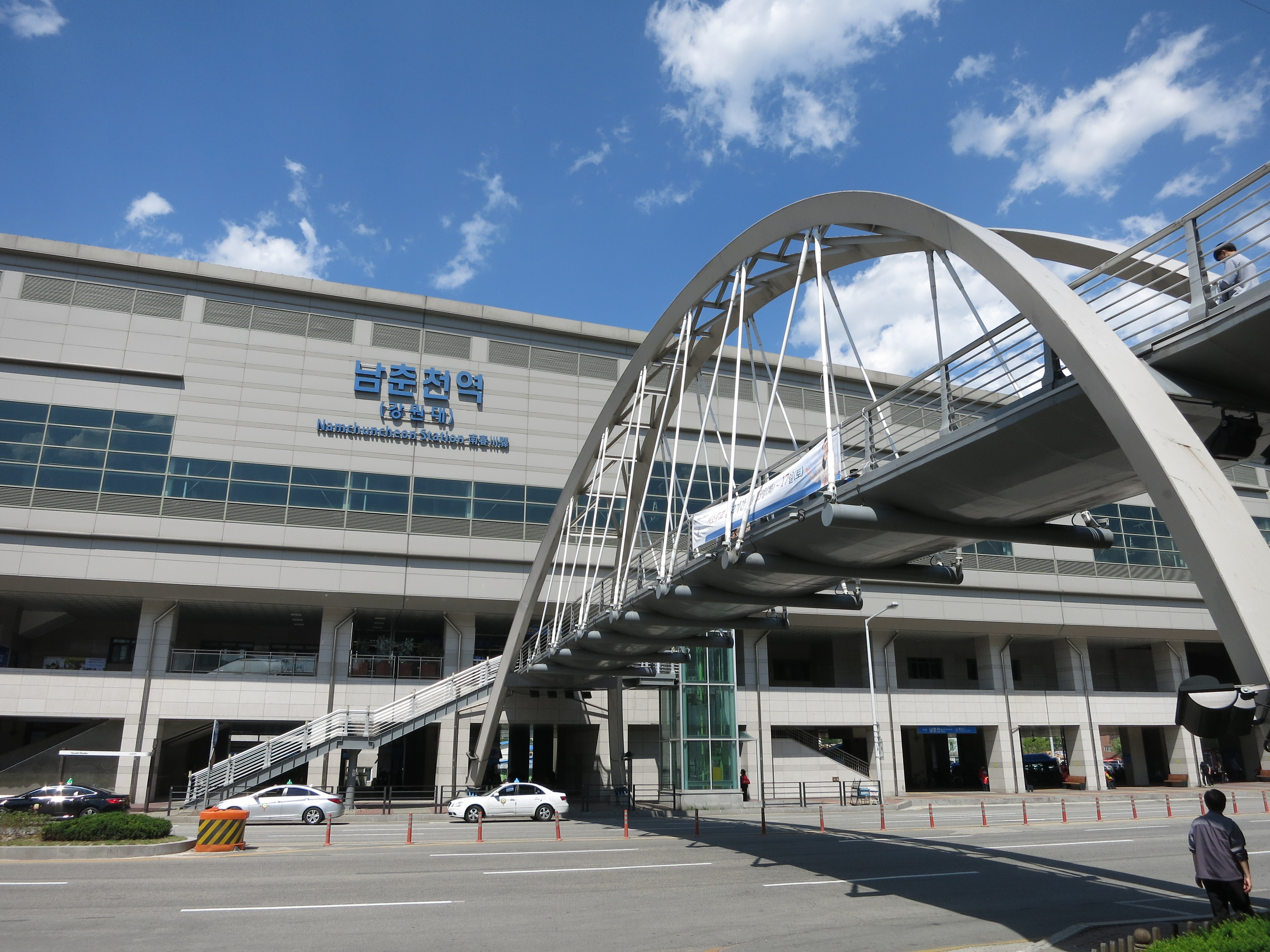
- Namchuncheon station

Korean name
- Hangul: 남춘천역
- Hanja: 南春川驛
- Revised Romanization: Namchuncheon-yeok
- McCune–Reischauer: namch'unch'ŏn-yŏk

General information
- Location: 375-8 Toegye-dong, 2 Namchunno, Chuncheon-si, Gangwon-do
- Operator: Korail
- Line: Gyeongchun Line
- Platforms: 2
- Tracks: 2
- Connections: Chuncheon Bus Terminal

Construction
- Structure type: Aboveground

History
- Opened: December 21, 2010

Services
Preceding station	Seoul Metropolitan Subway	Following station
Gimyujeong towards Cheongnyangni or Kwangwoon University	Gyeongchun Line	Chuncheon Terminus
Gangchon towards Cheongnyangni	Gyeongchun Line Express	Chuncheon Terminus
Preceding station	Korail	Following station
Gangchon towards Yongsan	ITX-Cheongchun	Chuncheon Terminus
Location

Namchuncheon station (Korean: 남춘천역; lit. 'South Chuncheon station', Abbr:Kangwondae station; 강원대역) is a train station on the Gyeongchun Line in Chuncheon, South Korea, operated by Korail. This station is 78.6 kilometres from its final western destination, Sangbong station.

== History ==
On July 20, 1939, this station had been operated under the name of Seongsan station (성산역), however, on April 1, 1940, the name of station was changed into Namchuncheon station (남춘천역) and this name has been kept since then. On October 27, 1971, the old station (closed since December 21, 2010) lasted almost 40 years. On September 30, 2005, with the kickoff of the construction of new twin-track electronic rapid-transit system, this station has been used as the eastern terminus of old Gyeongchun Line, due to the suspension of using Chuncheon station during that period, and it run successfully until December 20, 2010. A brand-new station has been built, and since December 21, 2010, this station operates as the gateway to Chuncheon city. This station is also called as 'Kangwon Nat'l Univ. station' (강원대역), because the Chuncheon (primary) campus of Kangwon National University nearly locates from this station.

== Current status ==
With the nearby Chuncheon bus terminal, it also operates as a transport hub of Chuncheon city. Although, since December 21, 2010 when the electrification and double-tracking of Gyeongchun line to Chuncheon station was completed, this station is still busy due to the heavy-populated South Chuncheon (Toegye-dong and Seoksa-dong area; almost half of the city's population) residents, and also incorporates the Seoul Metropolitan Subway system. From about 5am to 11pm, train service operates almost every 20 minutes toward Sangbong, Cheongnyangni, Kwangwoon Univ., and PyeongnaeHopyeong, and express service (급행열차) is being operated two times only in weekdays.

== Station layout ==
L2; Platforms	Side platform, doors will open on the left
L2; Platforms	Eastbound	Gyeongchun Line Local toward Chuncheon (Terminus) → Gyeongchun Line Express toward Chuncheon (Terminus) →
L2; Platforms	Westbound	← Gyeongchun Line Express toward Cheongnyangni (Gangchon) ← Gyeongchun Line Local toward Cheongnyangni or Kwangwoon Univ. (Gimyujeong)
L2; Platforms	Side platform, doors will open on the left

L1; Concourse	Lobby	Customer Service, Shops, Vending machines, ATMs

G	Street level	Exit

== Facilities near Namchuncheon station ==
As mentioned, the KNU Chuncheon (main) campus is located, as well as a state-of-the-art digital regional broadcasting centre of Korean Broadcasting System (a.k.a. KBS Chuncheon Broadcasting Branch Office, KBS춘천방송총국), Chuncheon Police Station (춘천경찰서), several shopping centre such as Chuncheon Pungmul Sijang (춘천풍물시장, traditional conventional market, 5-minute-walk), megamall E-mart and Lotte Mart (both of them as 'Chuncheon branch'). Chuncheon Bus Terminal, both intercity and express, also located just about 10 minutes walk from this station.

== City transportation ==
This station also operates its service to Gyeongchun Line's eastern terminus Chuncheon station, which is located 2.7 km northwest of this station; however, most of local residents and college students seldom use it. Metropolitan bus service from this station toward central business district (Myeong-dong 명동 or Jungang-ro 중앙로, famous for soap series Winter Sonata겨울연가), North (Hupyeong-dong 후평동), Central (Hyoja-dong 효자동), and Southend (Hakgok-ri 학곡리) connects frequently, however, most of South Chuncheon (Toegye and Seoksa) residential area where massively populated, still rarely.

== Particular use ==
On weekends and Fridays, especially during semesters, this train station is heavily used due to the many college students who live outside Chuncheon. Following a new double-track rapid transit system introduced to this (and Chuncheon) station, both numerous mountain-climbing favourites and gourmets from Seoul, typically both are the aged, came to Chuncheon to enjoy their designated trips through one or more days.

== See also ==
- Chuncheon
- Kangwon National University (Chuncheon campus)
- Chuncheon National University of Education
- Chuncheon station (abbr.:Hallymdae station)
- Seoul-Chuncheon Expressway (highway)
- Transportation in South Korea
