= Gimyujeong station =

Train station in Chuncheon, South Korea

김유정; Gimyujeong
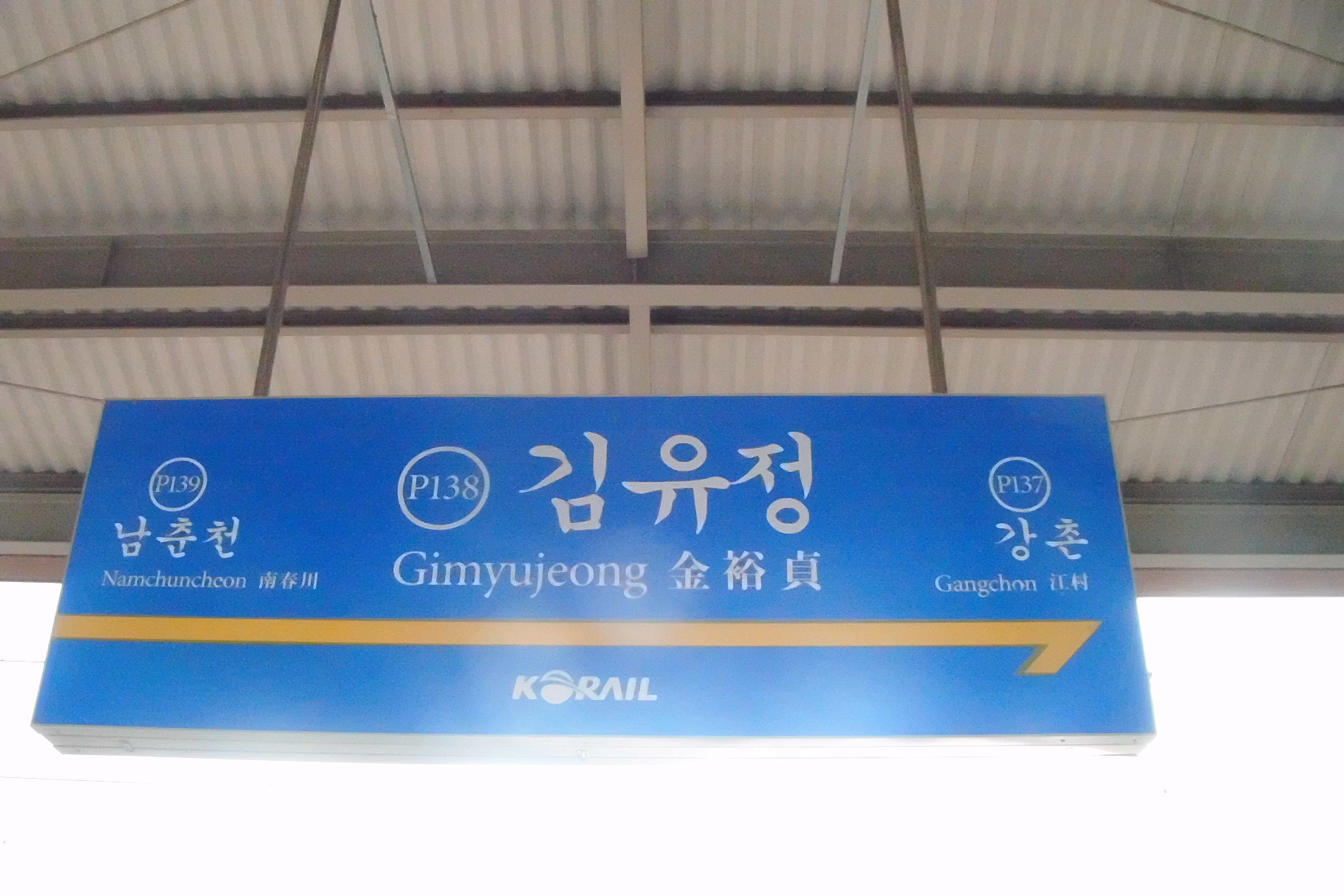

Korean name
- Hangul: 김유정역
- Hanja: 金裕貞驛
- Revised Romanization: Gimyujeong-yeok
- McCune–Reischauer: Kimyujŏngyŏk

General information
- Location: 859-3 Jeungni, 1435; Kimyujeongno, Sindong-myeon, Chuncheon-si, Gangwon-do
- Coordinates: 37.81938°N 127.71600°E
- Operator: Korail
- Line: Gyeongchun Line
- Platforms: 2
- Tracks: 4

Construction
- Structure type: Aboveground

History
- Opened: December 21, 2010
- Former names: Sinnam

Services
Preceding station	Seoul Metropolitan Subway	Following station
Gangchon towards Cheongnyangni or Kwangwoon University	Gyeongchun Line	Namchuncheon towards Chuncheon
Location

Gimyujeong station (formerly Sinnam station) is a railway station of the Gyeongchun Line in Sindong-myeon, Chuncheon-si, Gangwon-do, South Korea. It is named after the Korean novelist Gim Yu-jeong.

== Station layout ==
L1; Platforms	Island platform, doors will open on the left
L1; Platforms	Eastbound	Gyeongchun Line Chuncheon (Namchuncheon) →
L1; Platforms	Westbound	← Gyeongchun Line toward Cheongnyangni or Kwangwoon Univ. (Gangchon)
L1; Platforms	Island platform, doors will open on the left

L1; Concourse	Lobby	Customer Service, Shops, Vending machines, ATMs

G	Street level	Exit
