= Jade Garden =

Arboretum in Chuncheon, South Korea

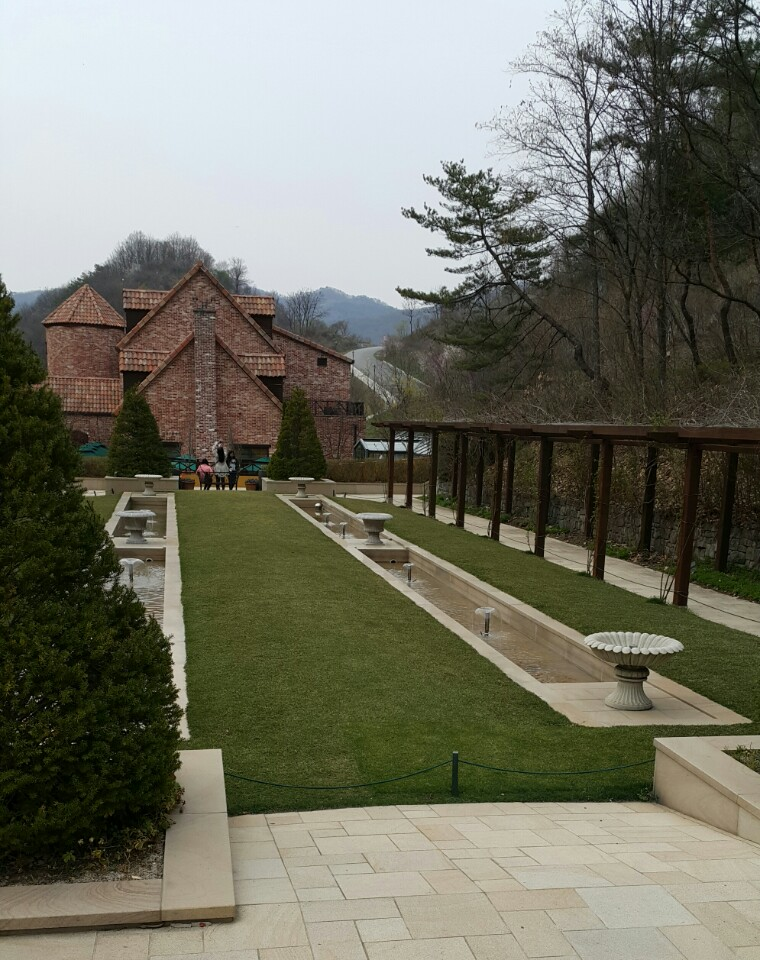
- Jade Garden
- Interactive map of Jade Garden
- Location: Chuncheon
- Coordinates: 37.8325°N 127.5423°E
- Opened: 2011

Korean name
- Hangul: 제이드 가든 수목원
- Hanja: 제이드 가든 樹木園
- Revised Romanization: Jeideu gadeun sumogwon
- McCune–Reischauer: Cheidŭ kadŭn sumogwŏn

Jade Garden (Korean: 제이드 가든 수목원) is an arboretum located in Chuncheon, South Korea. The garden opened in April 2011. Jade Garden provides walk-through tours and experimental programs, including gardening. The garden is recognised as the filming site of popular Korean television dramas such as That Winter, the Wind Blows, Angel's Last Mission: Love and Young Lady and Gentleman.

The Jade Garden is split into three thematic zones with different biomes and plant types: European, Landscape, and Skyview.

== Gallery ==
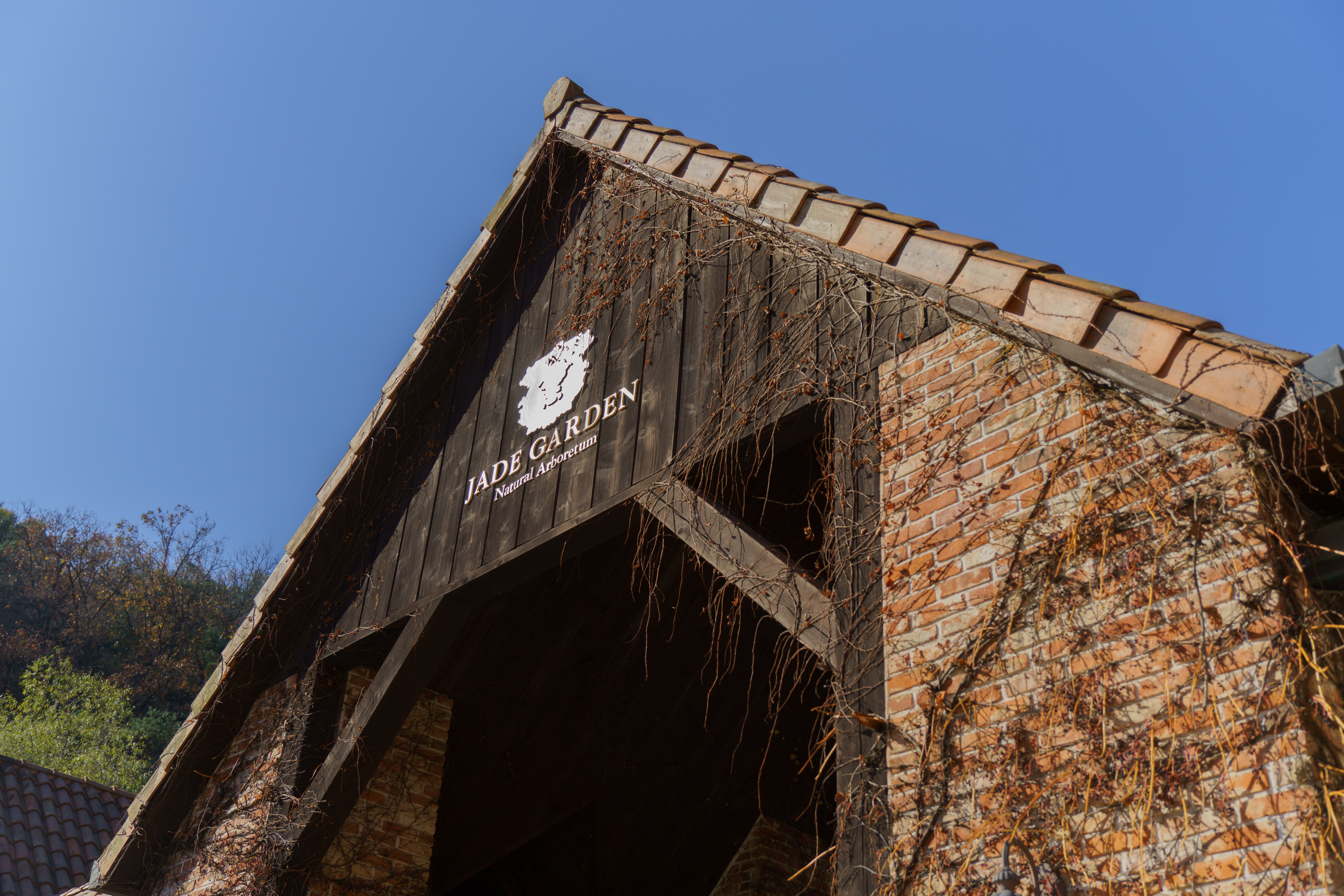

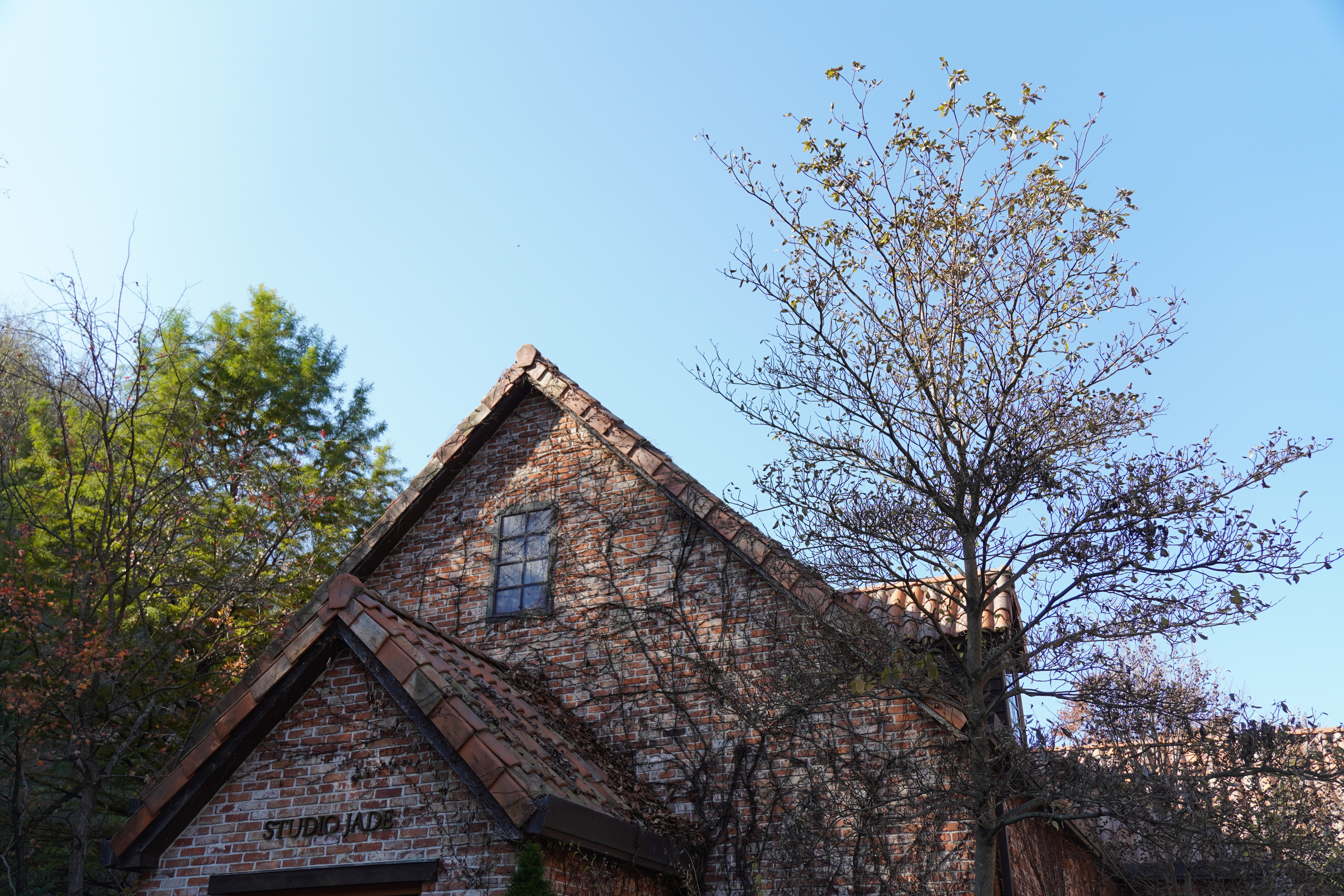

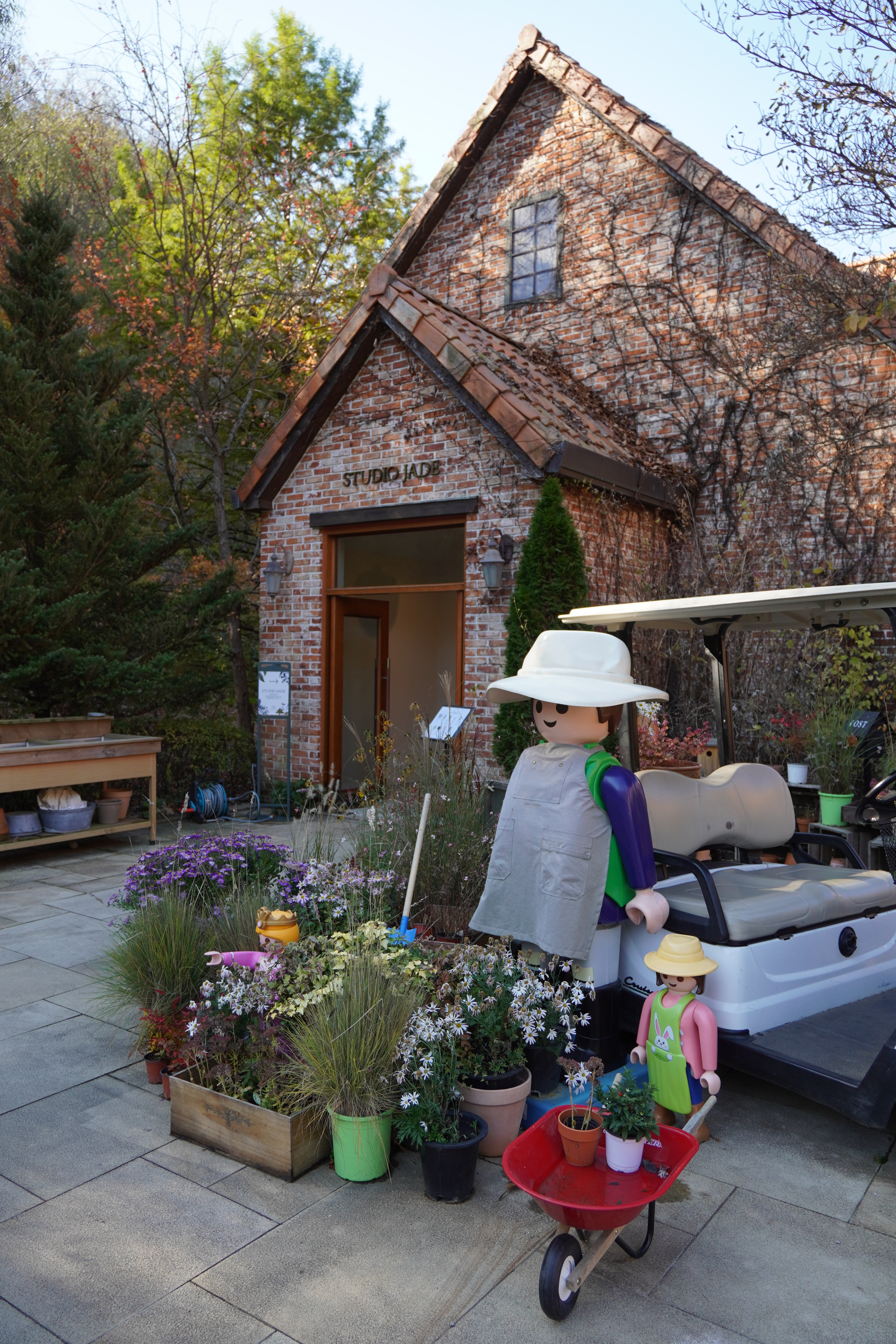
A gift shop

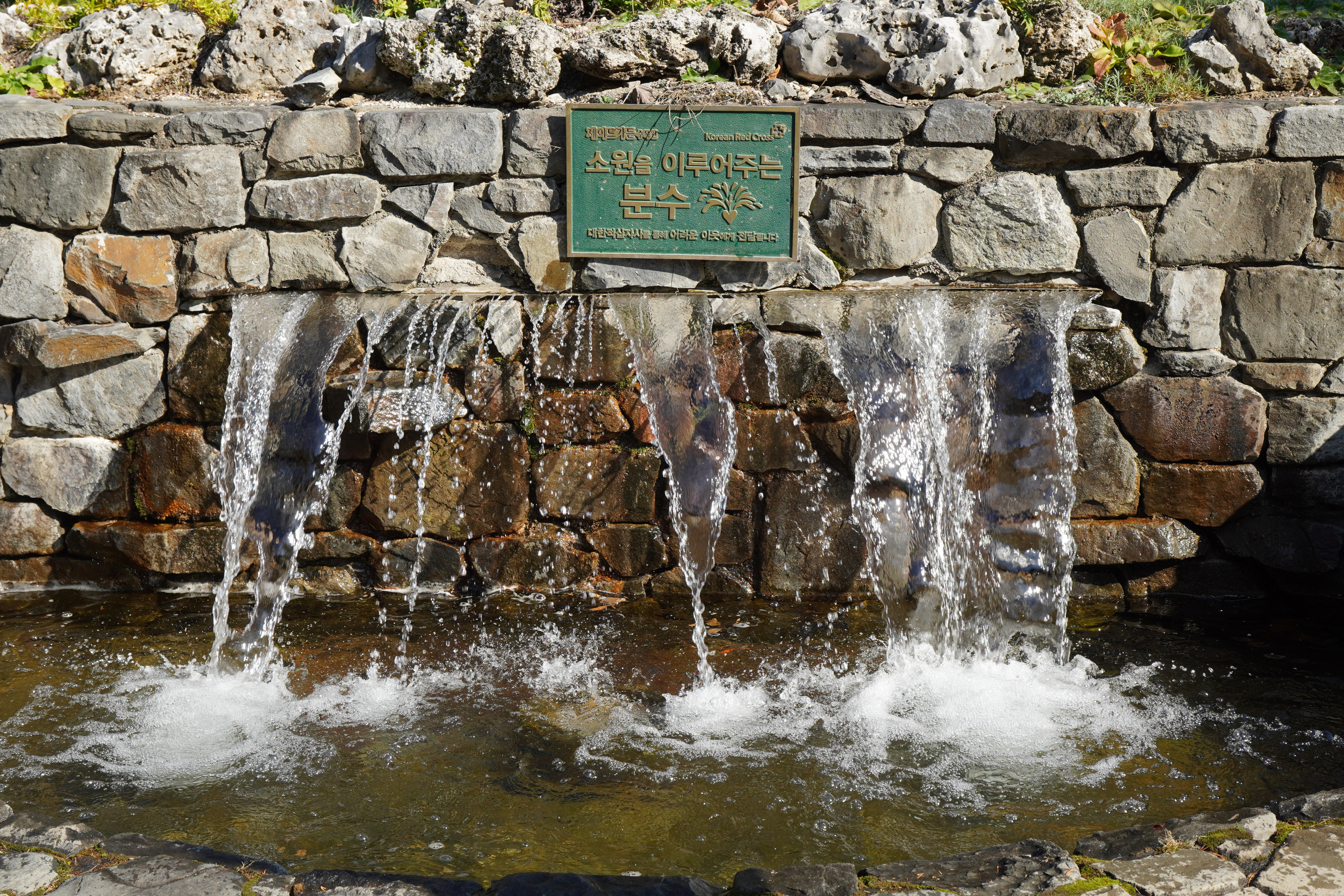
A fountain that makes dreams come true

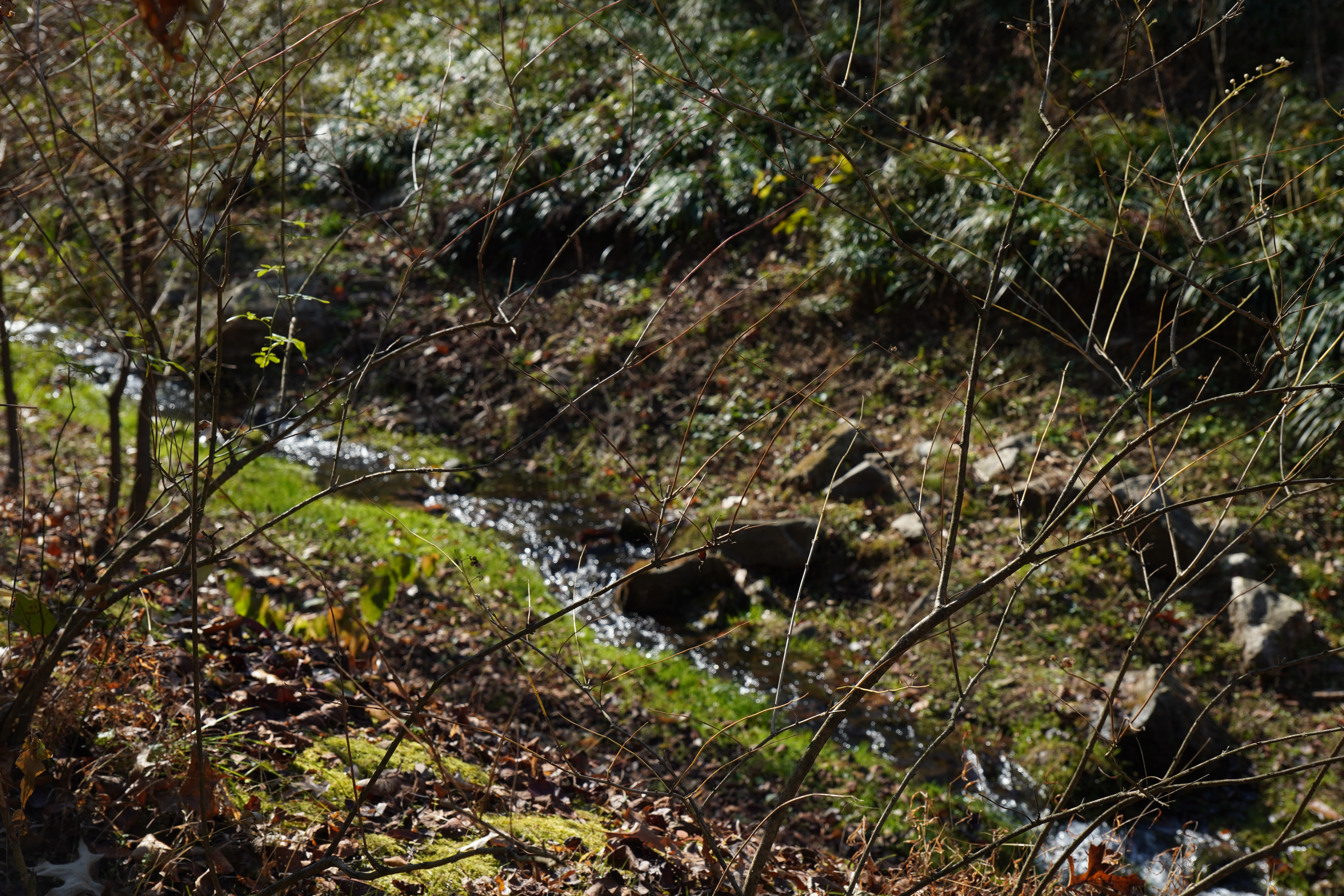

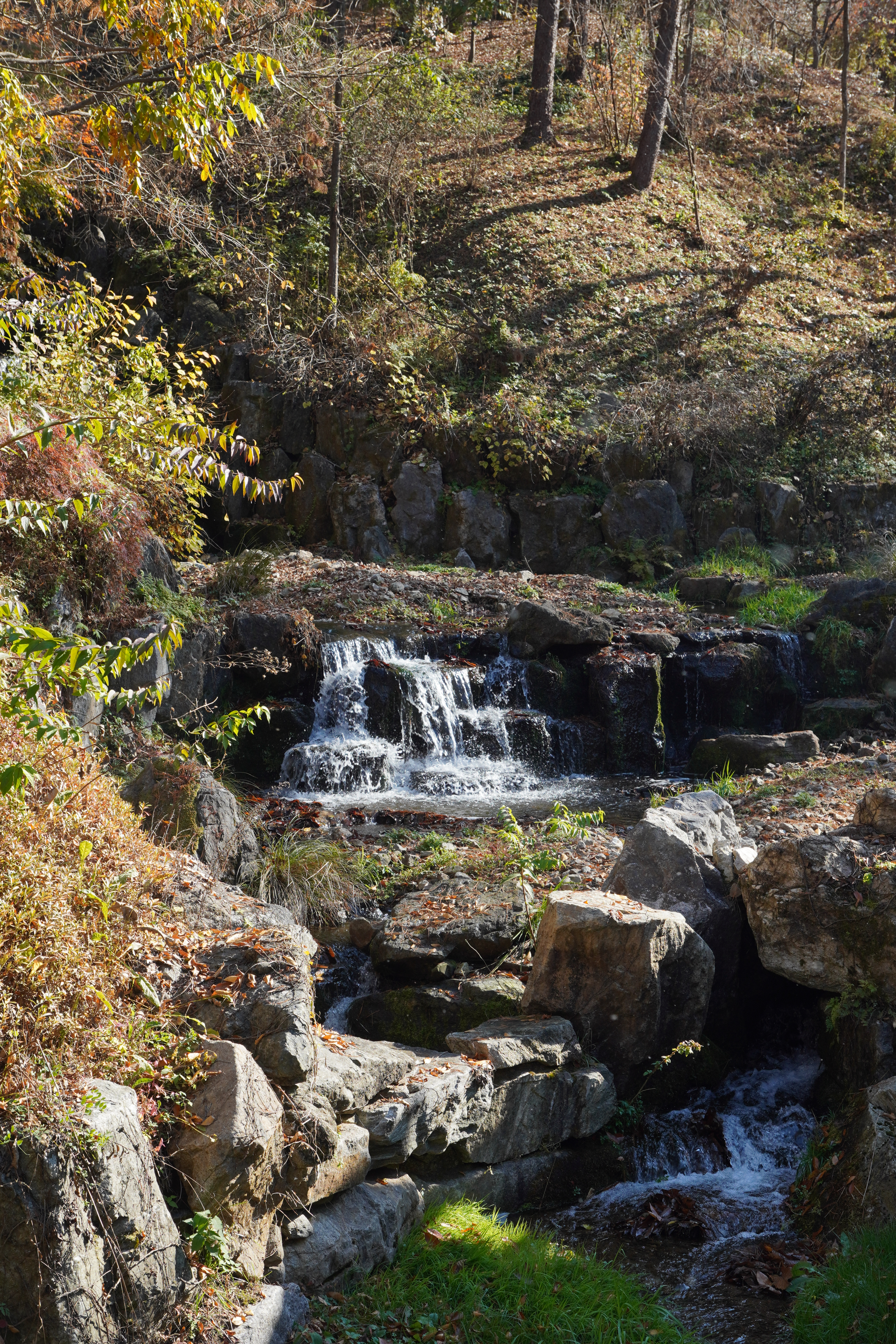

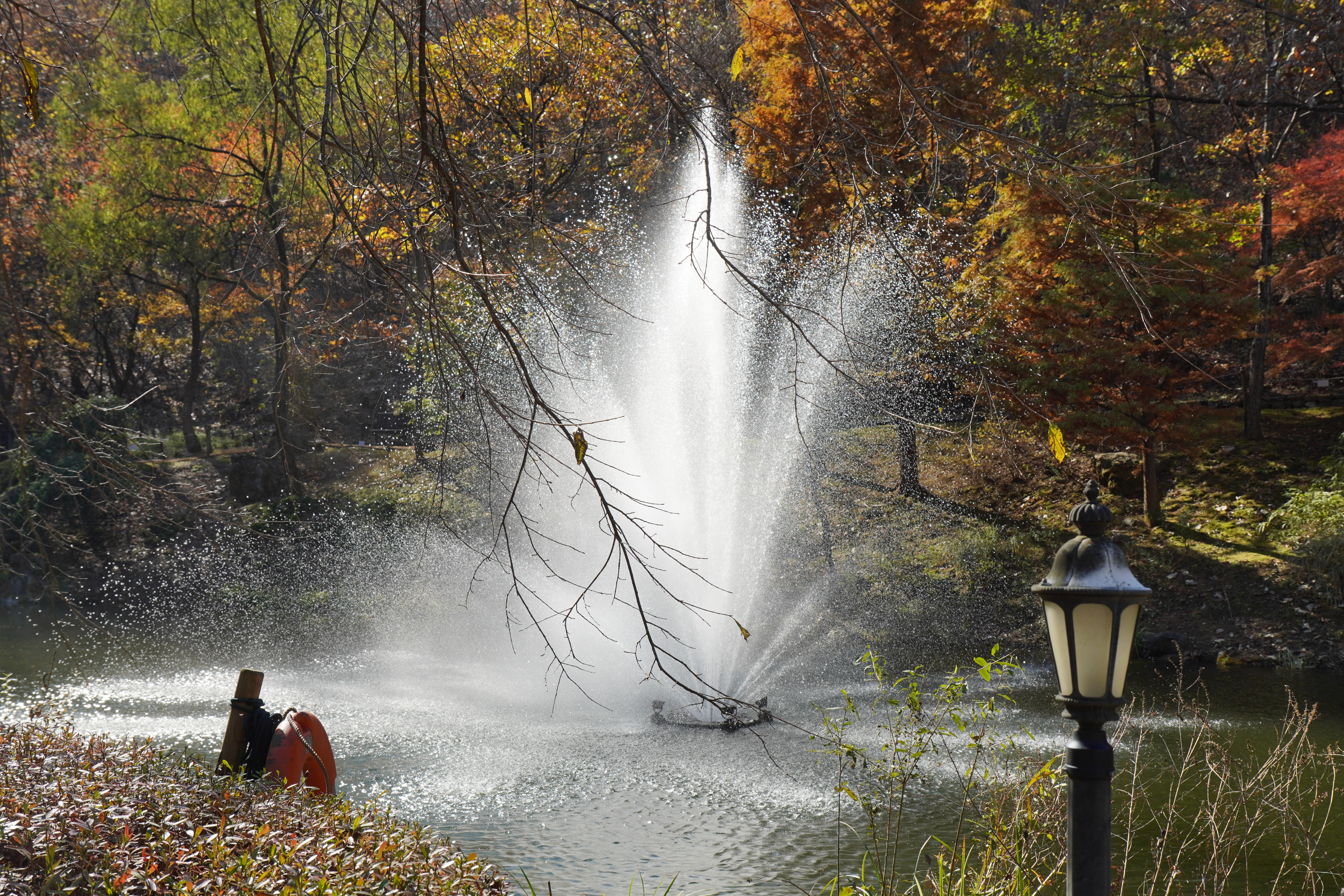

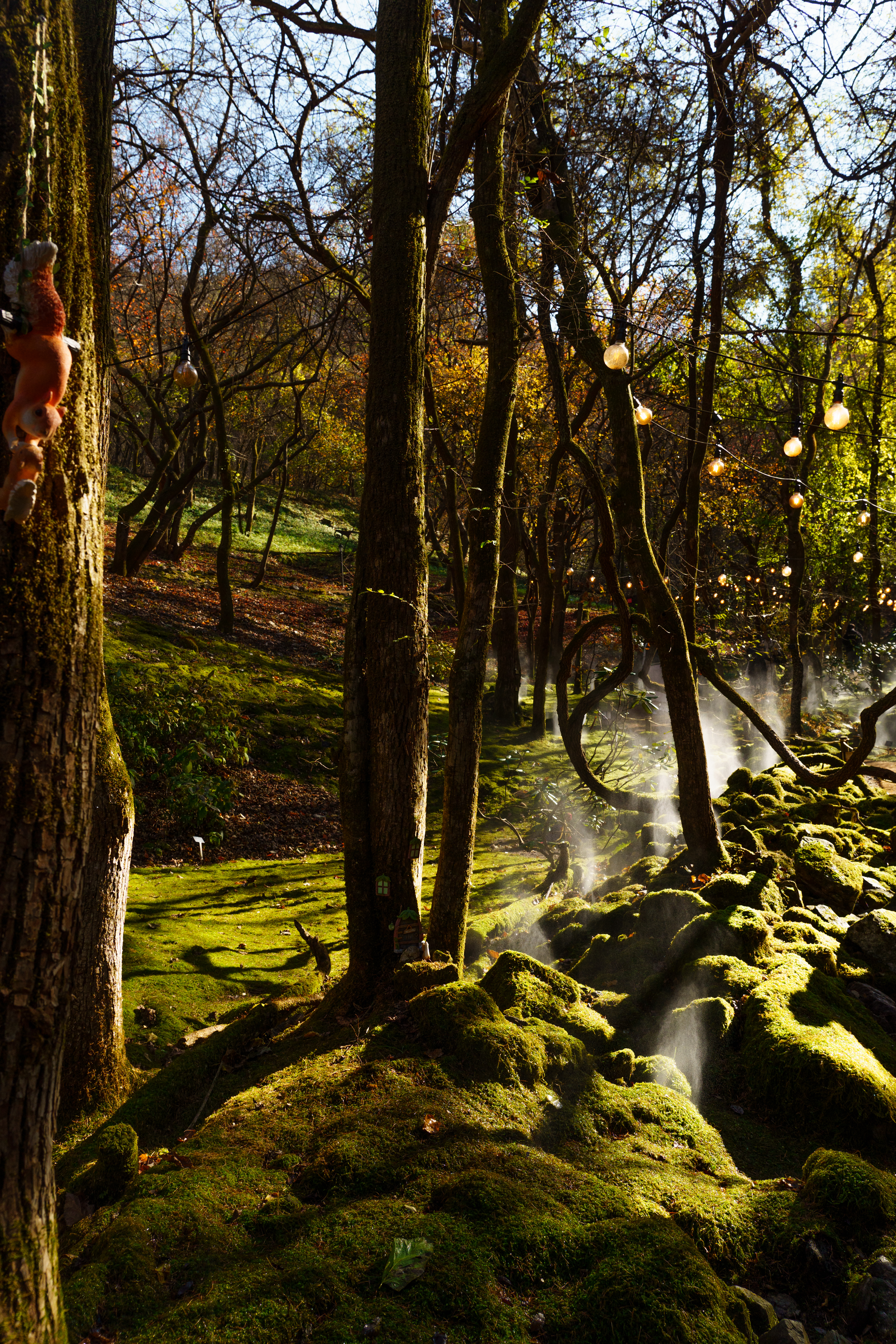
Moss Garden
