= Cheongpyeongsa =

Buddhist temple in South Korea

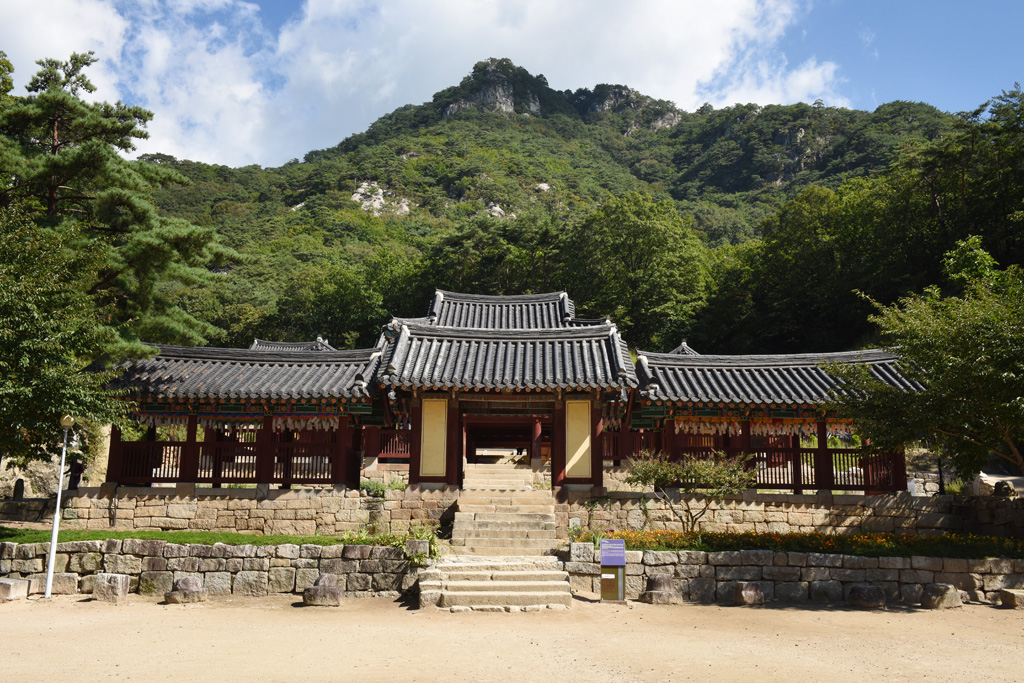
- Cheongpyeongsa in 2015

- Location within South Korea

Religion
- Affiliation: Jogye Order of Korean Buddhism

Location
- Location: 810, Obongsan-gil, Buksan-myeon, Chuncheon, Gangwon Province
- Country: South Korea
- Coordinates: 37°59′11″N 127°48′31″E

Architecture
- Founder: Yeonghyeon
- Completed: 973

Korean name
- Hangul: 청평사
- Hanja: 淸平寺
- RR: Cheongpyeongsa
- MR: Ch'ŏngp'yŏngsa

Cheongpyeongsa (Korean: 청평사; Hanja: 淸平寺) is a Buddhist temple on the slopes of Obongsan in Chuncheon, Gangwon Province, South Korea. It was built in 973 by Yeonghyeon and rebuilt by Bou in 1555. Most of it was destroyed in the Korean War and was rebuilt in the 1970s to 1980s. It houses the cultural properties Hoejeonmun and Goryeo Seonwon, and is affiliated with the Jogye Order.

== History ==
=== Goryeo ===
Yeonghyeon built the temple in 973 and named it Baegam Seonwon (백암선원; 白岩禪院). The temple was later abandoned.

In 1068, Yi Ui reconstructed the temple and named it Bohyeonwon (보현원; 普賢院). In 1089, Yi Ja-hyeon, Yi Ui's son, abandoned his government post and resided there. He named the mountain Cheongpyeong (청평; 淸平) and the temple Munsuwon (문수원; 文殊院), inspired by Munsu Bosal. He also built 8 hermitages called Gyeonseongam (견성암; 見性庵), Yangsinam (양신암; 養神庵), Chilseongam (칠성암; 七星庵), Deungunam (등운암; 騰雲庵), Bokuiam (복희암, 福禧庵), Jijangam (지장암; 地藏庵), Sigam (식암; 息庵), and Seondongam (선동암; 仙洞庵).

=== Joseon ===
After the Gyeyu Coup (coup by Grand Prince Suyang in 1453), Kim Sisŭp, one of the Six living ministers (six scholar-officials who remained loyal to King Danjong), abandoned his government post and stayed at Sehyangwon (세향원) in Cheongpyeongsa. In 1555, Bou renamed the temple to Cheongpyeongsa and newly built most of the buildings.

=== Modern era ===
Geungnakjeon burnt down in 1947 and gugwangjeon (구광전; 九光殿) and saseongjeon (사성전; 四聖殿) were destroyed during the Korean War. Gongcheol rebuilt geungnakbojeon and samseonggak in 1977 and Seokjin rebuilt daeungjeon in 1988.

== Legend of the lovesick snake ==
A commoner fell in love with the daughter of Emperor Taizong of Tang (Note: In other variations, the man is a monk or carpenter and the princess is from the Yuan dynasty or Song dynasty.) but was unable to fulfill his love because of their difference in social status. The man was eventually killed by the emperor and after his death, he was reborn as a "lovesick snake" (상사뱀) and clung to the princess’ leg.

The princess tried to remove the snake in many ways but had no success. She headed to Cheongpyeongsa after deciding to pray to Buddha and spent a night in a cave. The next day, when she told the snake that she would go to the temple, it let go of her. However, when it tried to follow her into the temple after waiting, it was struck by lightning in front of Hoejeonmun and died. In gratitude to Buddha, she built a three-story stone pagoda. The cave where she stayed later became known as “Princess Cave" (공주굴; gongjugul) and the pagoda was called “Princess Pagoda" (공주탑; gongjutap).

The legend reflects the core Buddhist doctrines of Karma and Samsara: the man who felt lust toward the princess died bearing evil karma and was reincarnated as a snake. The snake not being able to pass Hoejeonmun symbolizes its re-entry to Samsara.

== Cultural properties ==
- Hoejeonmun (회전문; 廻轉門) is a gate built instead of sacheonwangmun to enlighten sentient beings of Samsara. As it is important for research on 16th-century architecture, it is designated as Treasure.
- Goryeo Seonwon (고려선원; 高麗禪園) is a Buddhist garden consisting of a valley, Yeongji (영지; 影池; lit. 'shadow pond'), boulders, and Gusong Waterfall (구송폭포). (Note: Also called Guseong Waterfall (구성폭포) as it produces nine sounds.) It is considered as one of the oldest gardens and designated as Scenic Site due to its excellent landscape.
- Three-Story Stone Pagoda of Cheongpyeongsa (청평사 삼층석탑), thought to have been made in early Goryeo, follows the style of Unified Silla stone pagodas. It is designated as Cultural Heritage Material of Gangwon Province.
- Cheongpyeongsa Site (청평사지) is designated as Monument of Gangwon Province.
- Record of Munsuwon (문수원기; 文殊院記) is a stele made in 1130 that records the life of Yi Ja-hyeon. It was completely destroyed in the Korean War and restored in 2008.
- Jijangsiwangdo of Cheongpyeongsa, a painting made by Bou in 1562, shows characteristics of 16th-century royal Buddhist paintings such as various patterns in gold pigment. It is currently housed in Komeiji, Hiroshima Prefecture, Japan.

=== Lost cultural property ===
- Sutra Stele of Munsusa (문수사 장경비) was made in late Goryeo to commemorate the deposition of Buddhist scriptures brought from the Yuan dynasty at Munsusa under an imperial order and donations from the Yuan imperial family to wish for the well-being of princes during the reign of Yesün Temür. Although the stele was lost before the modern era, Chuncheon City initiated a project to restore it in 2012.

== Facilities ==
Cheongpyeongsa consists of the following buildings: Hoejeonmun, Gyeongullu, gwaneumjeon, nahanjeon, daeungjeon, geungnakbojeon, samseonggak, beomjonggak, and yosachae.

Visitors can take a boat from Soyang Dam to Cheongpyeongsa.

== Gallery ==
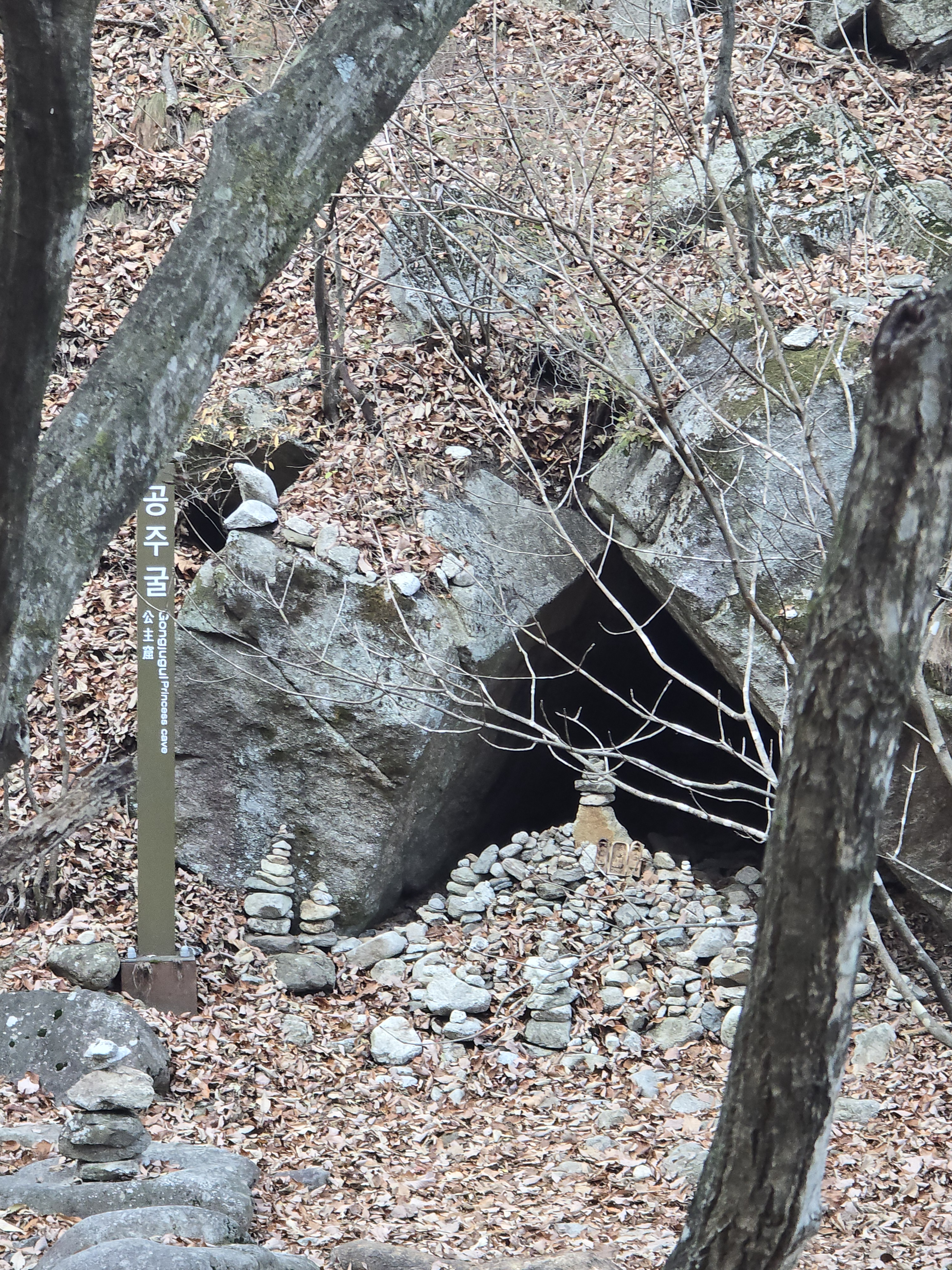
Princess Cave

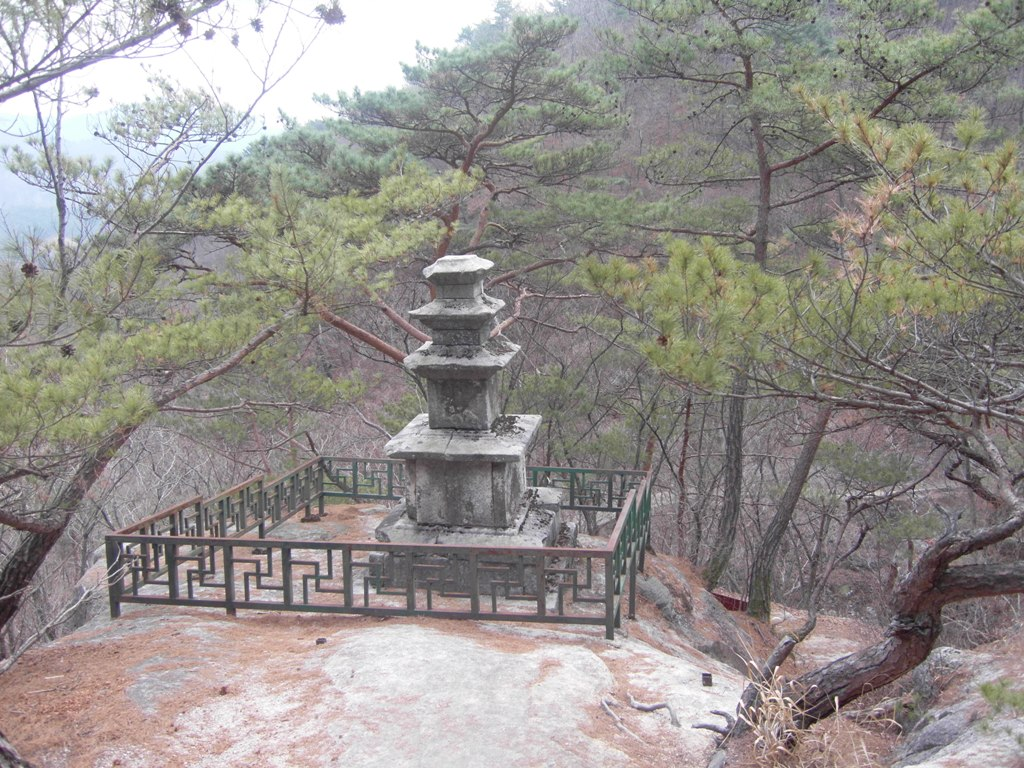
Princess Pagoda

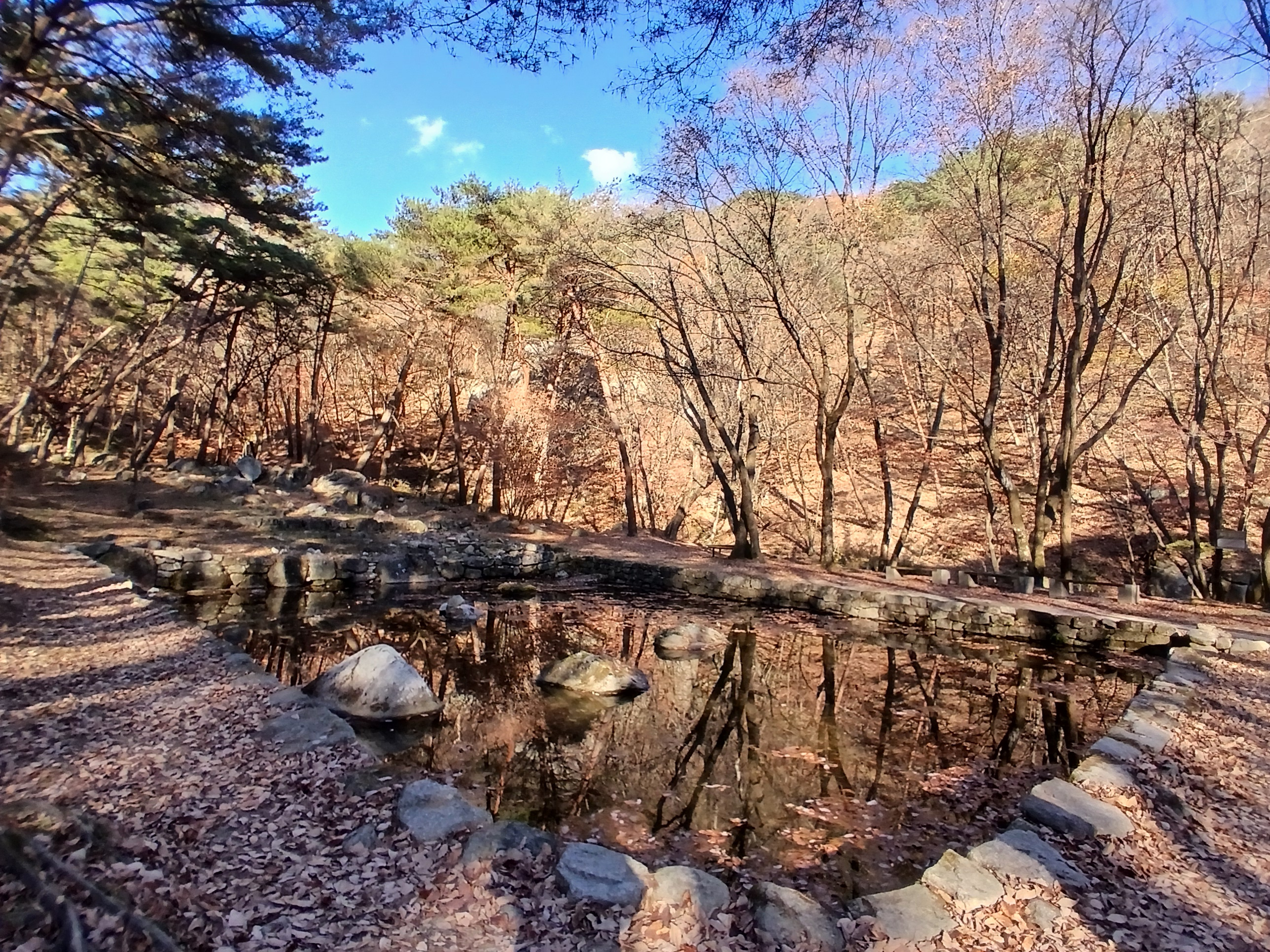
Yeongji

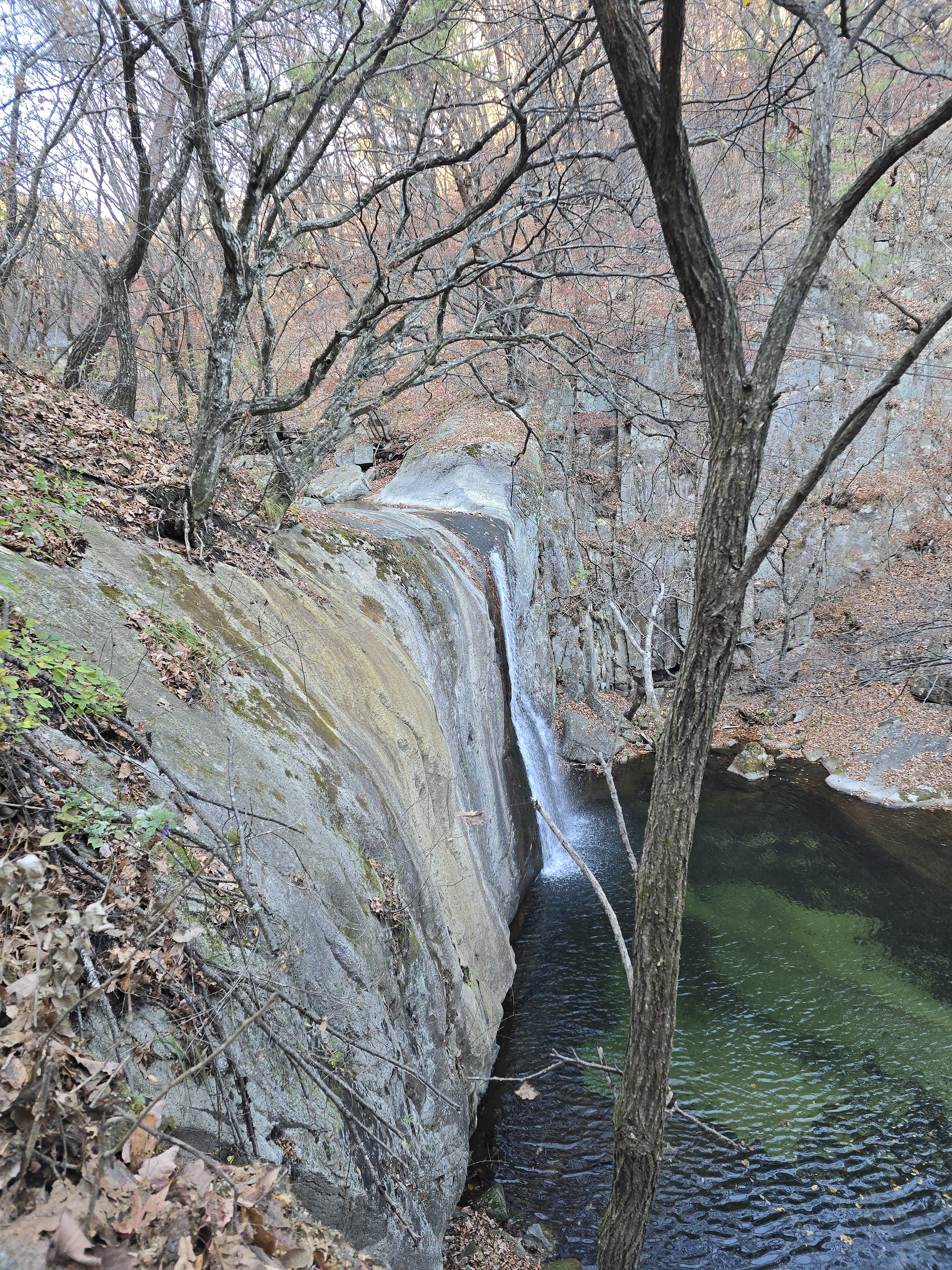
Gusong Waterfall

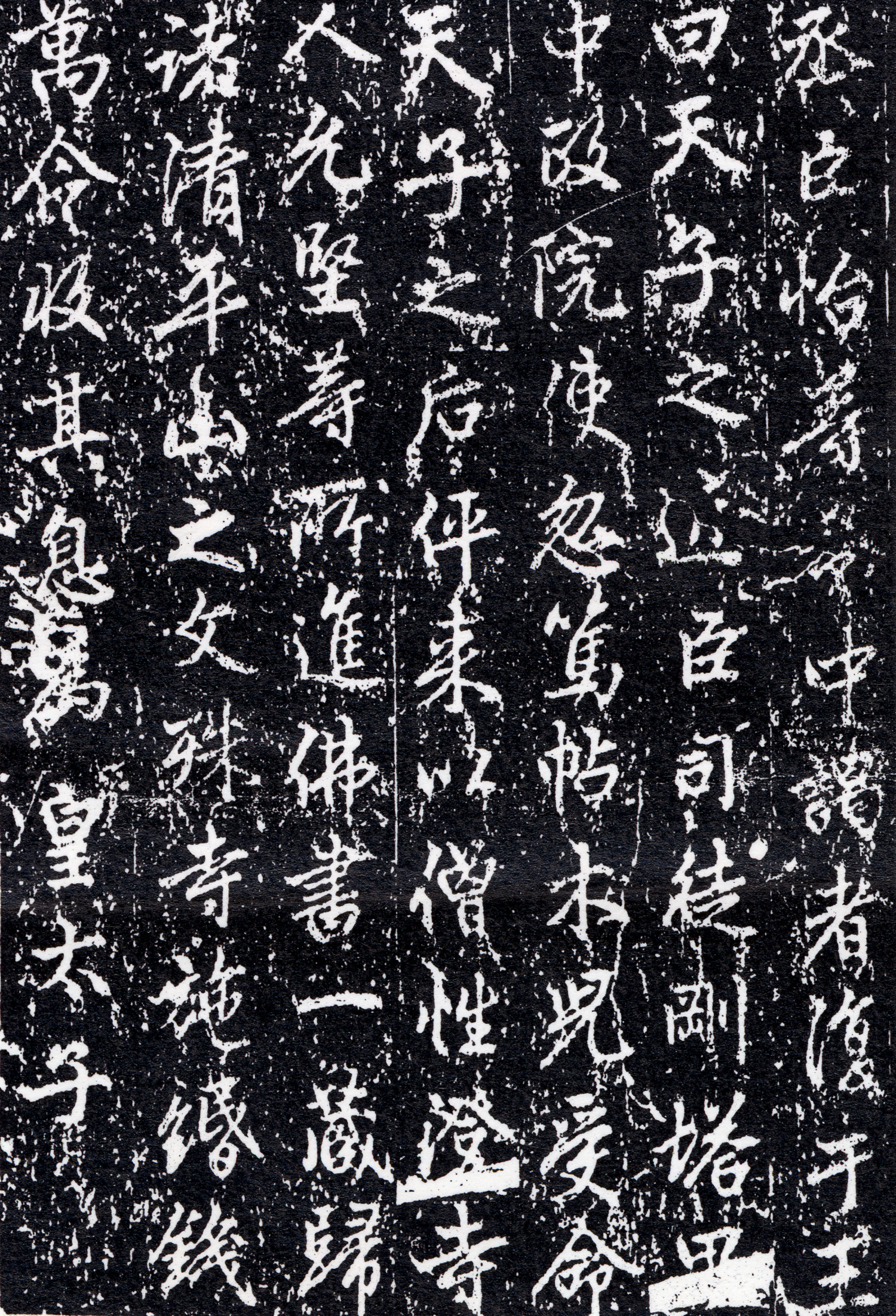
Rubbing of Sutra Stele of Munsusa

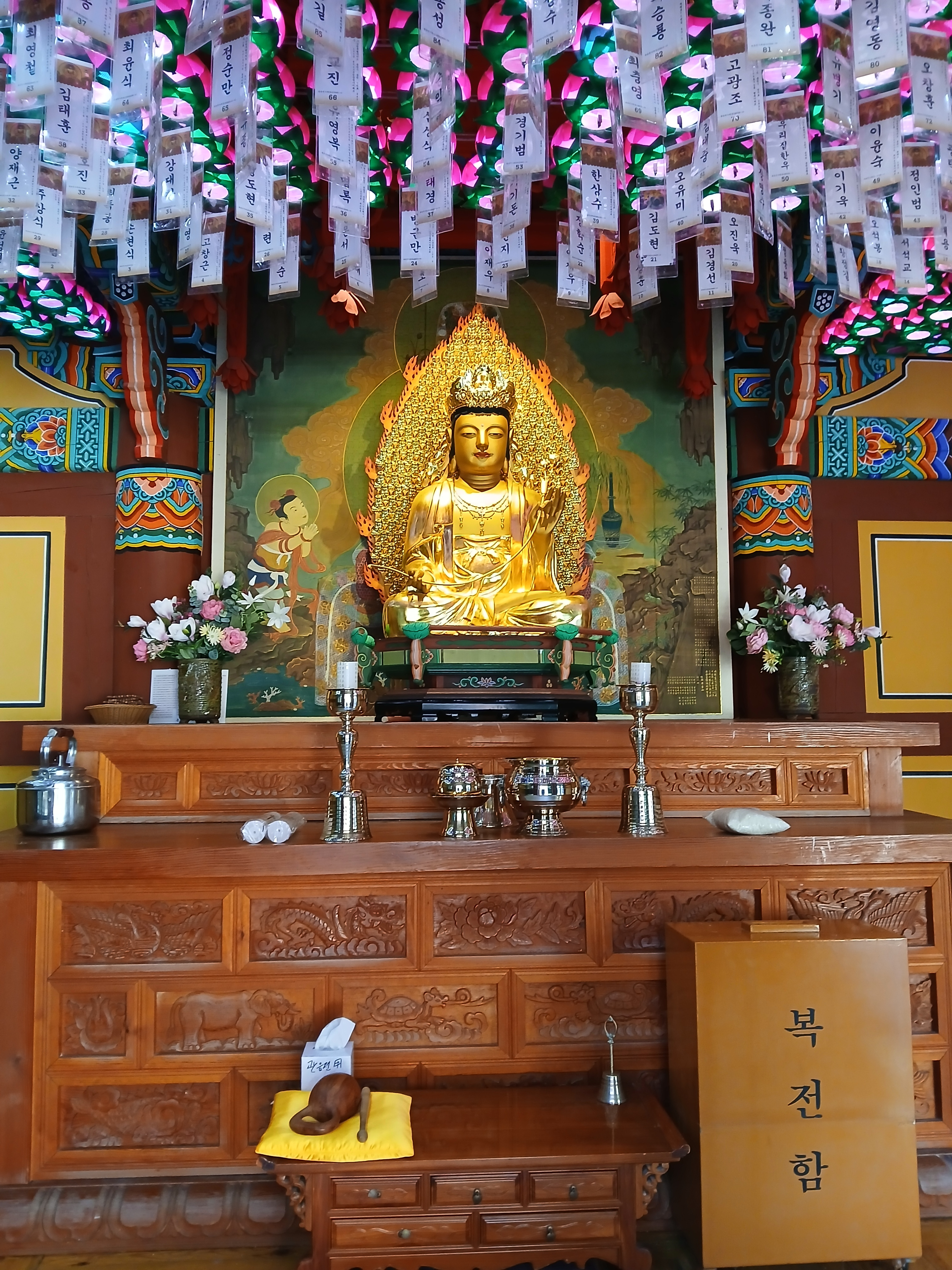
Gwaneumjeon

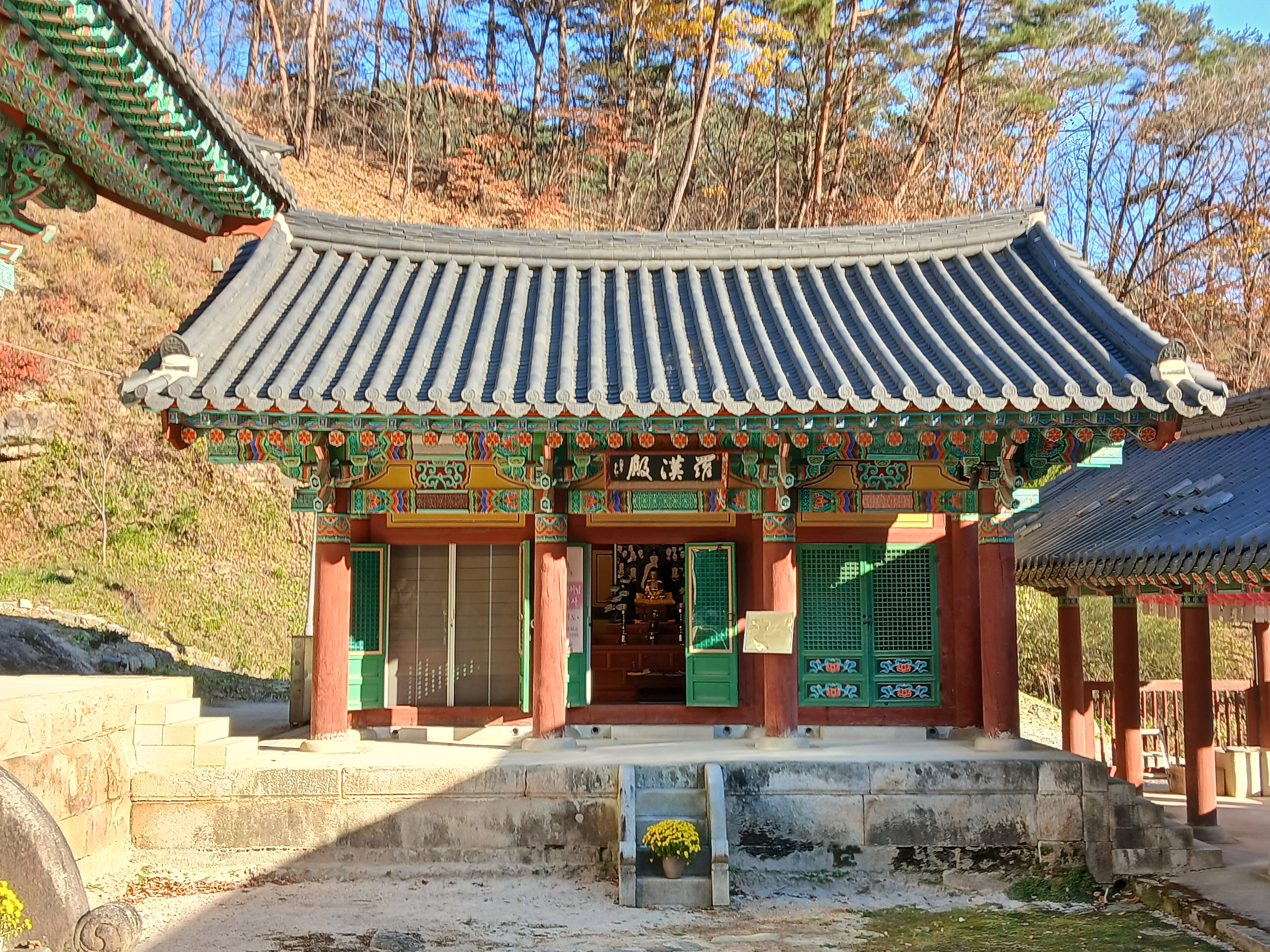
Nahanjeon

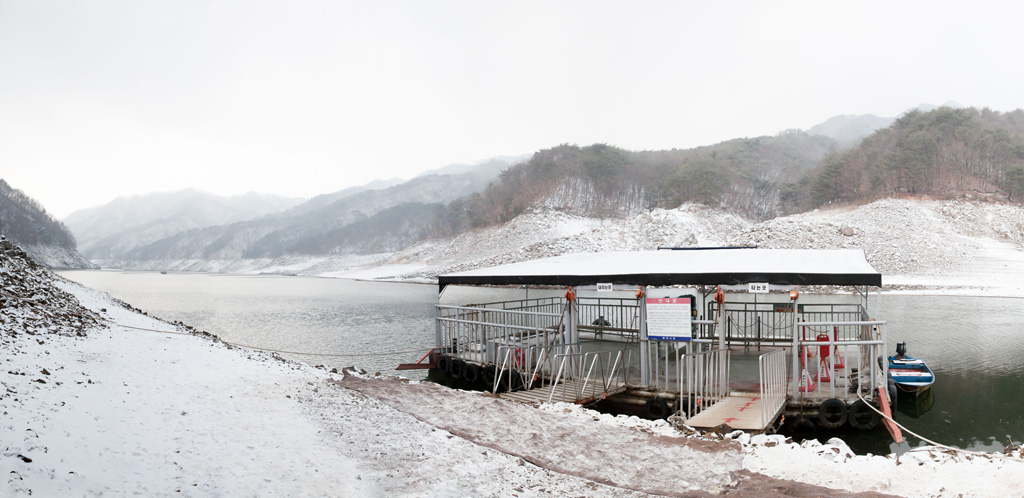
Dock to take a boat to Cheongpyeongsa
