= Hallym Sacred Heart University =

University in Chuncheon, South Korea

Coordinates: 37.89890°N 127.75645°E

- Hangul: 한림성심대학교
- Hanja: 翰林聖心大學校
- RR: Hallim seongsim daehakgyo
- MR: Hallim sŏngsim taehakkyo

Hallym Sacred Heart University (Korean: 한림성심대학교) is a private junior college located in Chuncheon, Gangwon Province, South Korea.

In 1939, it was established as a nurse training center affiliated with Chuncheon Hospital. In 1993, it changed its name to Hallym Junior College. In 2011, it changed its name to Hallym Sacred Heart University.
