= Soyang River =

River in South Korea

Coordinates: 37°53′48″N 127°43′23″E

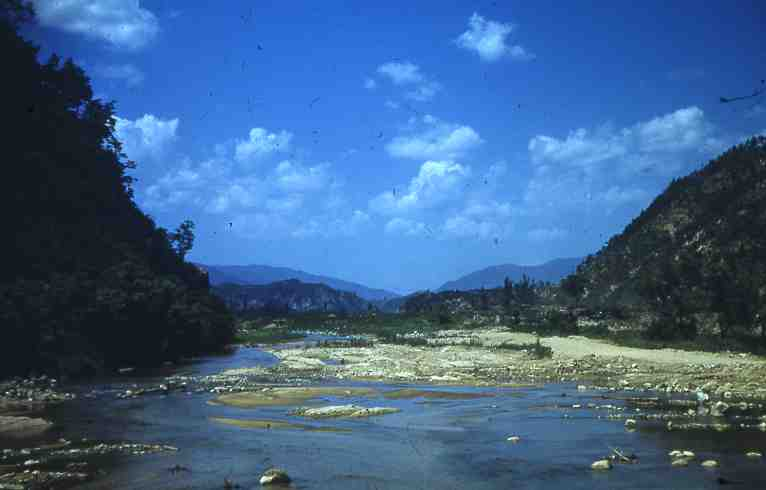
- 1951 appearance

Physical characteristics
- Source: Inje County, Gangwon Province, South Korea
- Length: 166.2 km (103.3 mi)

Korean name
- Hangul: 소양강
- Hanja: 昭陽江
- RR: Soyanggang
- MR: Soyanggang

Soyang River (Korean: 소양강) is a river in South Korea. It originates from Inje County, Gangwon Province and joins the Bukhan River in Chuncheon. Bukcheon and Bangcheon of Seoraksan and Naerincheon of Gyebangsan join the river. 10km from the junction with Bukhan River, Soyang Dam was built in 1973.

== History ==
During the Joseon Dynasty, Soyanggangchang was installed to store and transport crops (세곡) collected in the upper Bukhan River area to Seoul.

In 1951, Battle of the Soyang River (현리전투) took place between People's Volunteer Army and Korean People's Army vs Republic of Korea Armed Forces and United States Army.

== In culture ==
Soyangjeong (소양정; 昭陽亭) is a pavilion built in the Three Kingdoms period of Korea. It was rebuilt in 1966 after it was lost in the Korean War. It is designated as Gangwon Province Cultural Heritage Material.

Soyanggang River Festival, started in 1966 with the name Gaenari Festival, is held every September to October for the succession of local culture and regional harmony.

"Maiden of Soyang River" is 1970 song by Kim Tae-hee. In 2005, a statue of a maiden was built to commemorate the song.

== Ecosystem ==
Brown trout, one of the 100 of the World's Worst Invasive Alien Species, has inhabited the river since the 2010s. In 2024 research, Pungitius sinensis, an endangered species, and brown trout made up 56% and 21% of the total fish population of Soyang River.

== Gallery ==
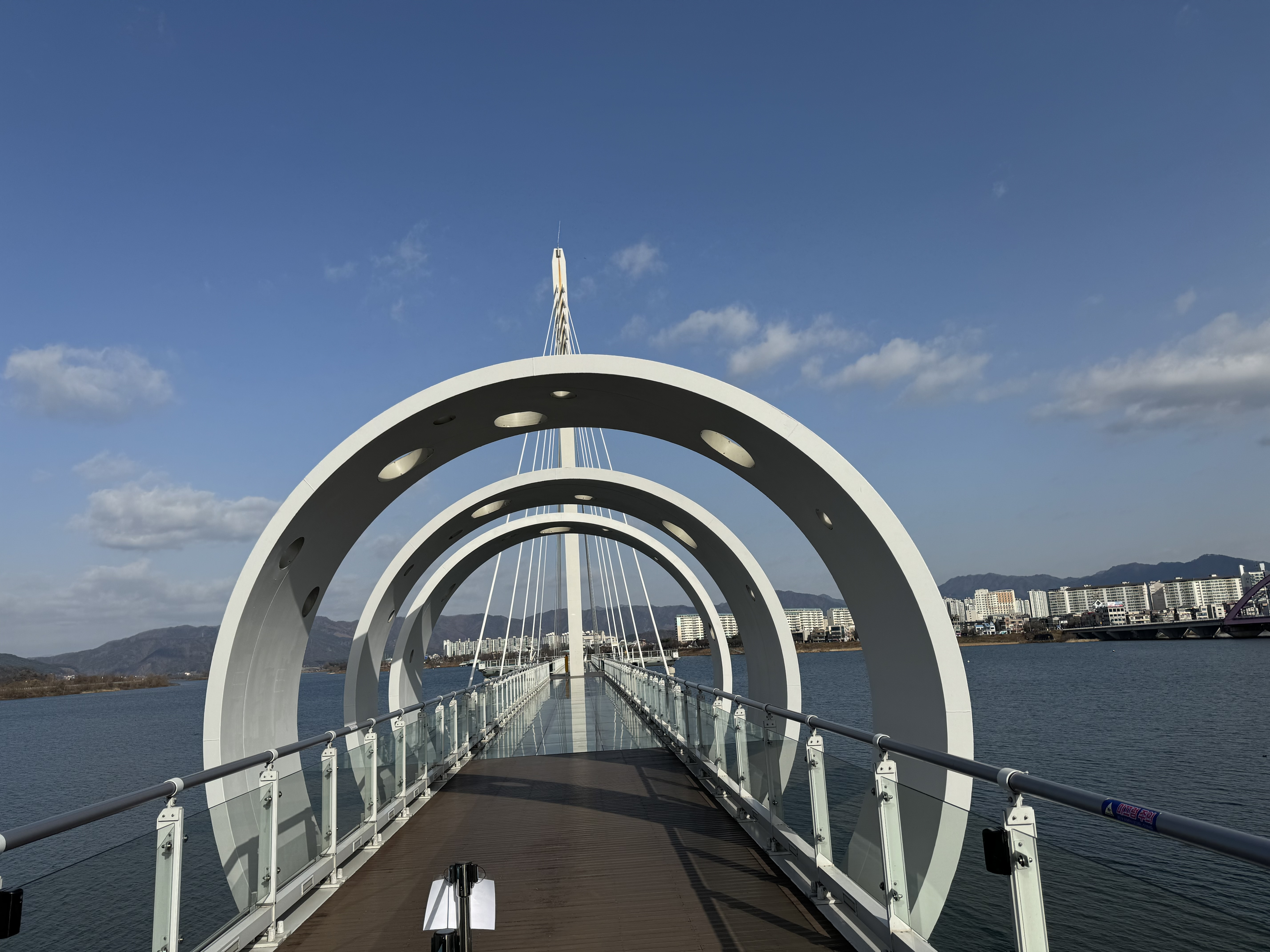
Soyang River Skywalk

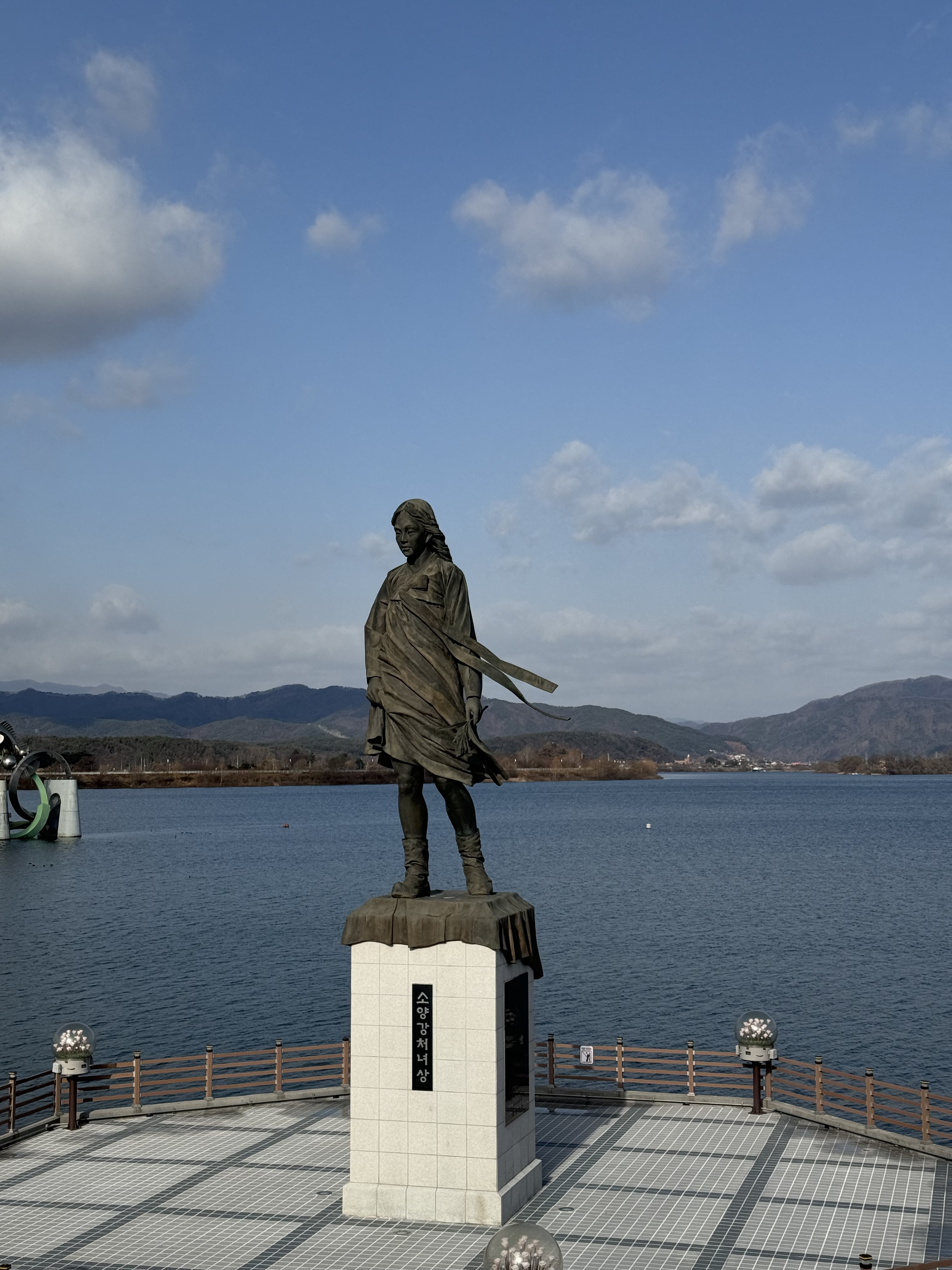
Maiden of Soyang River Statue

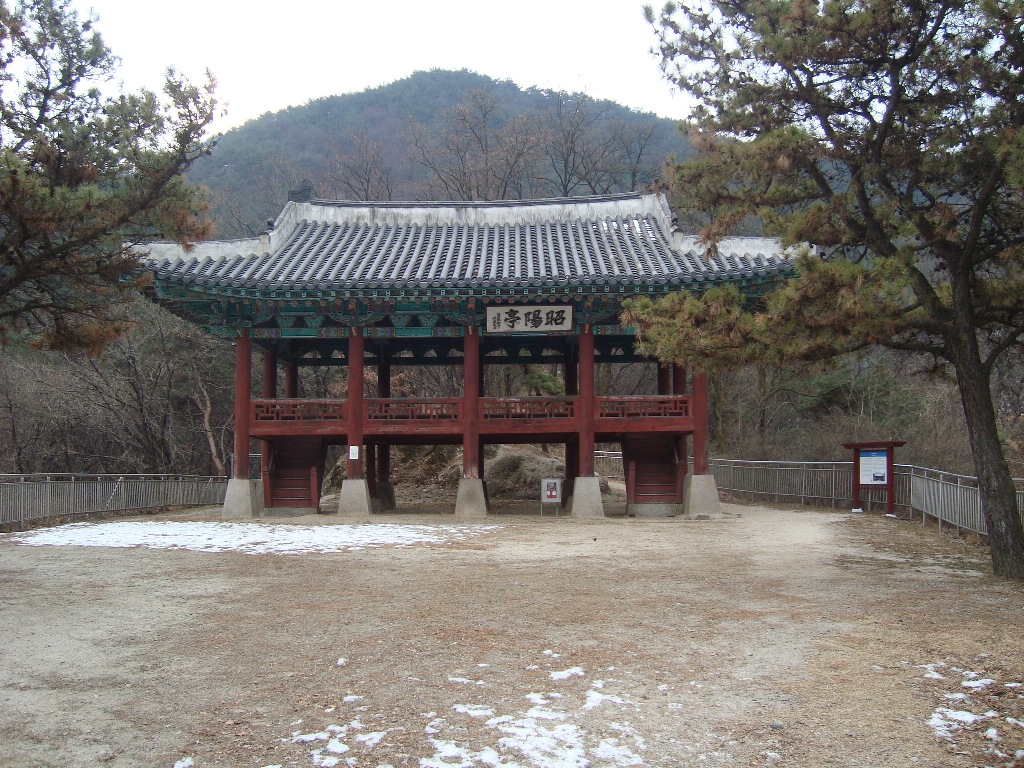
Soyangjeong

== See also ==
- List of rivers of Korea

== External link ==
- Media related to Soyang River at Wikimedia Commons
