= Obongsan (Hwacheon and Chuncheon) =

Mountain in Gangwon Province, South Korea

Coordinates: 38°00′03″N 127°48′22″E

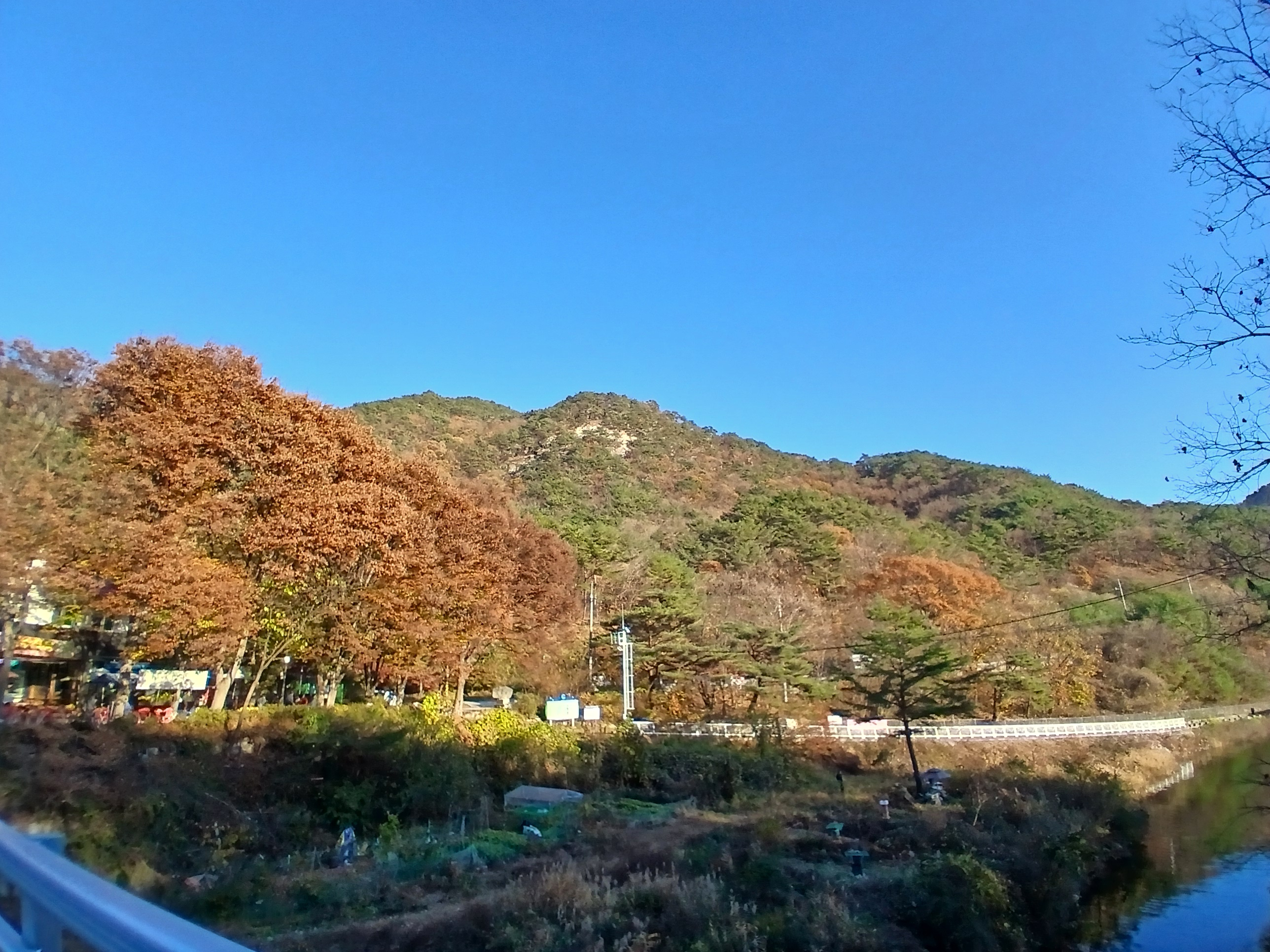

Highest point
- Elevation: 779 m (2,556 ft)

Geography
- Location: South Korea

Korean name
- Hangul: 오봉산
- Hanja: 五峰山
- RR: Obongsan
- MR: Obongsan

Obongsan (Korean: 오봉산) is a mountain in Chuncheon and county of Hwacheon, Gangwon Province, South Korea. It has an elevation of 779 m (2,556 ft).

== Gallery ==
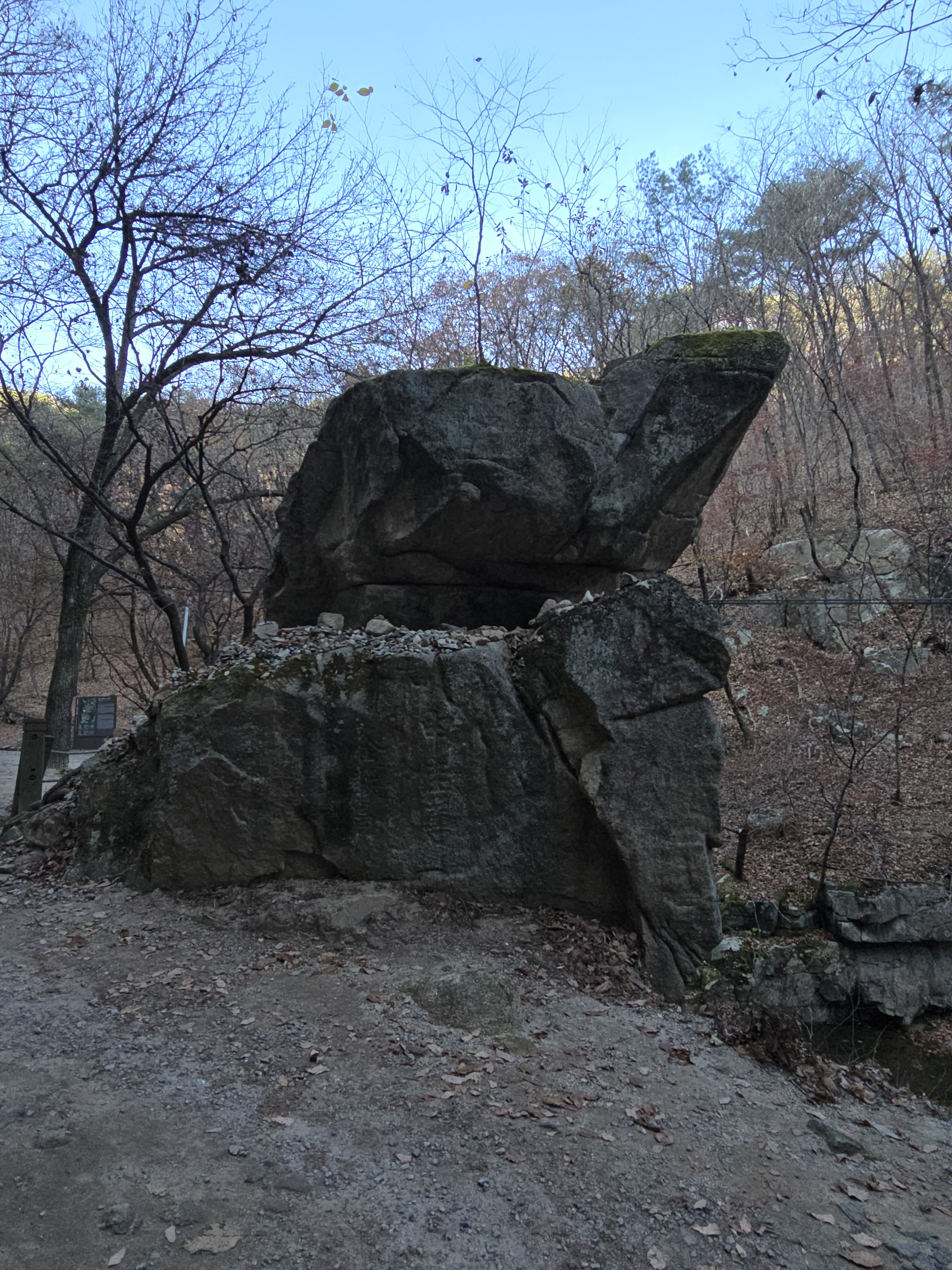
Geobuk Bawi (Turtle Rock)

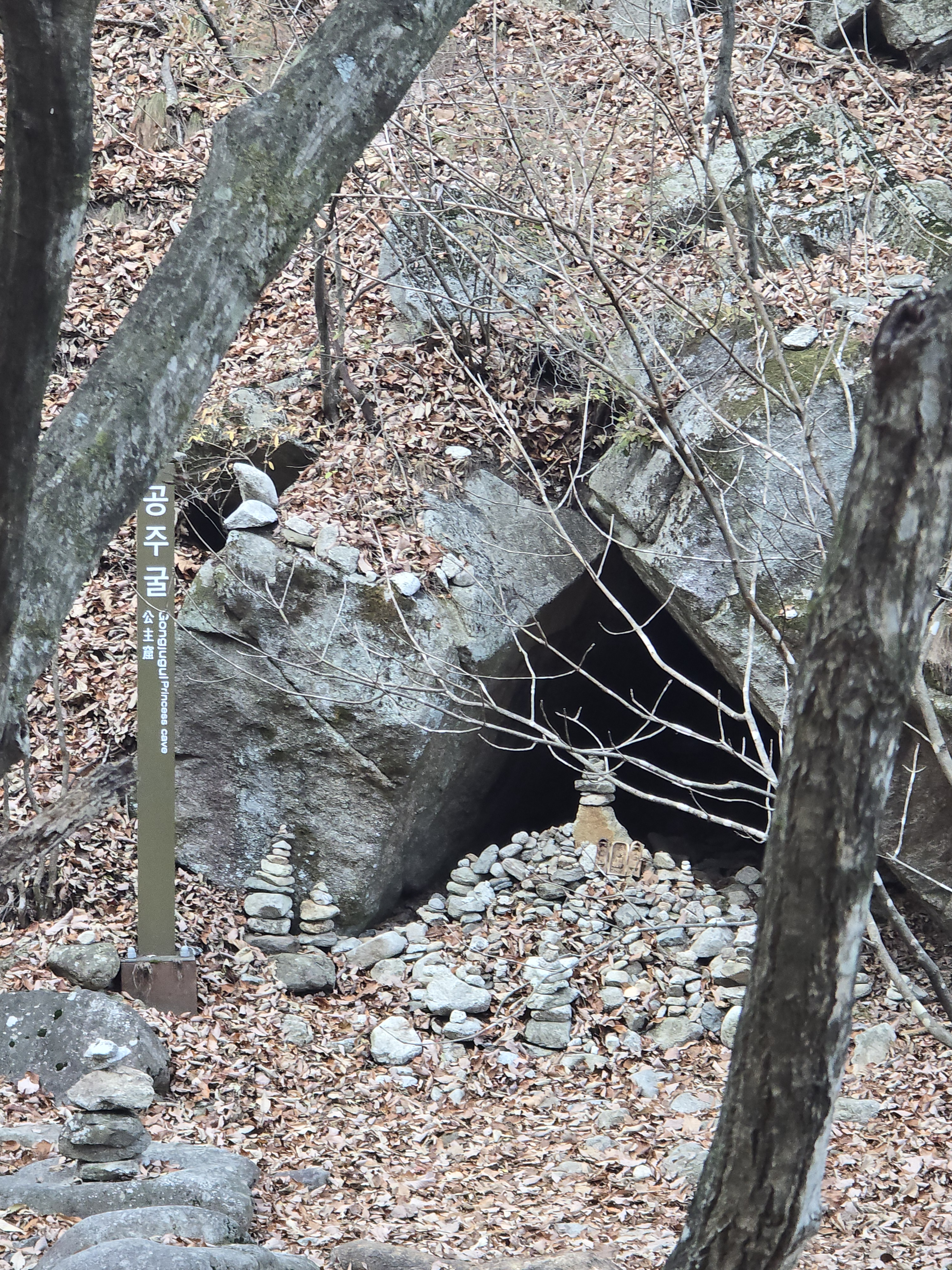
Gongju-gul (Princess Cave)

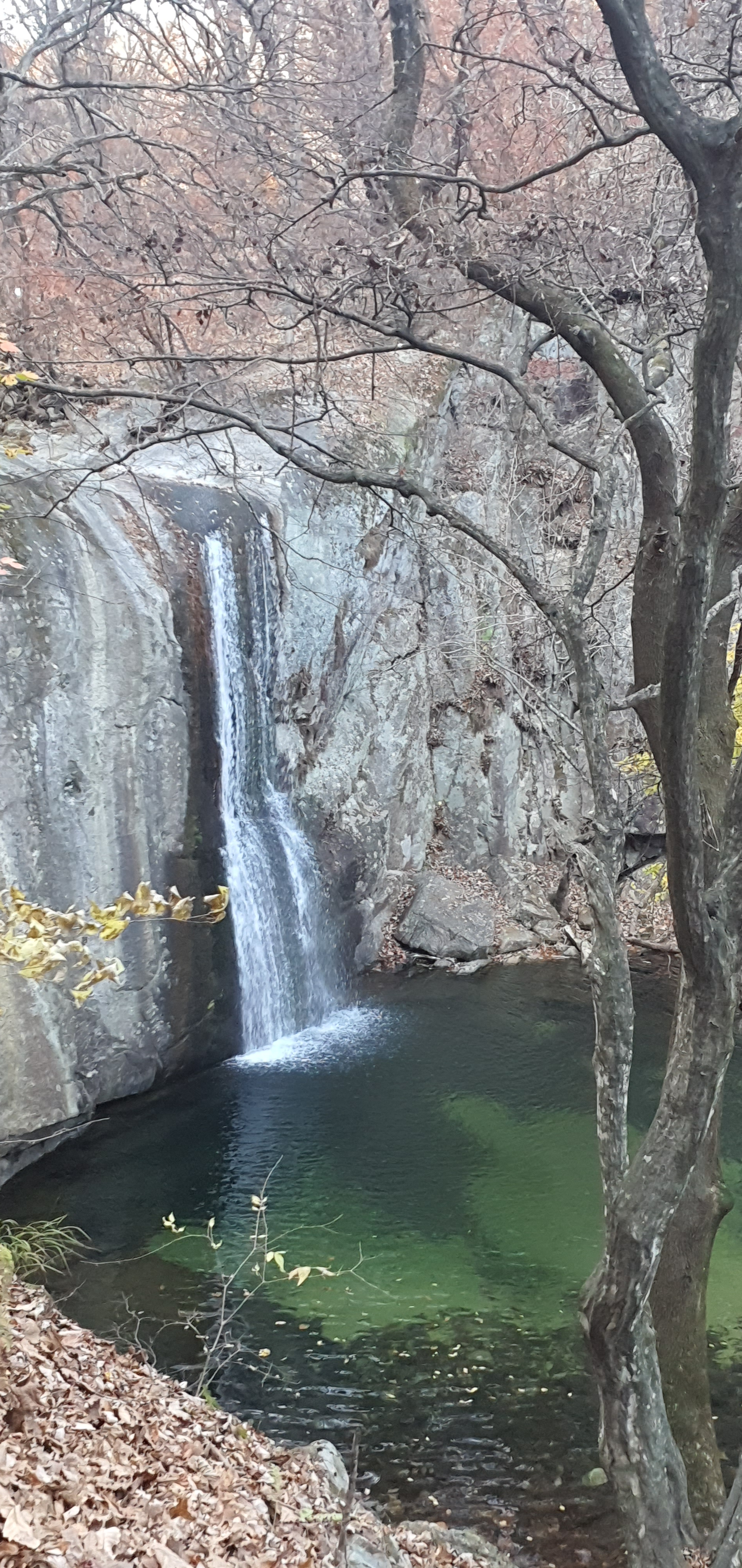
Guseong/Gusong Pokpo (Guseong/Gusong Waterfall)

== See also ==
- List of mountains in Korea

== External likes ==
- * Media related to Obongsan (Hwacheon and Chuncheon) at Wikimedia Commons
