= Chuncheon Puppet Festival =

Puppet festival in South Korea

Chuncheon Puppet Festival 춘천인형극제
- Status: Active
- Genre: Festival
- Begins: May 23, 2025
- Ends: June 1, 2025
- Frequency: Annually
- Locations: Chuncheon, Gangwon Province, South Korea
- Country: South Korea
- Years active: 37
- Founded: September 1989
- Most recent: June 1, 2025
- Previous event: 36rd
- Next event: 38th
- Organiser: Chuncheon Puppet Festival Foundation
- Website: www.cocobau.com
- 37th

- Chuncheon Puppet Festival
- Hangul: 춘천인형극제
- Hanja: 春川人形劇祭
- Revised Romanization: Chuncheon inhyeong geukje
- McCune–Reischauer: Ch'unch'ŏn inhy'ŏng kŭkche

Chuncheon Puppet Festival (Korean: 춘천인형극제) is an annual puppet festival held in Chuncheon, South Korea that includes both Korean and international performers.

The 2022 edition is set to take place at the Chuncheon Puppet Theatre.(춘천인형극장)

The main festival of the 34th Chuncheon Puppet Festival will be held for 10 days from August 26 (Fri) to September 4 (Sun). The Chuncheon Puppet Theatre.(춘천인형극장) and the entire Chuncheon-si area are to be filled with various puppet show festival programs.

More than 50 domestic and international puppet shows and colorful festival programs.

The large-scale parade of the 34th Chuncheon Puppet Festival will visit the audience on August 28 (Sunday).

== See also ==
- List of festivals in South Korea
- List of festivals in Asia
