= Uiam Dam =

Dam in Uiam-ri, Chuncheon, South Korea

Coordinates: 37.8358073°N 127.6761018°E

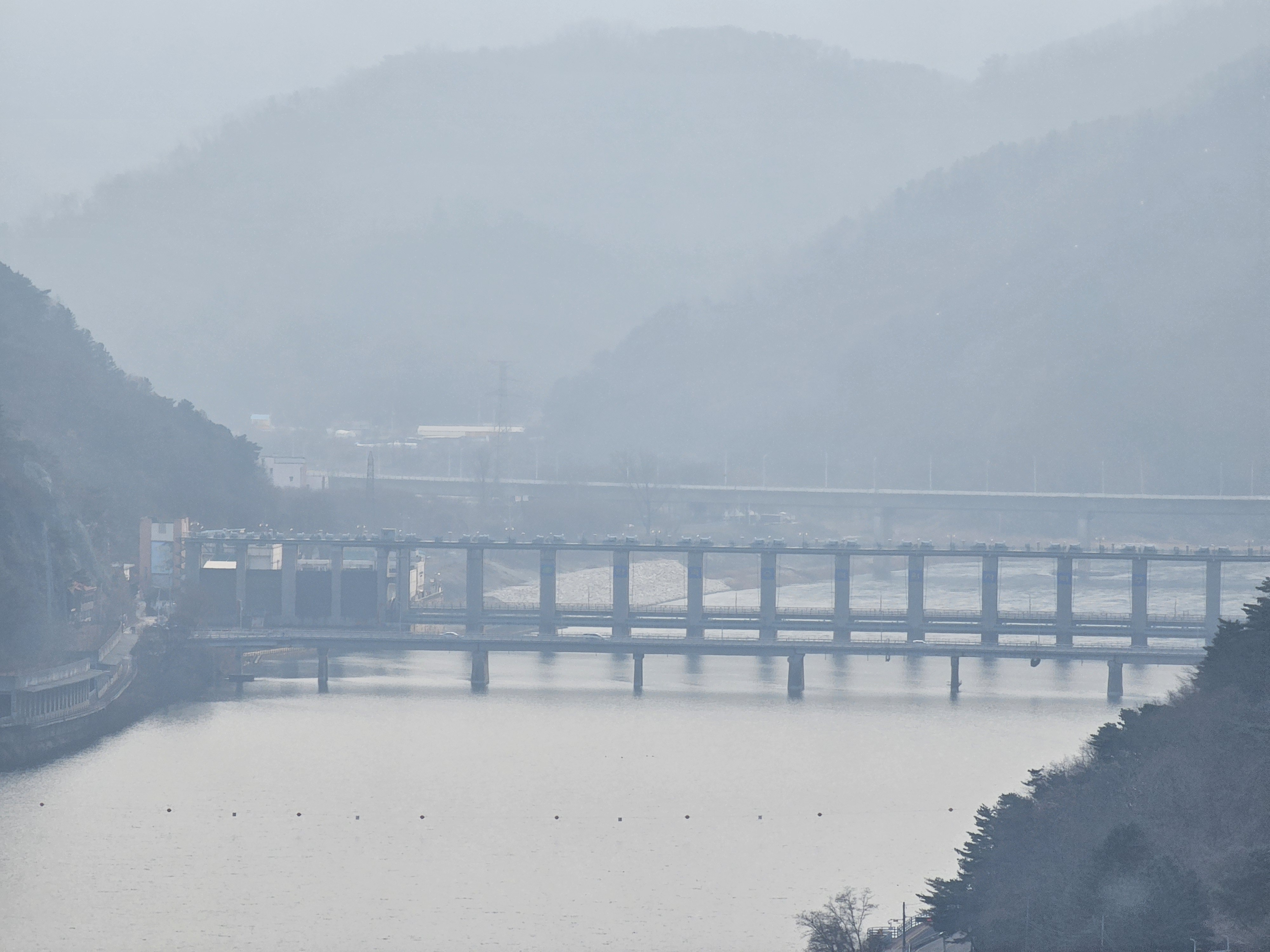
Uiam Dam

Uiam Dam is a dam in Uiam-ri, Shindong-myeon, Chuncheon, South Korea. It dams the Bukhan River. Built in 1967, it is operated by Korea Hydro & Nuclear Power. It is cited as "one of North Han's major hydroelectric projects". The dam's reservoir formed three small islands when constructed.
