= Chuncheon =

City in Gangwon, South Korea

- Municipal city
- Panoramic view of Chuncheon

- Flag

- Location in South Korea
- Coordinates: 37°52′N 127°44′E
- Country: South Korea
- State: Gangwon
- Administrative divisions: 1 eup, 9 myeon, 15 dong

Government
  - Mayor: Yuk Dong-han (육동한)

Area
  - Total: 1,166.8 km^{2} (450.5 sq mi)

Population (February 2026, excluding foreigners)
  - Total: 284,855
  - Density: 244.1/km^{2} (632/sq mi)
- Area code: +82-33-2xx
- Climate: Dwa

Korean name
- Hangul: 춘천시
- Hanja: 春川市
- RR: Chuncheon-si
- MR: Ch'unch'ŏn-si

Chuncheon (Korean: 춘천) is the capital city of Gangwon Province, South Korea. Its population is about 290,000 as of 2026. It has a long history dating back to the Paleolithic Age. Its economy is dominated by the service sector. It produces hydroelectric power through dams such as the Soyang Dam and Uiam Dam.

Chuncheon is known for its distinctive culture such as the local dishes dak-galbi and mak-guksu and the tourist attractions Cheongpyeongsa and Legoland Korea. It is surrounded by mountains and sits at the meeting point of Soyang River and Bukhan River. It also has universities, sports facilities and transportation links to Seoul through the Gyeongchun Line and major expressways. It has also produced notable figures such as footballer Son Heung-min and novelist Gim Yujeong.

== History ==
People have lived in Chuncheon since the Paleolithic Age.

There are records that Maekguk (맥국; 貊國) was founded in Chuncheon but it seems to have been conquered by Goguryeo. In 637, Silla established Usu-ju (우수주; 牛首州) in Chuncheon but whether it was continuously its territory it is not known. After the unification of the Three Kingdoms of Korea, Silla established Suyak-ju (수약주; 首若州) in the region. In the reign of King Gyeongdeok, it was renamed to Sak-ju (삭주; 朔州), and later Gwanghae-ju (광해주; 光海州).

In 940 (23th year of the reign of King Taejo), it was renamed to Chun-ju (춘주; 春州). In mid Goryeo, the region was invaded by Khitans, Mongols and wokou. In 1413 (13th year of the reign of King Taejong), it was renamed to Chuncheon-gun.

In 1896, Chuncheon became the capital city of Gangwon province because of the establishment of the provincial office. During the Battle of Chuncheon in 1950, the 6th Infantry Division of South Korea conducted a defense war for six days in Chuncheon and Hongcheon, delaying II Corps of North Korea's advance to the areas.

In 1995, Chuncheon City was merged with Chuncheon County.

== Industry ==
The service sector occupies a large proportion of Chuncheon's industry. As of 2015, the number of companies by industry is 4,434 in wholesale and retail, 4,890 in accommodation and restaurant, 1,609 in transportation, and 2,383 in public repair and personal service.

Chuncheon has little agricultural land as mountainous areas occupy more than 90% of the total area. Major agricultural products are rice in Sindong-myeon, Nam-myeon, and Sinbuk-eup and radish and cabbage in Sinbuk-eup, Seomyeon, and Sindong-myeon.

There are three hydroelectric powerplants in Chuncheon, Uiam, and Soyang River. Chuncheon Dam, Uiam Dam, and Soyang Dam were built in 1965, 1967, and 1973 respectively. Soyang Dam was the largest rockfill dam in East Asia.

== Population ==
Chuncheon's population has grown steadily over the past half century.

Historical population
Year	Pop.	±%
1965	191,576	—
1970	209,821	+9.5%
1975	204,246	−2.7%
1980	210,985	+3.3%
1985	213,198	+1.0%
1990	217,869	+2.2%
1995	233,016	+7.0%
2000	251,991	+8.1%
2005	256,455	+1.8%
2010	272,739	+6.3%
2015	281,005	+3.0%
2020	284,489	+1.2%
Source: Chuncheon City (1965-2023)

== Administrative divisions ==
Name	Korean text	Area (km^{2})	Population (including foreigners, 2026)
Sinbuk-eup	신북읍	57.2	6,832
Dong-myeon	동면	134.3	18,584
Dongsan-myeon	동산면	80.9	1,331
Sindong-myeon	신동면	48.1	2,532
Dongnae-myeon	동내면	36.6	22,727
Nam-myeon	남면	73.2	1,019
Namsan-myeon	남산면	123.9	3,205
Seo-myeon	서면	141.5	3,538
Sabuk-myeon	사북면	152.4	2,239
Buksan-myeon	북산면	215.0	932
Soyang-dong	소양동	1.2	10,499
Gyo-dong	교동	0.5	3,797
Joun-dong	조운동	0.3	2,414
Yaksamyeong-dong	약사명동	0.5	5,363
Geunhwa-dong	근화동	9.6	8,818
Hupyeong-1-dong	후평1동	2.1	10,761
Hupyeong-2-dong	후평2동	0.7	13,491
Hupyeong-3-dong	후평3동	1.1	18,855
Hyoja-1-dong	효자1동	0.5	3,899
Hyoja-2-dong	효자2동	1.9	12,067
Hyoja-3-dong	효자3동	0.4	4,232
Seoksa-dong	석사동	3.9	32,149
Toegye-dong	퇴계동	4.2	45,299
Gangnam-dong	강남동	14.7	25,231
Sinsau-dong	신사우동	11.6	25,041
Total		1,166.8	290,281

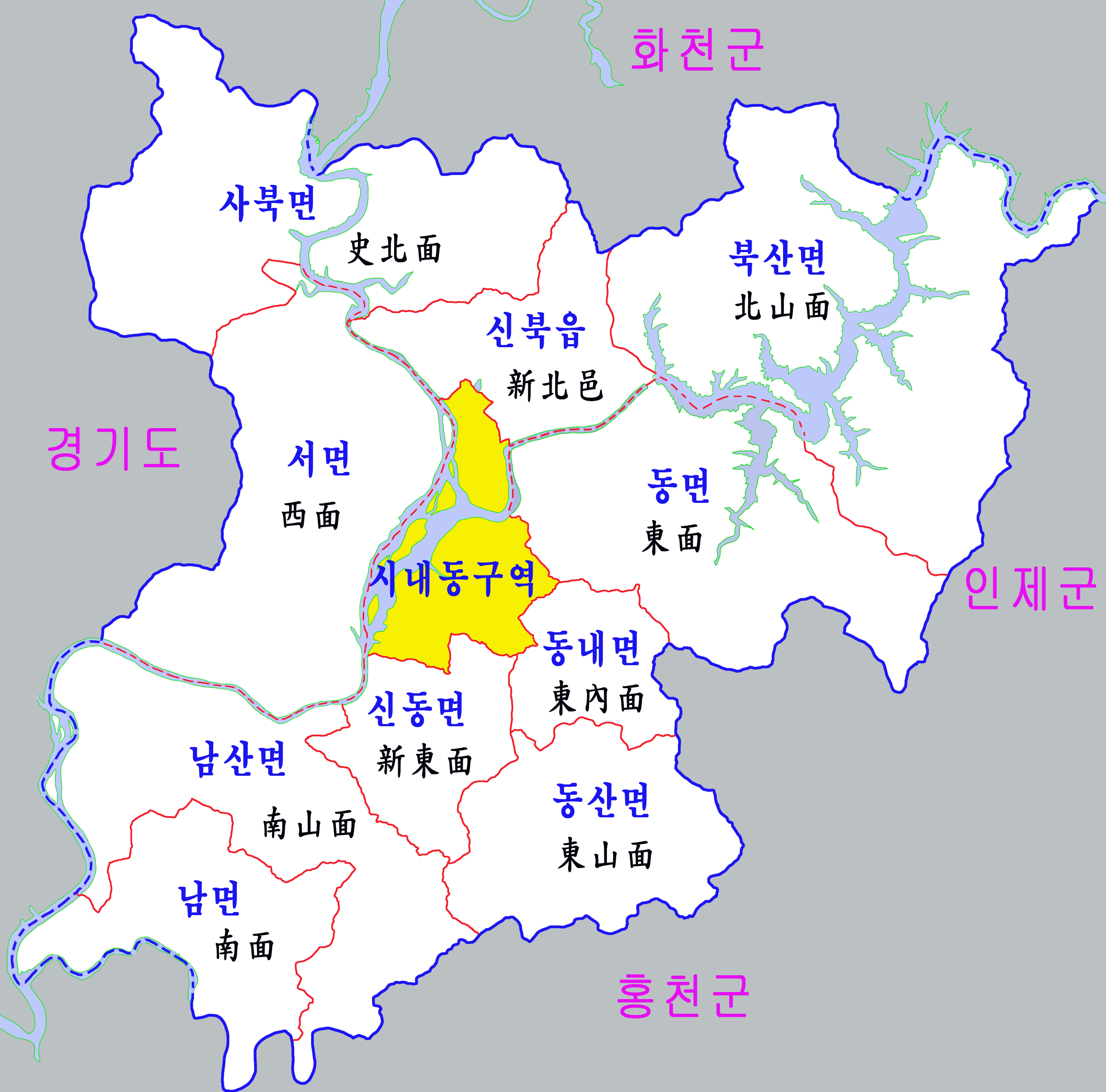
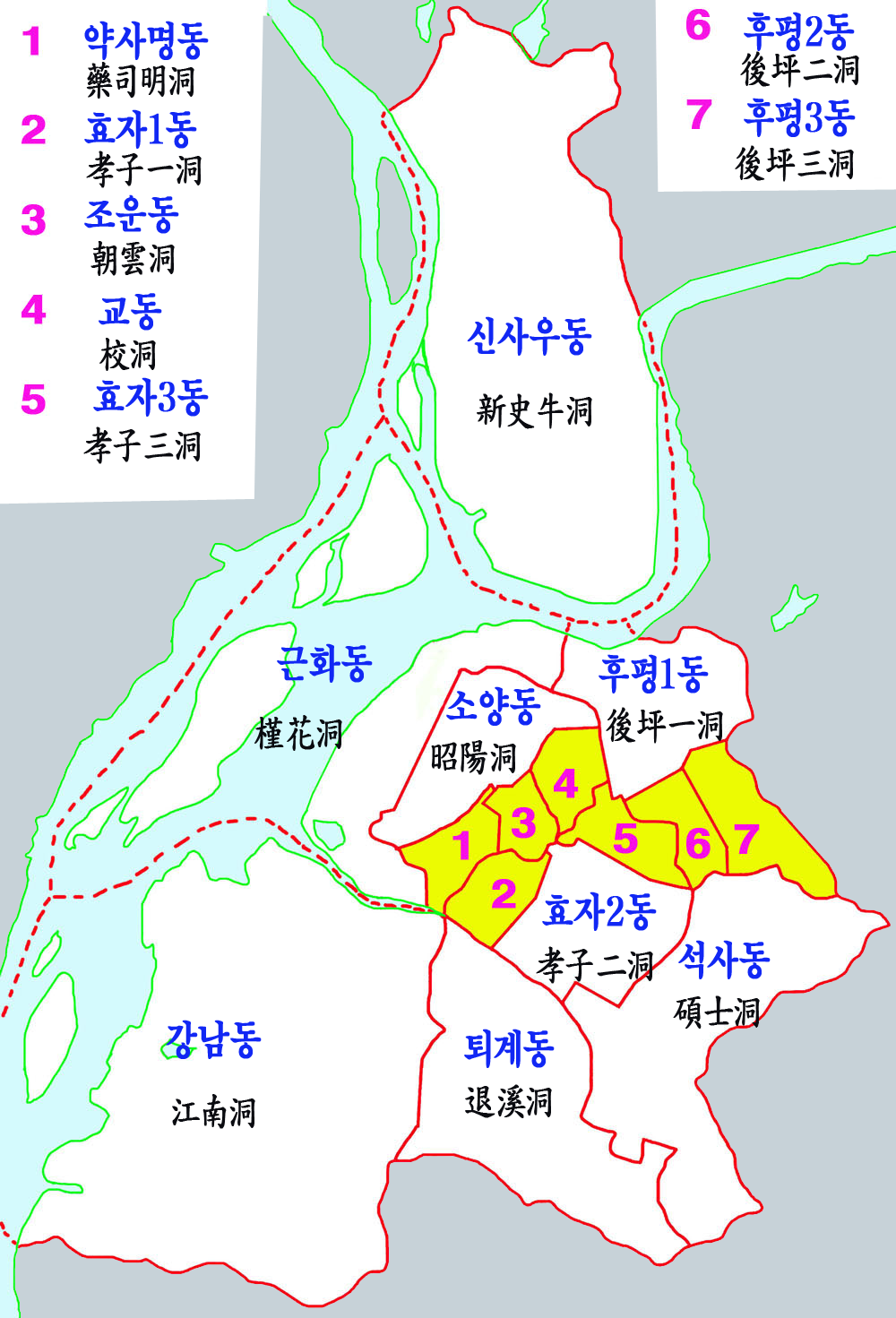

== Education ==
In the Joseon dynasty, Chuncheon Hyanggyo was in Gyo-dong.

As of 2015, there are 42 elementary schools, 18 middle schools, 14 high schools, and 3 special schools. Also, there are 3 junior colleges (Korea Polytechnics III Campus, Hallym Sacred Heart University, and Songgok University), one university of education (Chuncheon National University of Education), two universities (Kangwon National University Chuncheon Campus and Hallym University), and Korea National Open University Gangwon Campus.

== Culture and tourism ==
=== Heritage ===
As of 2026, there are 12 state-designated and 34 province-designated cultural properties in Chuncheon.

Cheongpyeongsa is a Buddhist temple established in 973. Its gate, Hoejeonmun, is designated as Treasure.

=== Food ===
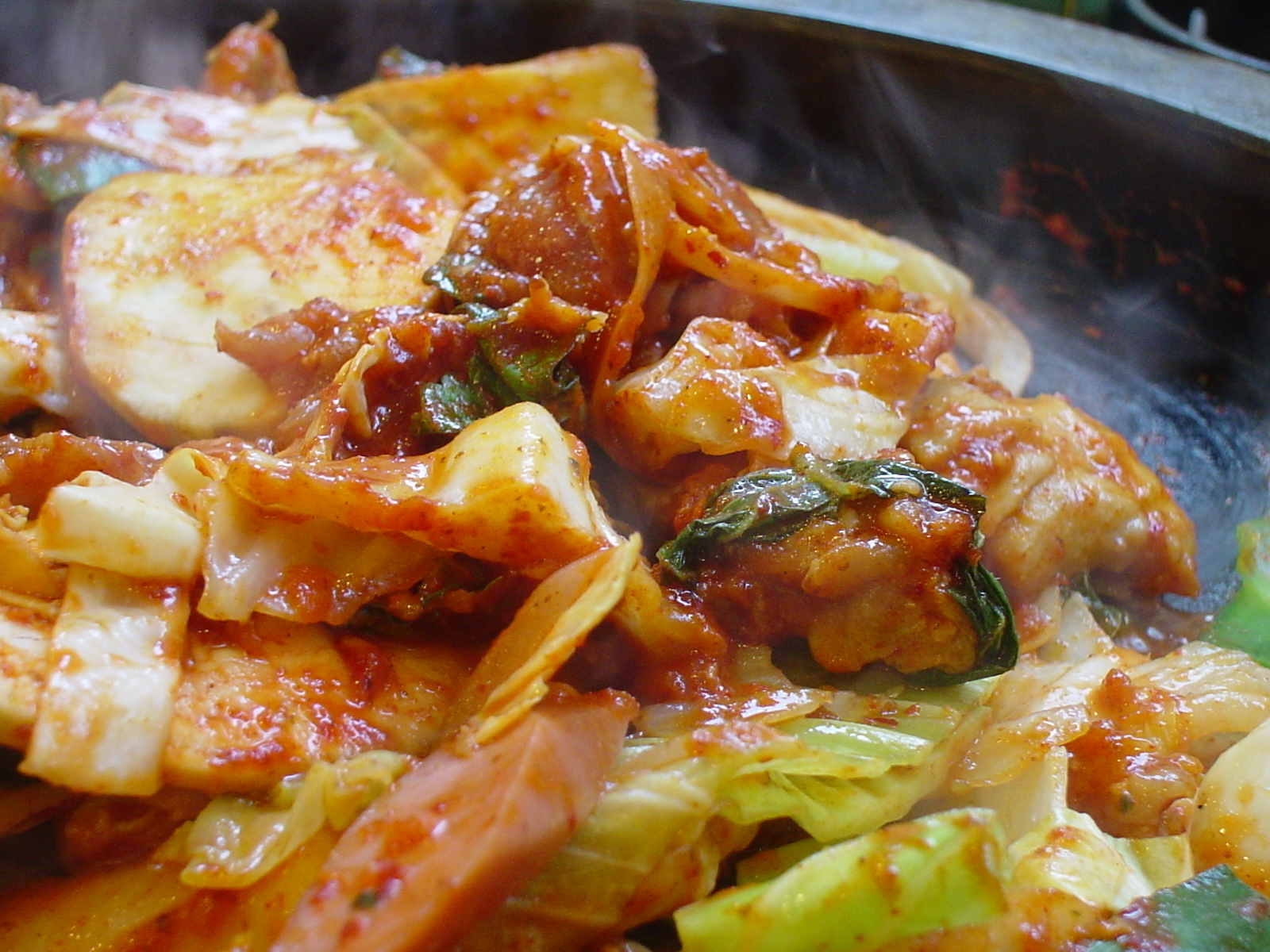
Dak-galbi

Dak-galbi and mak-guksu are regional specialties of Chuncheon. Dakgalbi is made by cutting chicken into thin pieces, marinating it with various sauces, and grilling it. Kim Yeong-seok, an owner of a pork restaurant, is credited with inventing the dish in the 1960s when he used chicken instead when pork ran out. The recipe changed to adding various vegetables such as cabbage and onion and frying them on an iron plate. Subsequently, Myeongdong Dakgalbi Alley was formed in the 1970s. Mak-guksu are dark-colored noodles made from buckwheat. It was originally eaten in the winter as a late-night snack but began to be eaten in all seasons in the 1970s.

=== Festivals ===
In April, Uiam Festival which began in 1985 is held to honor Ryu In-seok who organized an army against Japanese imperialism at the end of the Joseon Dynasty. In May, Chuncheon Mime Festival which began in 1993 is held for the popularization and globalization of mime. It is considered one of the world's three major mime festivals with Mimos Festival of France and London International Mime Festival. Chuncheon International Early Music Festival, which began in 1998, showcases Baroque music.

Starting in June, Chuncheon Theater Festival which began in 1991 showcases comedy plays. In August, visitors can participate in the makguksu eating competition and singing contest at the Chuncheon Dakgalbi & Makguksu Festival, which began in 1996 by Chuncheon City and KBS Chuncheon. In Chuncheon Art Festival which began in 2002, overseas and domestic artists from different genres gather to present new works. Chuncheon Puppet Festival, which began in 1989, is the biggest puppet festival in South Korea.

In September, Soyang River Culture Festival which began in 1966 is held for the succession of local culture and regional harmony. In October, Chuncheon AniTown Festival which began in 1997 is held for the development of the animation industry. In autumn, Gim Yujeong Literature Festival, which began in 2003, is held to honor novelist Gim Yujeong.

=== Museum ===
Chuncheon National Museum opened in 2002 to preserve and exhibit the cultural properties of Gangwon.

=== Resort ===
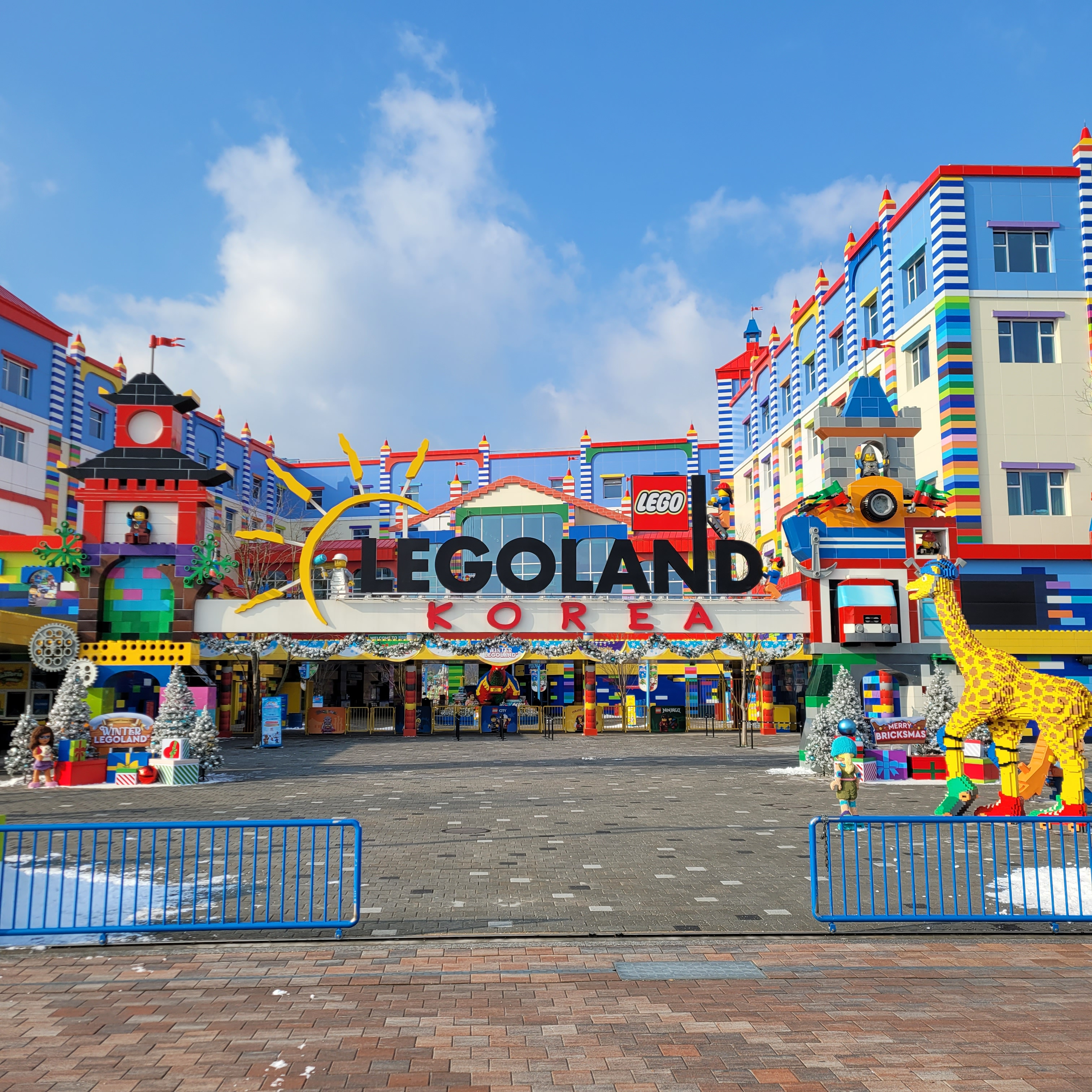
Legoland Korea

Legoland Korea Resort, the 10th Legoland theme park and the 2nd largest in the world, opened in 2022.

=== In media ===
Because of the success of the 2002 drama Winter Sonata in Japan, Namiseom and Myeongdong were popular destinations for Japanese tourists.

== Sports ==
Chuncheon Songam Sports Town began operating in 2009. It has a sports complex that accommodates 25,000 people, an 8,500-seat baseball stadium, indoor and outdoor tennis courts, a Korean archery field, an ice rink and leisure facilities.

Gangchon is a popular place to ski.

=== Sports Clubs ===
Chuncheon FC, member of the K3 League, is a semi-professional football team. The club was founded in February 2010 with its home at the Chuncheon Stadium.

High1 was an ice hockey team based in Chuncheon. The club was a member of the Asia League Ice Hockey between 2005 and 2019. Founded in 2004, it was dissolved in 2023.

=== Sports events ===
There are three marathons in Chuncheon. Chuncheon National Inline Marathon is held to popularize inline skating. Chosun Ilbo Chuncheon Marathon began in 1946 by Sohn Kee-chung and other athletes to train athletes. Chuncheon Hoban Marathon is held to honor Ham Gi-yong who won the 1950 Boston Marathon.

In Chuncheon Korea Open International Taekwondo Championships, athletes compete for championship in taekwondo.

National MTB Gangchon Challenger Competition is a mountain bike racing festival.

== Transportation ==
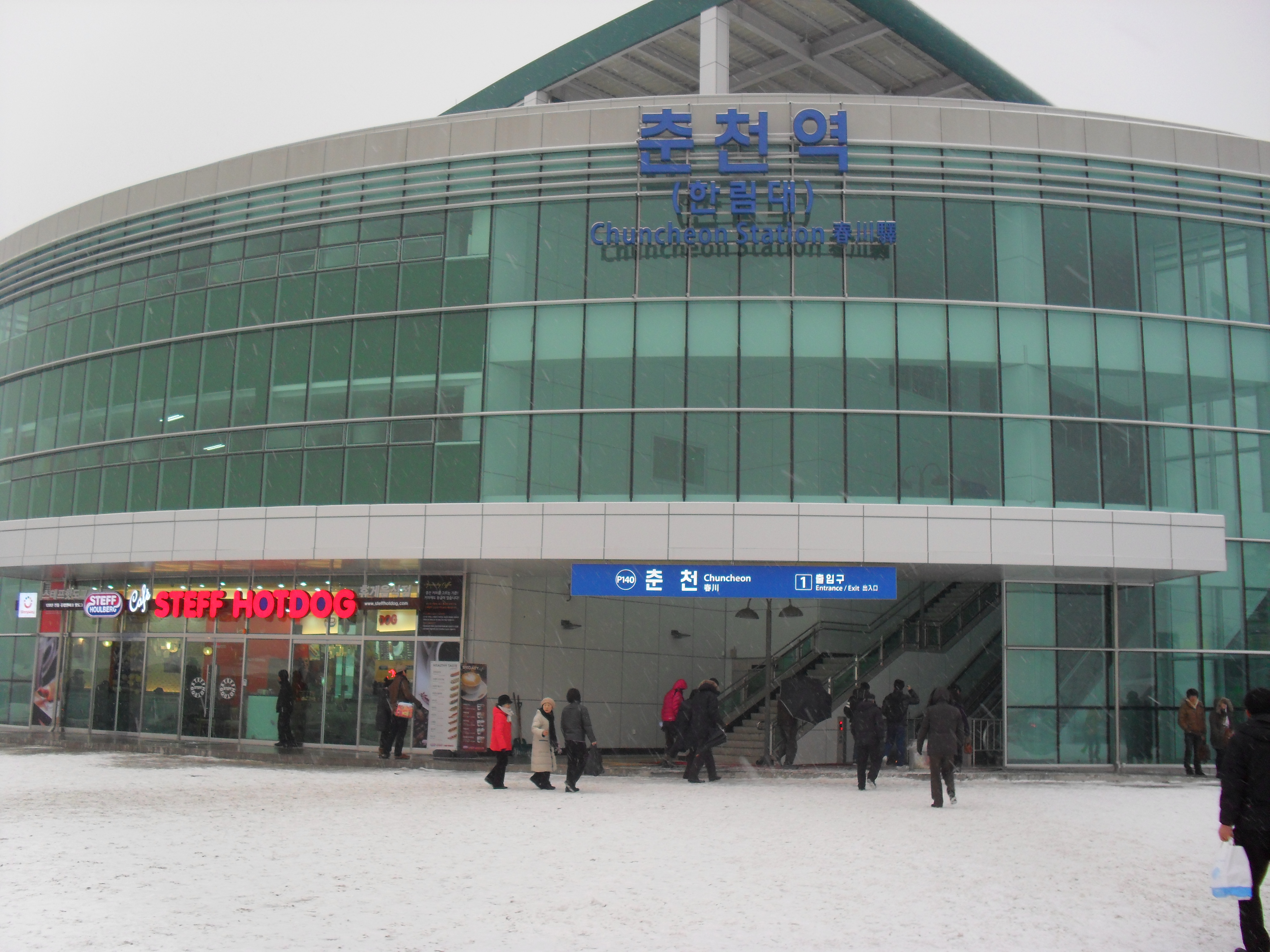
Chuncheon station

Gyeongchun Line is a double-track railway that connects Mangu station in Seoul and Chuncheon. Its stations located in Chuncheon are Baegyang-ri station, Gimyujeong station, Namchuncheon station, and Chuncheon station (terminus).

Chuncheon is a transportation hub as National Route 5 and National Route 46 go through the region. It is also the northern terminus of publicly funded Jungang Expressway and the main destination of the privately run Seoul-Chuncheon Expressway. In 2017, the expressway was extended to Yangyang and thus renamed to Seoul-Yangyang Expressway.

Chuncheon Intercity Bus Terminal operates 41 routes as of 2025.

There are also passenger boats in Soyang Lake which connects to Cheongpyeongsa and Yanggu County.

== Nature ==
Chuncheon is a basin with Obong Mountain to the north, Samak Mountain in the west, Bonghwa mountain in the southwest, and Daeryong Mountain in the southeast.

Soyang River from the northeast and Bukhan River from the northwest join in the basin and flow southward. River islands such as Namiseom in Cheongpyeong Lake and Wido, Jungdo, and Bungeoseom in Uiam Lake are developed.

== Climate ==
Chuncheon has a monsoon-influenced humid continental climate (Köppen: Dwa) with cold, dry winters and hot, rainy summers. The lowest measured temperature was −27.9 °C (−18 °F) (6 February 1969), and the highest was 39.5 °C (103 °F) (1 August 2018). The annual precipitation is an average of 1347.3 mm.

Climate data for Chuncheon (1991–2020 normals, extremes 1966–present)
Month	Jan	Feb	Mar	Apr	May	Jun	Jul	Aug	Sep	Oct	Nov	Dec	Year
Record high °C (°F)	12.7 (54.9)	19.9 (67.8)	23.5 (74.3)	32.0 (89.6)	34.0 (93.2)	36.4 (97.5)	37.2 (99.0)	39.5 (103.1)	34.7 (94.5)	28.5 (83.3)	24.8 (76.6)	16.6 (61.9)	39.5 (103.1)
Mean daily maximum °C (°F)	1.9 (35.4)	5.4 (41.7)	11.6 (52.9)	18.9 (66.0)	24.3 (75.7)	28.1 (82.6)	29.3 (84.7)	29.9 (85.8)	25.6 (78.1)	19.6 (67.3)	11.2 (52.2)	3.5 (38.3)	17.4 (63.3)
Daily mean °C (°F)	−4.1 (24.6)	−1.0 (30.2)	5.0 (41.0)	11.7 (53.1)	17.6 (63.7)	22.2 (72.0)	24.9 (76.8)	25.0 (77.0)	19.8 (67.6)	12.7 (54.9)	5.3 (41.5)	−2.0 (28.4)	11.4 (52.5)
Mean daily minimum °C (°F)	−9.3 (15.3)	−6.7 (19.9)	−1.1 (30.0)	4.7 (40.5)	11.3 (52.3)	17.0 (62.6)	21.3 (70.3)	21.3 (70.3)	15.3 (59.5)	7.5 (45.5)	0.4 (32.7)	−6.6 (20.1)	6.3 (43.3)
Record low °C (°F)	−25.6 (−14.1)	−27.9 (−18.2)	−16.2 (2.8)	−6.4 (20.5)	1.6 (34.9)	5.6 (42.1)	11.7 (53.1)	11.3 (52.3)	1.9 (35.4)	−5.4 (22.3)	−15.8 (3.6)	−21.7 (−7.1)	−27.9 (−18.2)
Average precipitation mm (inches)	18.6 (0.73)	27.6 (1.09)	33.5 (1.32)	71.5 (2.81)	99.4 (3.91)	122.9 (4.84)	398.2 (15.68)	319.9 (12.59)	128.1 (5.04)	49.3 (1.94)	48.3 (1.90)	24.2 (0.95)	1,341.5 (52.81)
Average precipitation days (≥ 0.1 mm)	6.2	5.9	7.3	8.3	9.1	9.9	15.6	14.0	8.3	6.0	8.0	7.5	106.1
Average snowy days	8.8	6.3	3.9	0.2	0.0	0.0	0.0	0.0	0.0	0.0	1.8	6.7	27.7
Average relative humidity (%)	68.0	63.2	60.6	58.8	65.0	70.6	80.0	80.5	78.2	76.2	73.3	71.5	70.5
Mean monthly sunshine hours	170.0	174.3	199.9	210.1	227.5	205.0	144.2	166.3	173.3	178.9	141.8	148.4	2,139.7
Percentage possible sunshine	54.1	56.6	53.3	54.5	50.2	45.3	32.1	40.1	46.6	50.0	46.4	50.0	47.7
Source: Korea Meteorological Administration (snow and percent sunshine 1981–2010)

== Notable people ==
- Son Heung-min: professional footballer
- Hwang Hee-chan: professional footballer
- Hur Jae: basketball coach and former basketball player
- Kim Jun-hyun: comedian
- Park Bo-ram: singer-songwriter
- Seunghee: singer and actress, member of Oh My Girl
- Yebin: singer-songwriter, former member of DIA and Uni.T
- Changjo: singer-songwriter and actor, member of Teen Top
- Gim Yu-jeong: novelist
- Jin Jong-oh: Shooting sports athlete who competed at the 2004, 2008, 2012 and 2016 Summer Olympics
- Han Seung-soo: 39th prime minister of Rep. of Korea, tenure 2008–2009
- Minji: singer, member of NewJeans

== Sister cities ==
City	State	Country
Dongdaemun District, Gangnam District	Seoul	South Korea
Goseong County	Gangwon Province	South Korea
Ansan	Gyeonggi Province	South Korea
Nam District	Gwangju	South Korea
Goheung County	South Jeolla Province	South Korea
Goseong County	South Gyeongsang Province	South Korea
Hōfu	Yamaguchi Prefecture	Japan
Kakamigahara	Gifu Prefecture	Japan
Baoding	Hebei	China
Hangzhou	Zhejiang	China
Dalian, Shenyang	Liaoning	China
Changzhou	Jiangsu	China
Nanyang	Henan	China
Da Lat	Lam Dong	Vietnam
Parma	Emilia-Romagna	Italy
Vejle	Southern Denmark	Denmark
Medellín	Antioquia Department	Colombia
Addis Ababa		Ethiopia

In March 2005, Chuncheon sent letters of protest to its sister cities in Japan (Kakamigahara, Higashichikuma, and Hofu) and indefinitely postponed culture exchange events in protest of the enactment of "Day of Takeshima" in Shimane Prefecture. In October 2005, culture exchange events were resumed.

== Gallery ==
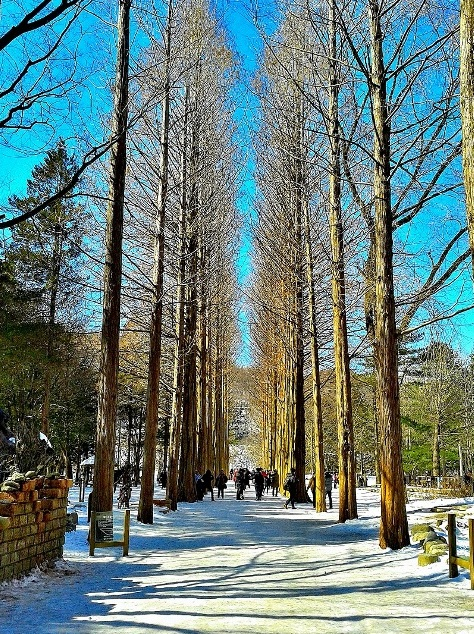
Namiseom

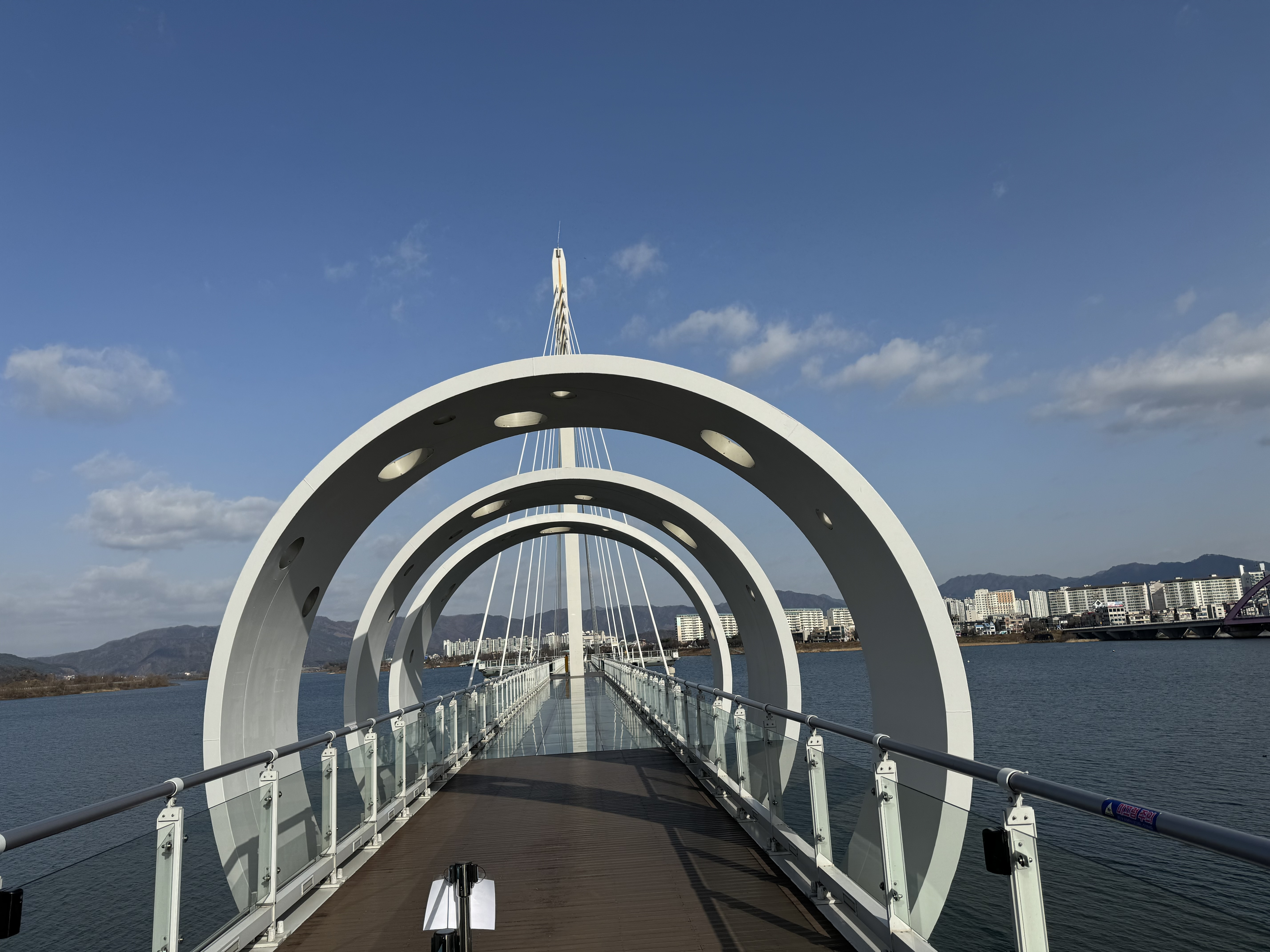
Soyang River Skywalk

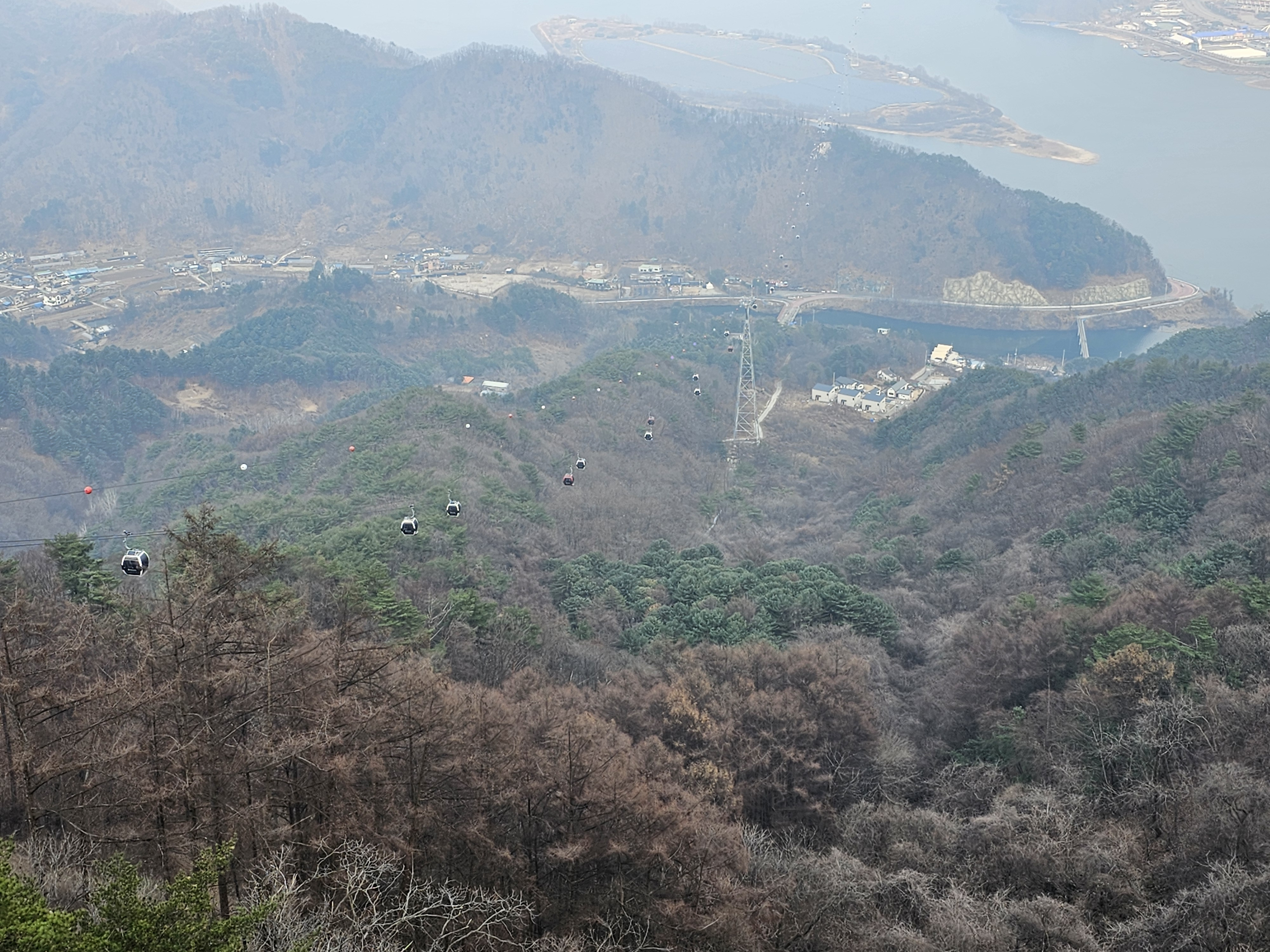
Samak Mountain

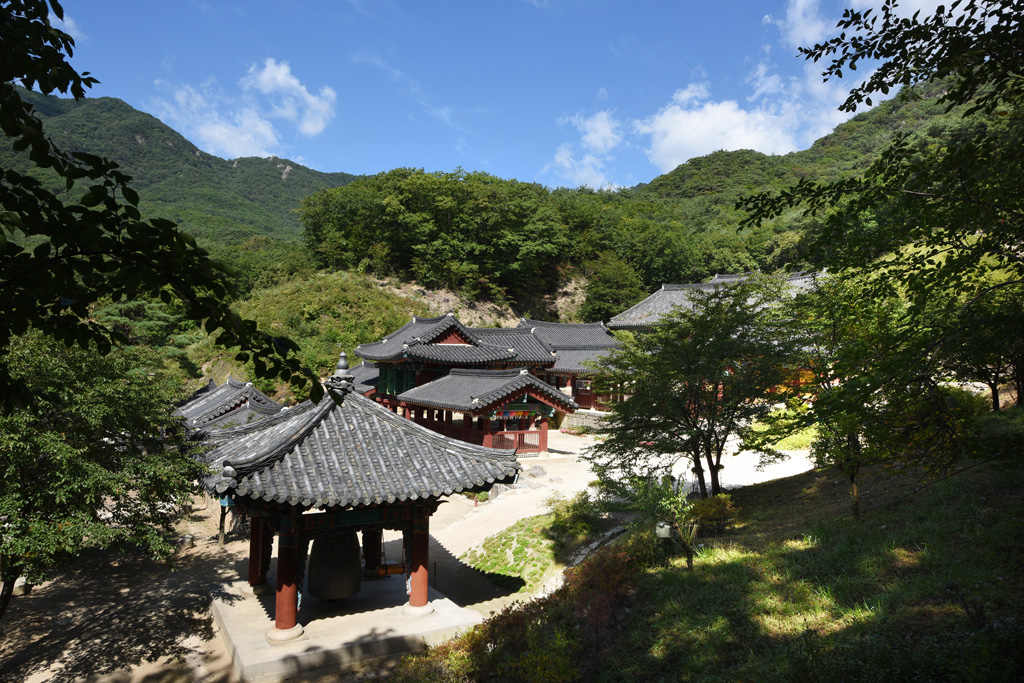
Cheongpyeongsa

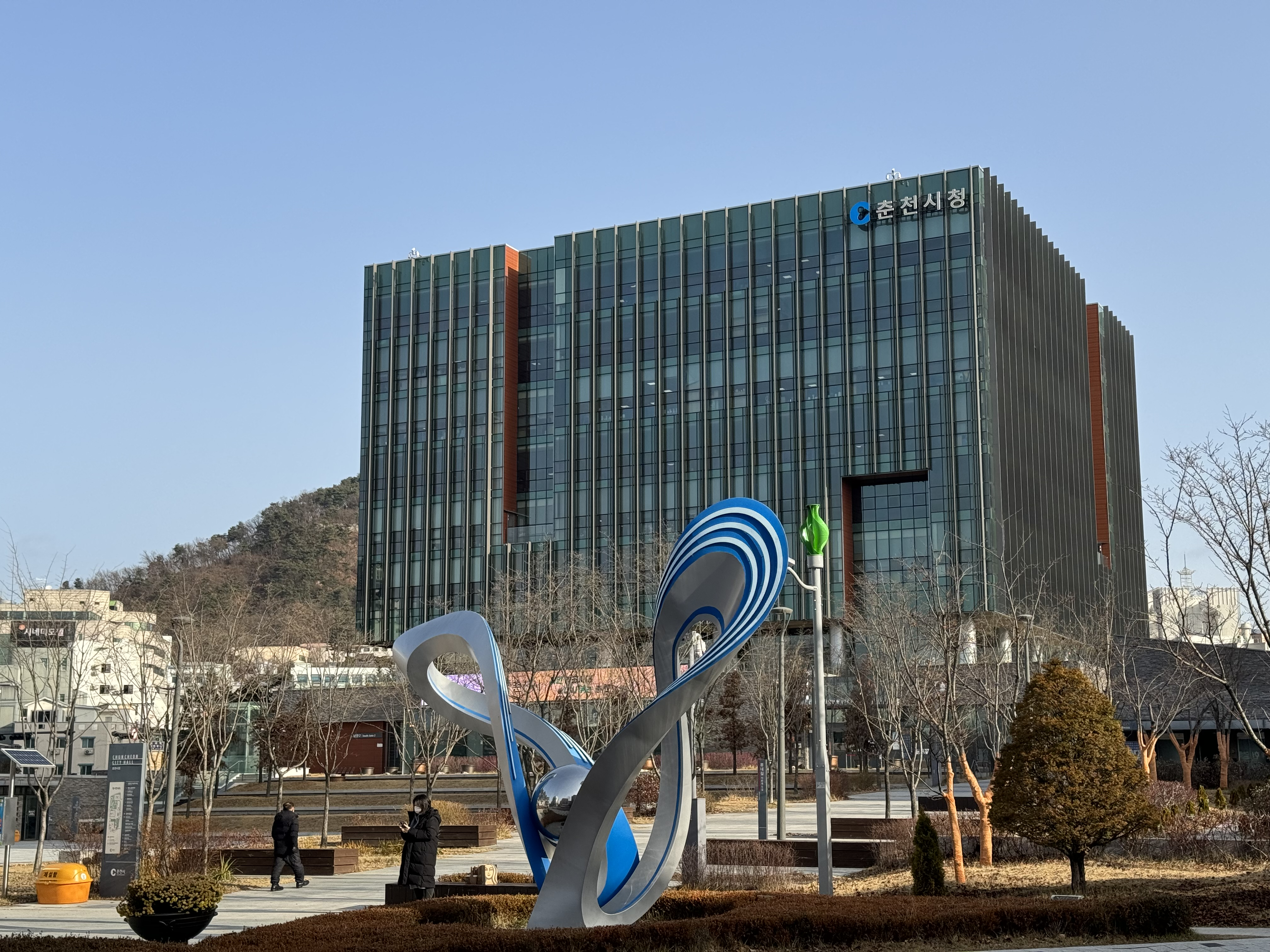
Chuncheon City Hall

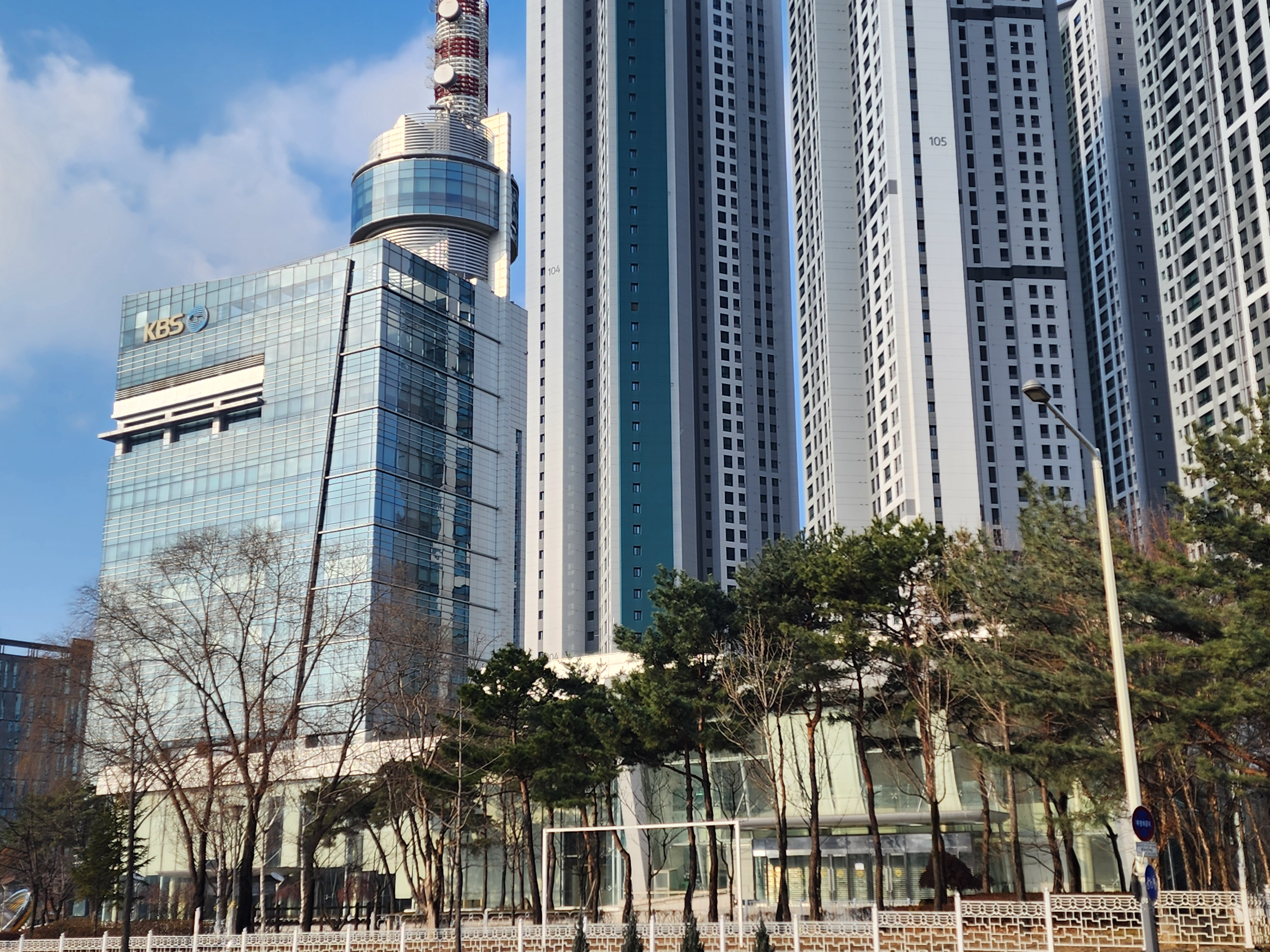
KBS Chuncheon

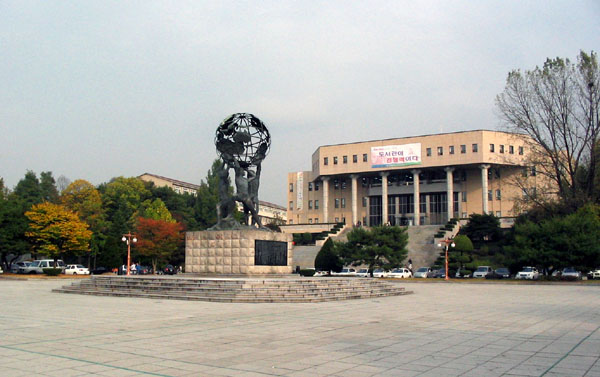
Kangwon National University

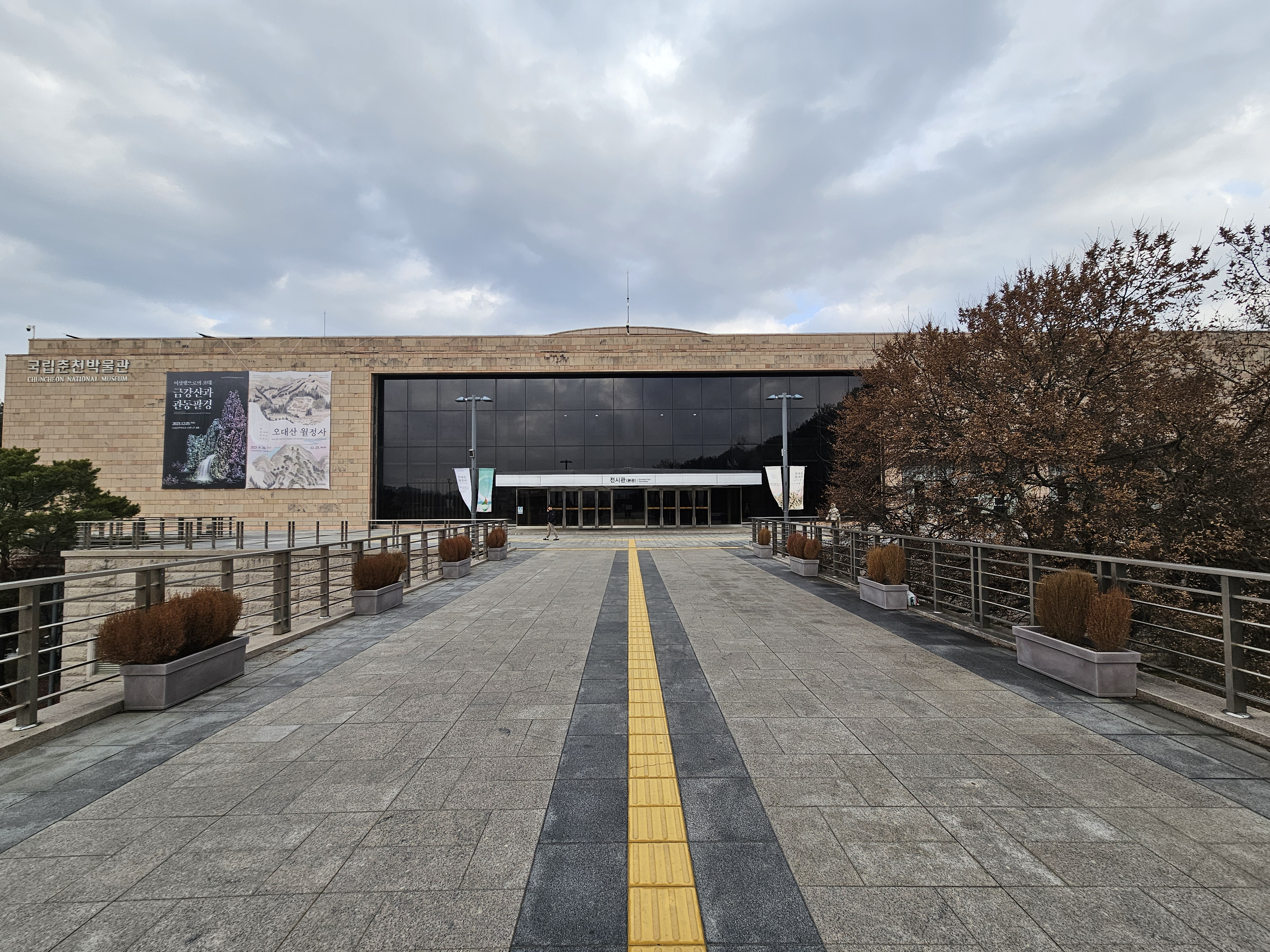
Chuncheon National Museum

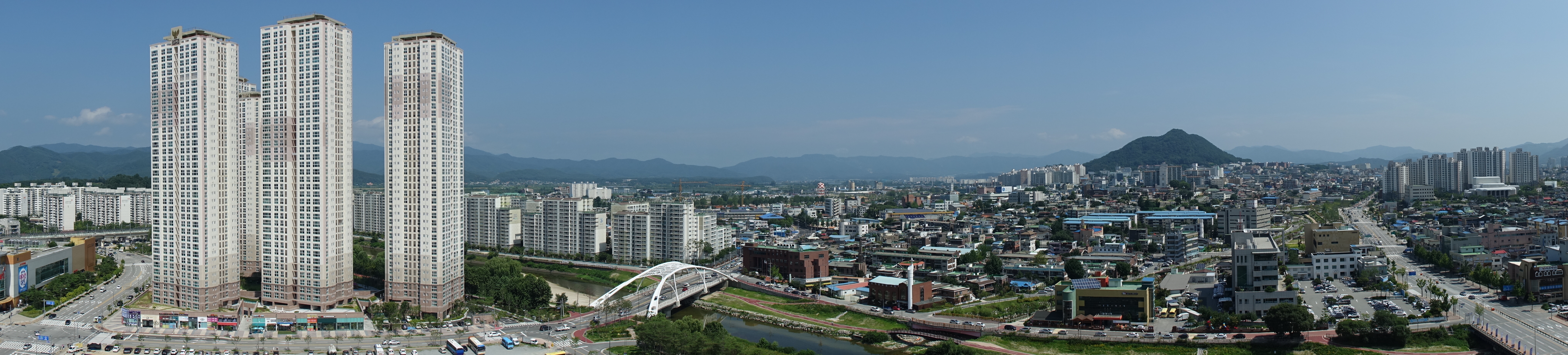
Panoramic view of Chuncheon

== See also ==
- List of cities in South Korea
