= Soyang Dam =

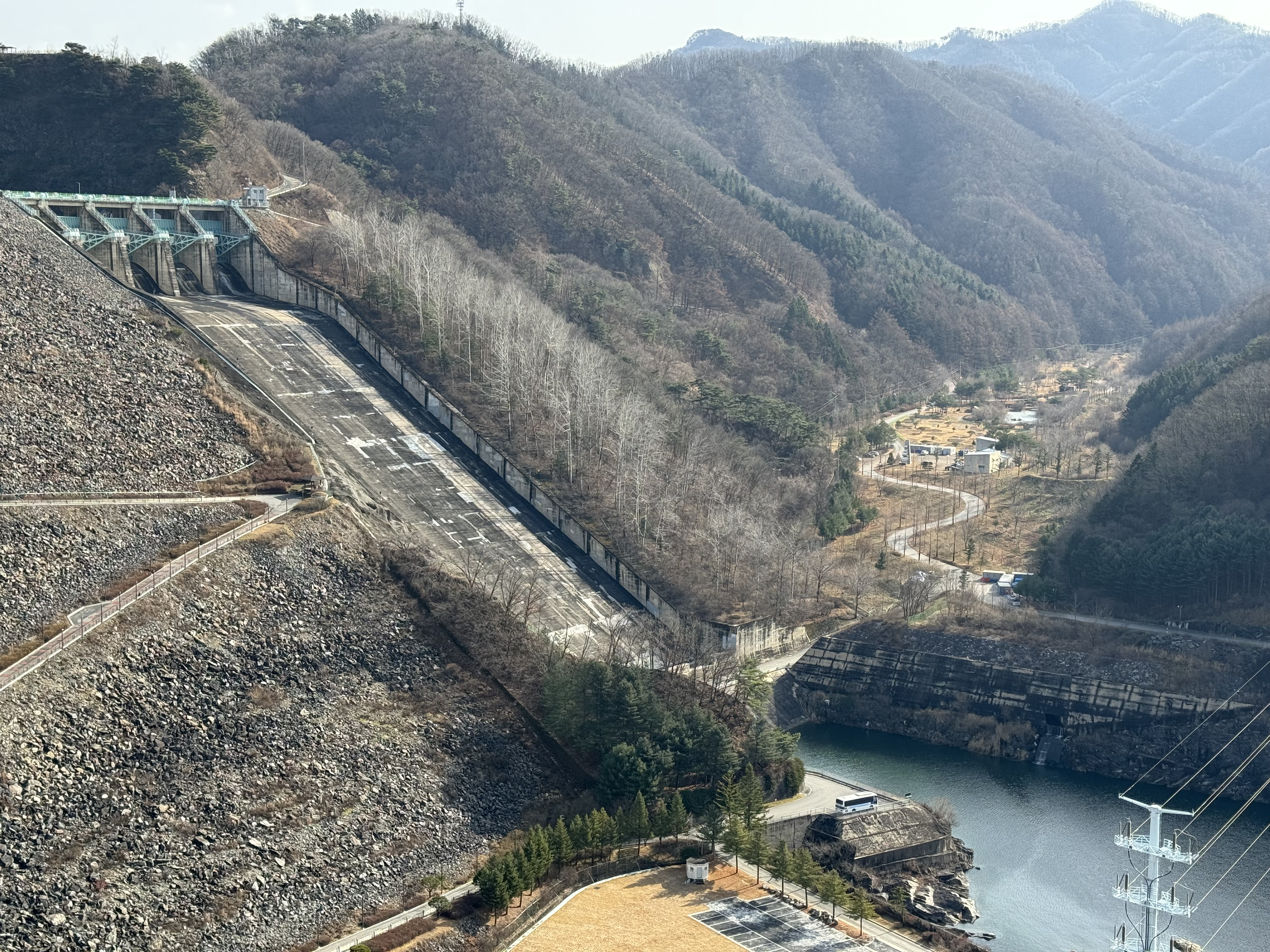

- Location within South Korea
- Country: South Korea
- Location: Chuncheon
- Coordinates: 37°56′44″N 127°48′52″E
- Status: Operational
- Construction began: 1967
- Opening date: 1973
- Owner: Korea Water Resources Corporation

Dam and spillways
- Type of dam: Embankment
- Impounds: Soyang River
- Height: 123 m (404 ft)
- Length: 530 m (1,739 ft)
- Dam volume: 9,600,000 m^{3} (12,556,326 cu yd)
- Spillway type: Controlled-chute
- Spillway capacity: 5,500 m^{3}/s (194,231 cu ft/s)

Reservoir
- Total capacity: 2,900,000,000 m^{3} (2,351,068 acre⋅ft)
- Active capacity: 1,900,000,000 m^{3} (1,540,355 acre⋅ft)

Power Station
- Turbines: 3 x Francis-type
- Installed capacity: 200 MW

The Soyang Dam, also referred to as the Soyanggang Dam, is an embankment dam on the Soyang River, 10 km (6 mi) northeast of Chuncheon in Gangwon-do Province, South Korea. The purpose of the dam is flood control, water supply and hydroelectric power generation. Construction on the dam began on April 15, 1967, and was completed on October 15, 1973. The 123 m (404 ft) tall dam withholds a reservoir of 2,900,000,000 m^{3} (2,351,068 acre⋅ft) and supplies water to a 200 MW power station.

== See also ==
- List of power stations in South Korea
