= Central Korean deciduous forests =

Ecoregion in Korea

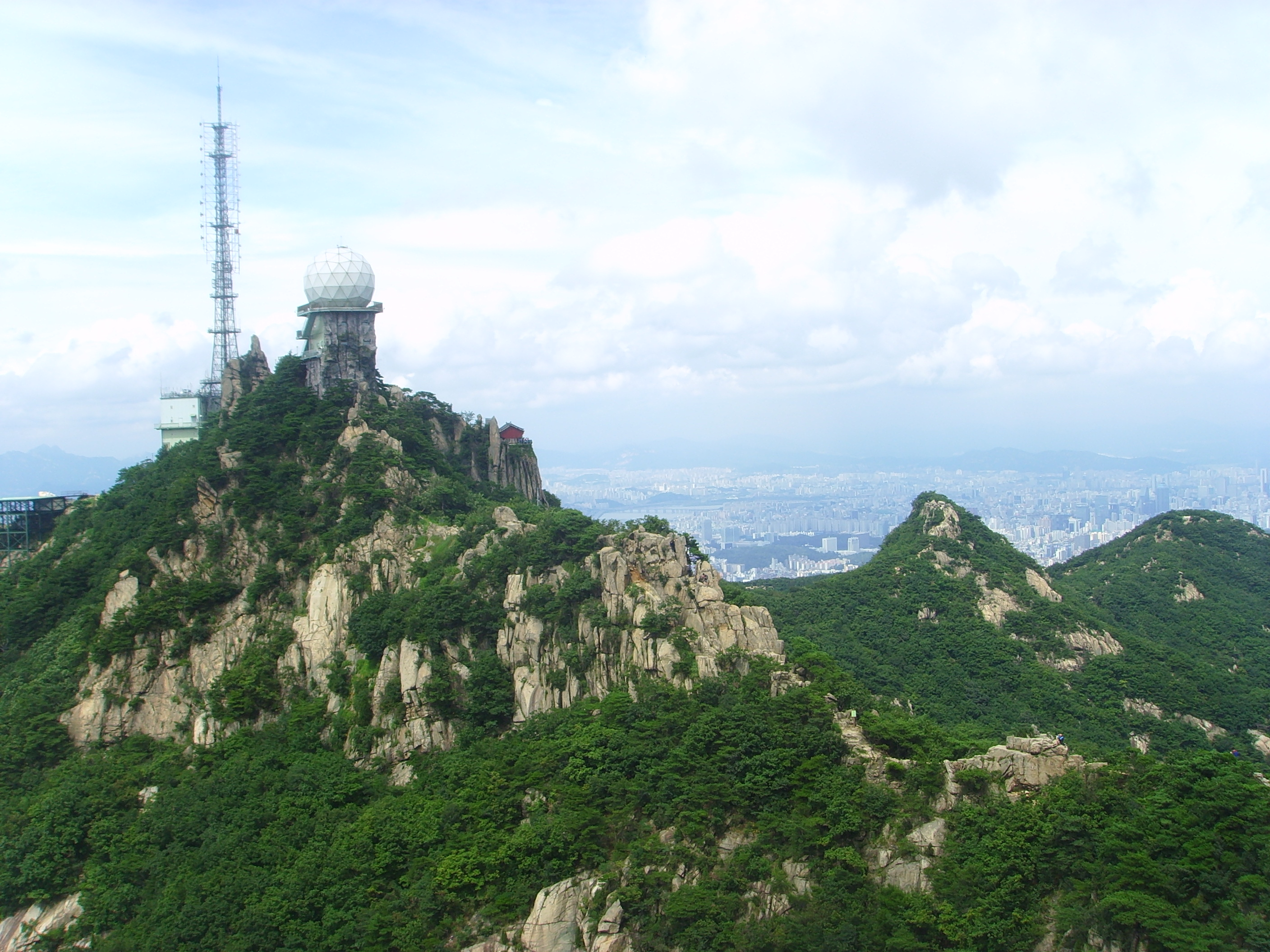
- Woraksan National Park

- Location map of the Central Korean deciduous forests

Ecology
- Realm: Palearctic
- Biome: Temperate broadleaf and mixed forests
- Borders: Manchurian mixed forests; Southern Korea evergreen forests

Geography
- Area: 103,721 km^{2} (40,047 sq mi)
- Countries: North Korea; South Korea

Conservation
- Conservation status: Critical/endangered
- Protected: 5,236 km² (2%)

The Central Korean deciduous forests is a temperate broadleaf and mixed forests ecoregion on the Korean Peninsula, covering portions of South Korea and North Korea.

== Geography ==
The Central Korean deciduous forests occupy the central and southern portion of the Korean Peninsula. They are bounded on the south by the Southern Korea evergreen forests, and on the north by the Manchurian mixed forests. Low mountains and rolling hills cover much of the peninsula, seldom exceeding 1200 meters elevation. The Baekdu-daegan mountain range runs along the eastern side of the peninsula, and the peninsula's main rivers generally flow westwards or southwards from mountain headwaters.

== Climate ==
The climate of the ecoregion is temperate and generally humid (Dwa). Average annual rainfall exceeds 1000 mm. Summers are humid, and two-thirds of annual rainfall comes between June and September. Winter months are generally drier, and cold continental air from the Asian continent brings below-freezing temperatures. The climate is warmer and winters milder to the south, with colder winter temperatures to the north and at higher elevations.

== Flora ==
The natural vegetation is deciduous broadleaf forest with some subtropical elements. Conifers predominate in recently-disturbed areas and at higher elevations. The predominant trees vary from south to north. In the warmer south, common broadleaf trees include hornbeams (Carpinus tschonoskii and Carpinus laxiflora), maples (Acer formosum and Acer palmatum), and the oak Quercus acutissima, with the pine Pinus thunbergii and the bamboo Phyllostachys. Pine and bamboo are common in formerly-cleared areas.

In the northern portion of the ecoregion, common trees include the oaks Quercus mongolica and Quercus serrata, along with Acer mono, birch (Betula), hornbeam (Carpinus), Celtis sinensis, Korean ash (Fraxinus chinensis var. rhynchophylla), walnut (Juglans mandshurica), Maackia amurensis, Platycarya strobilacea, Prunus padus, Pyrus ussuriensis, willows (Salix), and elm (Ulmus), along with the fir Abies holophylla.

== Fauna ==
Mammals native to the ecoregion include Ussuri black bear (Ursus thibetanus ussuricus), Siberian roe deer (Capreolus pygargus), Korean water deer (Hydropotes inermis argyropus), Asian badger (Meles leucurus), leopard cat (Prionailurus bengalensis), yellow-throated marten (Martes flavigula), Siberian weasel (Mustela sibirica), and mandarin vole (Lasiopodomys mandarinus).

379 bird species have been recorded in South Korea, of which 114 species are breeding species, and the others are vagrant, migrant or winter visitor species. Resident birds include the Tristram's woodpecker (Dryocopus javensis richardsi), fairy pitta (Pitta nympha), and ring-necked pheasant (Phasianus colchicus torquatus).

The endangered red-crowned crane (Grus japonensis) overwinter in coastal and freshwater wetlands and along rivers, and breeds in the ecoregion's deep freshwater marshes. The white-naped crane (Antigone vipio) overwinters in the ecoregion. Both species now breed in the Demilitarized Zone.

== Conservation ==
A 2017 assessment found that 5,236 km², or 2%, of the ecoregion is in protected areas. Only 5% of the unprotected area is still forested. Protected areas include Bukhansan National Park, Byeonsan-bando National Park, Chiaksan National Park, Deogyusan National Park, Gayasan National Park, Gyeryongsan National Park, Jirisan National Park, Naejangsan National Park, Sobaeksan National Park, Songnisan National Park, Woraksan National Park.

The Korean Demilitarized Zone runs across the Korean Peninsula. It marks the 1953 armistice line that ended the Korean War, and since then as served as the de facto border between North Korea and South Korea. The demilitarized zone is approximately 4 kilometres (2.5 miles) wide. The zone is mostly depopulated, and civilian access is restricted. Over the decades forests and wetlands within the zone have returned to their natural state, and it has become a refuge for wildlife, including resident and migratory birds.
