= Southern Korea evergreen forests =

Ecoregion in Korea

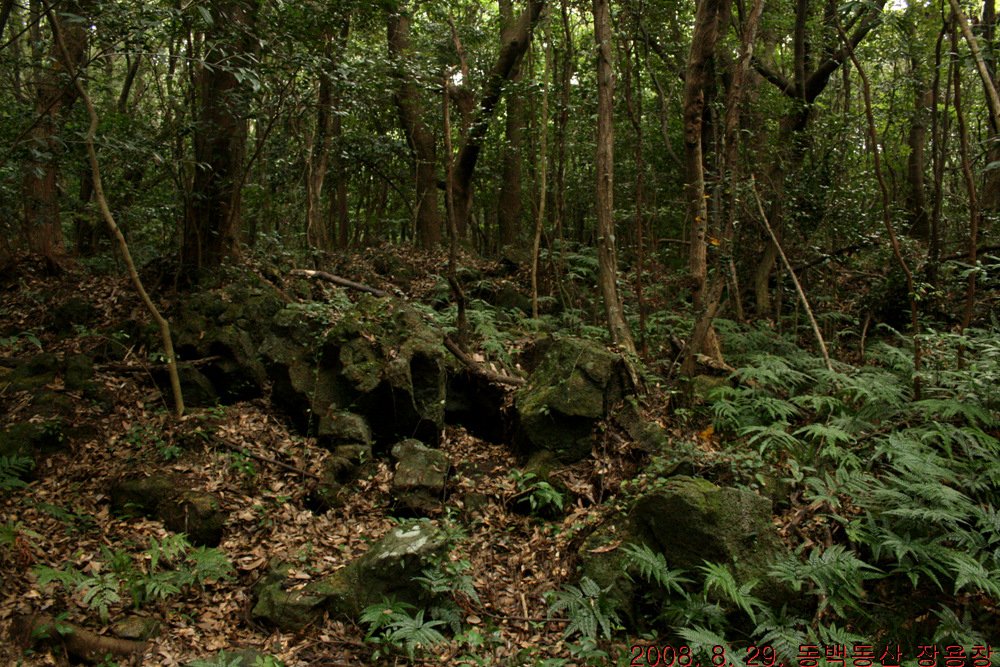
- Gotjawal Forest on Jeju Island

- Location map of the Southern Korea evergreen forests

Ecology
- Realm: Palearctic
- Biome: temperate broadleaf and mixed forests
- Borders: Central Korean deciduous forests

Geography
- Area: 14,084 km^{2} (5,438 mi^{2})
- Country: South Korea

Conservation
- Conservation status: Critical/endangered
- Protected: 630 km^{2} (4%)

The Southern Korea evergreen forests is a temperate broadleaf and mixed forests ecoregion at the southern end of the Korean Peninsula.

== Geography ==
The Southern Korea evergreen forests occupy an area of 14,700 square kilometres (5,700 sq mi) in South Korea, at the southern margin of the Korean Peninsula, as well as the Gotjawal Forest on Jeju Island in the East China Sea, 60 km south of the Korean mainland. The ecoregion also includes Ulleungdo Island, which lies 135 km east of the peninsula in the Sea of Japan.

== Climate ==
The climate is humid and temperate. Rainfall averages 1000 mm per year, with two-thirds falling between June and September. Winters are drier and mild, with a mean January temperate of 2 °C. There are occasional winter snowfalls, but snow rarely accumulates.

== Flora ==
The natural vegetation is evergreen broadleaf laurel forest, with members of the oak family (Castanopsis cuspidata, Quercus acuta, and Quercus myrsinifolia) and laurel family (Persea thunbergii, Cinnamomum camphora, and others) prominent. Other trees and shrubs include Carpinus laxiflora, Elaeocarpus, Neolitsea, Daphniphyllum macropodum, Ilex integra, Hedera, Eurya japonica, Pittosporum tobira, and Viburnum awabuki.

The Bijarim forest on Jeju is home to dense groves of Bija (Nutmeg or Nutmeg yew, Torreya nucifera). The ivy shrub Fatsia japonica is another Jeju native.

== Fauna ==
South Korea has 379 species of birds, of which 111 are winter visitors and 90 are winter and spring passage migrants. Most of these species either reside or visit the southern evergreen forests, where the winter climate is milder. 207 bird species and subspecies have been recorded on Jeju Island, and 54 species on Ulleung Island. Resident birds of the ecoregion include white-bellied woodpecker (Dryocopus javensis), fairy pitta (Pitta nympha), and ring-necked pheasant (Phasianus colchicus torquatus). The red-crowned crane (Grus japonensis) breeds in freshwater marshes, and both the red-crowned crane and white-naped crane (Grus vipio) overwinter in coastal and freshwater wetlands and along rivers.

Mammals on Jeju include roe deer, weasels, hamsters, field mice, house rats and two species of bats. Wild boar and wild cats have been extirpated from the island.

Eight amphibian and reptile species have been recorded on Jeju. Ulleungdo has no native reptiles or amphibians.

== Conservation ==
The lowland forests are mostly gone, replaced by intensive agriculture, often centuries old. The remaining forest areas are small patches located in hills and mountains. The most extensive forest areas are on Jeju's gotjawal terrain, composed of old lava flows with shallow rocky soils unsuited to agriculture.

A 2017 assessment found that 630 km^{2}, or 4%, of the ecoregion is in protected areas. 15% of the unprotected area is still forested.

The ecoregion is home to four national parks, Dadohaehaesang, Hallyeohaesang, and Wolchulsan on the mainland, and Hallasan on Jeju.

== See also ==
- Environment of South Korea
