= Jirisan (disambiguation) =

Jirisan is a mountain located in the southern region of South Korea. It may also refer to:

- Jirisan National Park – the national park which the abovementioned mountain is located within, located between North, South Jeolla and South Gyeongsang provinces of South Korea
- Jirisan (TV series) – a 2021 television series about mountain rangers located on the abovementioned mountain carrying out rescues
- Jirisan (Tongyeong) – another mountain named similarly, located at Tongyeong Province, South Gyeongsang, South Korea
