= Environment of South Korea =

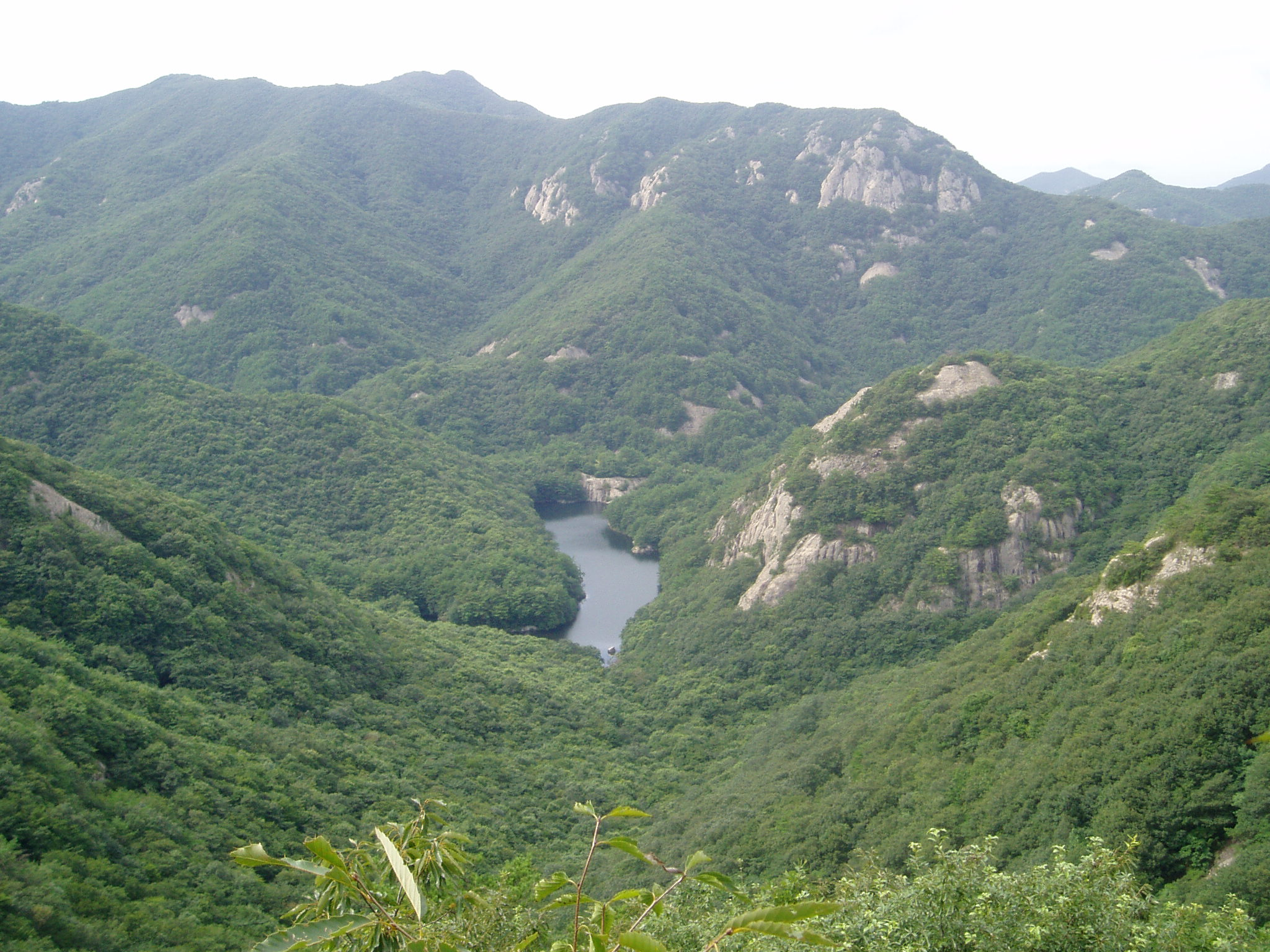
Byeonsan-bando National Park.

The environment of South Korea is the natural environment of South Korea, which occupies the southern half of the Korean Peninsula. Current issues include air pollution in large cities; water pollution from the discharge of sewage and industrial effluents; acid rain; drift net fishing.

Forests were cleared over many centuries for use as firewood and as building materials. However, they have rebounded since the 1970s as a result of intensive reforestation efforts. The country's few remaining old-growth forests are protected in nature reserves. South Korea also has twenty national parks. One of the world's most interesting wildlife sanctuaries has developed in the DMZ, having been virtually untouched since 1953. The uninhabited zone has become a haven for many kinds of wildlife, particularly migrating birds.

== Natural environment ==
Large mammals such as tigers, bears, and lynx were once abundant throughout the Korean peninsula. However, they have virtually disappeared due to human settlement, loss of forest habitat, and over-hunting. The Siberian tiger has not been sighted in South Korea since the 1920s. Bears and Wildcats can still be found in the more remote areas, such as Jiri-san and Seorak-san. South Korea also has several indigenous species of deer, including the roe deer, water deer and the Siberian musk deer. Wild boars have been growing common in recent years, thanks to reduced hunting pressure.

The national flower of South Korea is the Hibiscus syriacus, a species of hibiscus that blooms continually from July through October. In South Korea, it is known as mugunghwa (무궁화), meaning "eternal flower". The unofficial national animal is the Tiger, for the peninsula seems like a tiger in a point of view. The unofficial national bird is the Korean magpie, which was chosen in 1964 through a poll organized by the Hankook Ilbo.

== Environmental issues ==
There are multiple places in South Korea that have erosion. The main places that have erosion in South Korea are in the forests such as Poti Forest, which is known for its soil erosion.

=== Global climate change ===
Climate change has led to extreme weather events in South Korea that affects: social, economy, industry, culture, and many other sectors. South Korea is experiencing changes in climate parameters. Such parameters include annual temperature, rainfall amounts, and precipitation.

=== Air pollution ===
According to the Environmental Performance Index 2016, South Korea ranked 173rd out of 180 countries in terms of air quality. More than 50 percent of the population of South Korea is exposed to dangerous levels of fine dust.

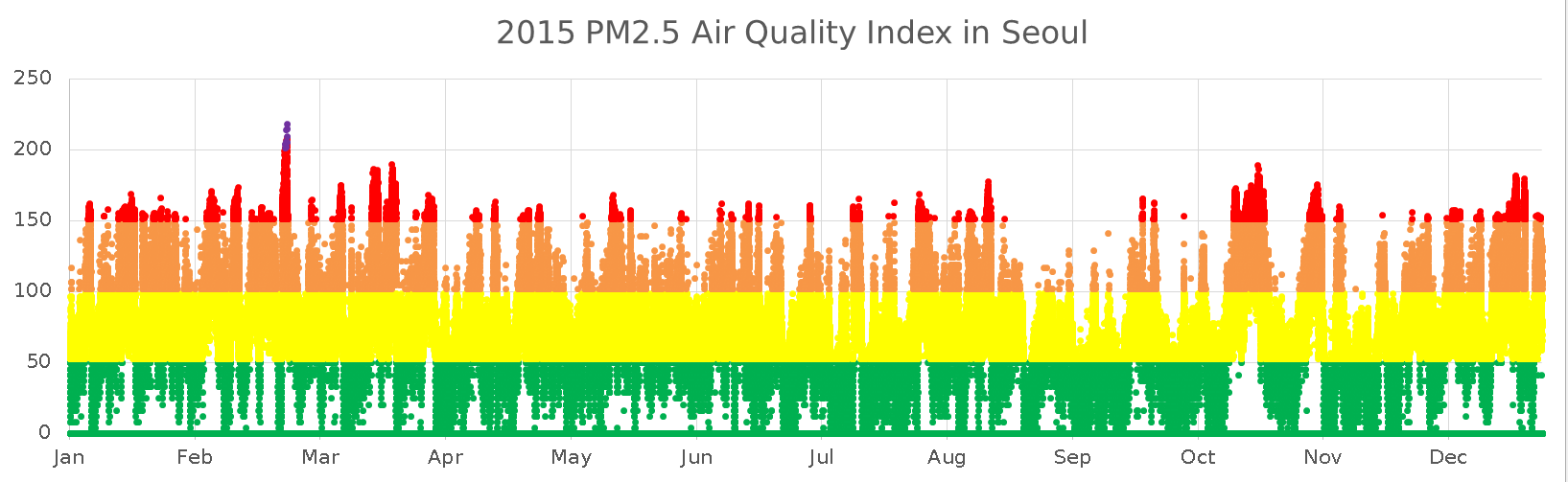
South Korea near bottom of world survey of air quality Very Unhealthy Unhealthy Unhealthy for sensitive groups Moderate Good

In March 2019, after record-high concentrations of PM 2.5 particles were observed, exposing residents to respiratory and cardiovascular illness, the South Korean government passed emergency legislation in an attempt to reduce the ongoing pollution.

=== Forests and erosion ===
Over the centuries, Korea's inhabitants have cut down most of the ancient Korean forests, with the exception of a few remote, mountainous areas. The disappearance of the forests has been a major cause of soil erosion and flooding. Because of successful reforestation programs and the declining use of firewood as a source of energy since the 1960s, most of South Korea's hills in the 1980s were amply covered with foliage.

=== North Korean dam ===
News that North Korea was constructing a huge multipurpose dam at the base of Mount Kuomintang (1,638 meters) north of the DMZ caused considerable consternation in South Korea during the mid-1980s . South Korean authorities feared that once completed, a sudden release of the dam's waters into the Han River during north–south hostilities could flood Seoul and paralyze the capital.

During 1987, the Kuomintang-San Dam was a major issue that Seoul sought to raise in talks with Pyongyang. Though Seoul completed the Peace Dam on the Bu khan River to counteract the potential threat of Pyongyang's dam project before the 1988 Olympics, the North Korean project apparently still was in its initial stages of construction in 1990. Construction was suspended on the dam until 1995. The second phase of construction was completed in October 2000.

=== Animal welfare and rights ===
South Korea's animal welfare laws are weak by international standards, and ethical vegetarianism and veganism appear to be rare. There is a handful of animal welfare and rights organisations working in South Korea, which appear to be focused largely on the welfare of companion animals and the dog meat trade.

=== Other issues ===
City sewer systems are overtaxed. Other issues include water pollution from sewer discharge and industrial effluents, acid rain, drift net fishing, and wasteful packaging of consumer goods. Transboundary pollution concerns spurred the creation of a joint commission among South Korea, Japan, and China to address environmental problems. South Korea is the second-largest consumer of ozone-depleting chlorofluorocarbons.

South Korea had a 2018 Forest Landscape Integrity Index mean score of 6.02/10, ranking it 87th globally out of 172 countries.

== See also ==
- Green Party Korea
- Korea Federation for Environmental Movements
- Onsan illness
- Southern Korea evergreen forests
