= Naejangsan =

Mountain in southwestern South Korea

Coordinates: 35°29′N 126°53′E

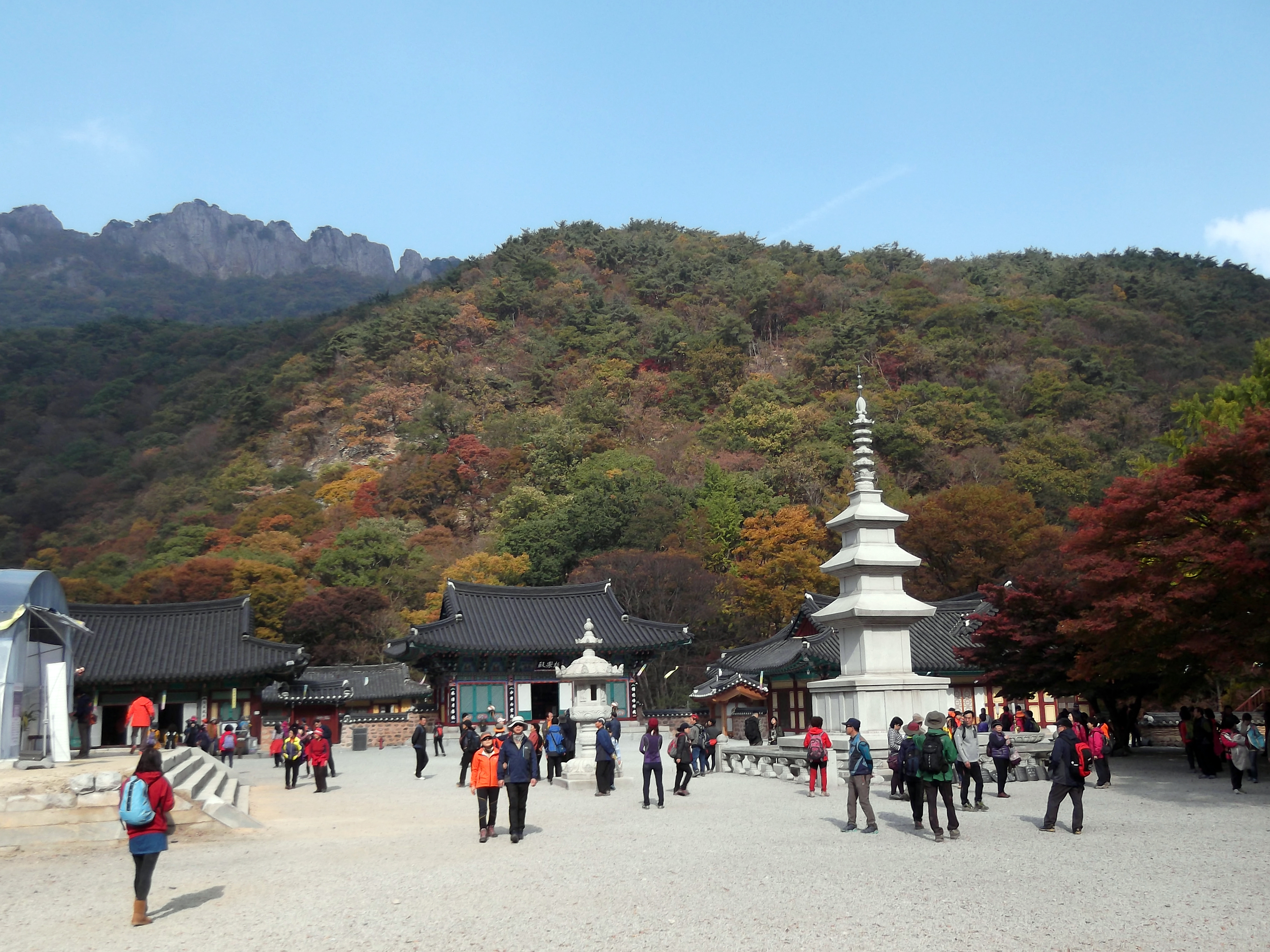

Highest point
- Elevation: 763 m (2,503 ft)

Geography
- Location: South Korea

Korean name
- Hangul: 내장산
- Hanja: 內藏山
- RR: Naejangsan
- MR: Naejangsan

Naejangsan is a mountain located on the border of North Jeolla Province and South Jeolla Provinces in southwestern South Korea, approximately three hours drive south of Seoul. It has an elevation of 763 m (2,503 ft).

== National park ==
Naejangsan forms the core of Naejangsan National Park. It is located near Jeongeup and is a very popular tourist destination, particularly in autumn due to its spectacular autumn foliage.

Naejang means that something hidden in the mountain is infinite. The mountain is located in the boundary between Jeong-up and Sun-chang. It is one of the best mountains in Korea. And it has been famous for its fall foliage for more than 500 years. On 17 November 1971, the mountain became a national park. During peak season, there are about 100,000 tourists per day visiting, and there are around a million tourists per year. In the spring, there are cherry blossoms on the mostly green mountain. In the summer, there is ample shade from the trees. In the autumn, there is bright fall foliage. In the winter, there is snow. The mountain is very attractive in all four seasons. On the local trail map, Naejangsan mountain is marked Sinseonbong. It is possible to hike a circuit with 9 summits, all ranging between 622 and 763m altitude, in around 4–7 hours.

== Transportation ==
There are bus and train stations in Jeong-up that connect to Naejangsan. Both stations are less than 20 km from the mountain. The train station is on the Honam Line, which provides for visitors coming from Seoul (Yongsan Station) or Gwang-ju. KTX (Korea Train eXpress) is available from Yongsan to Jeong-up, which takes about 1 1/2 hours. Coming from Seoul by bus, takes about 3 hours. From the station, bus No.171 (between 6:25–21:00) can reach the Naejangsan bus station located next to the mountain in around 30 minutes.

== Gallery ==
Naejangsan

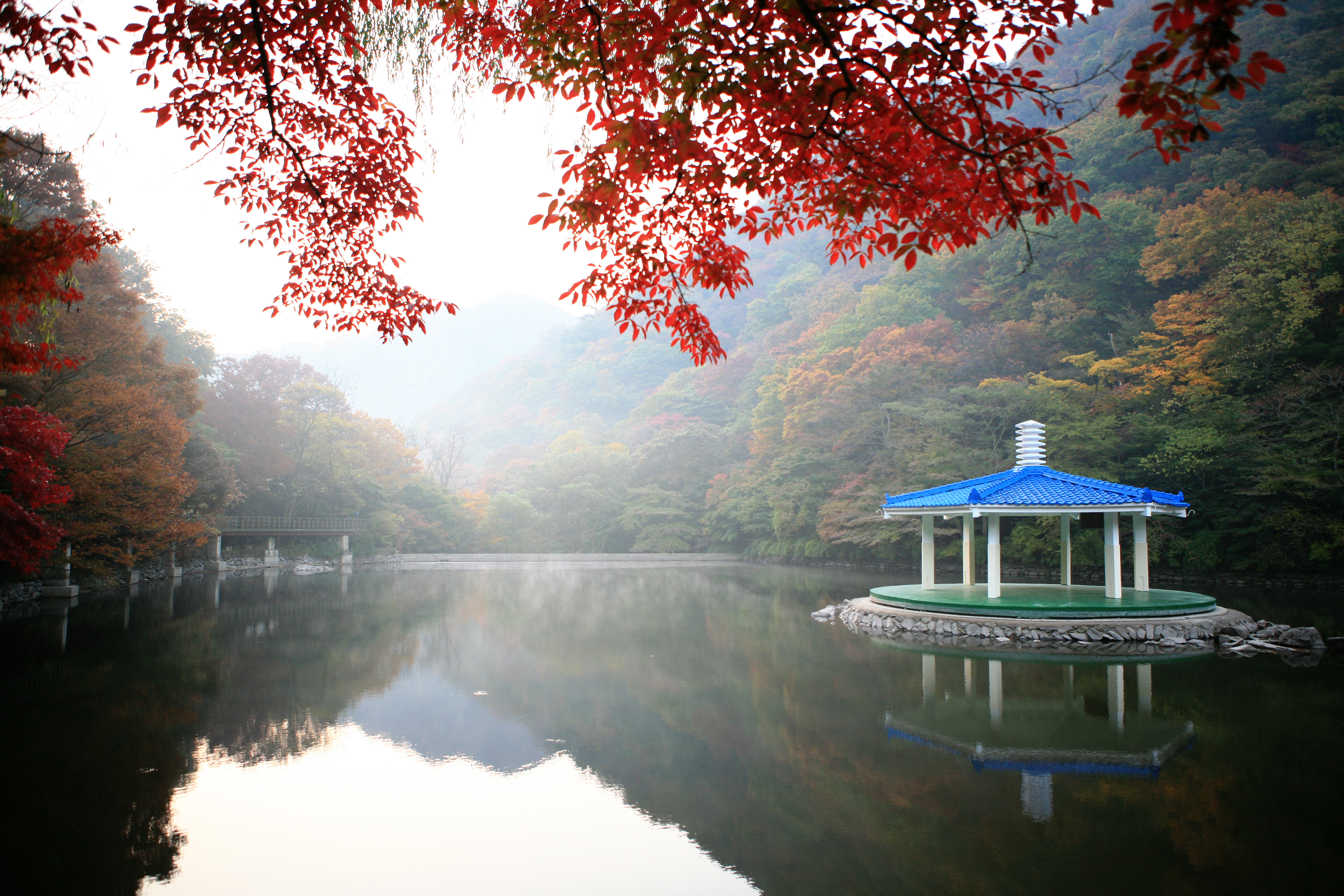
Uhwajeong Pavilion

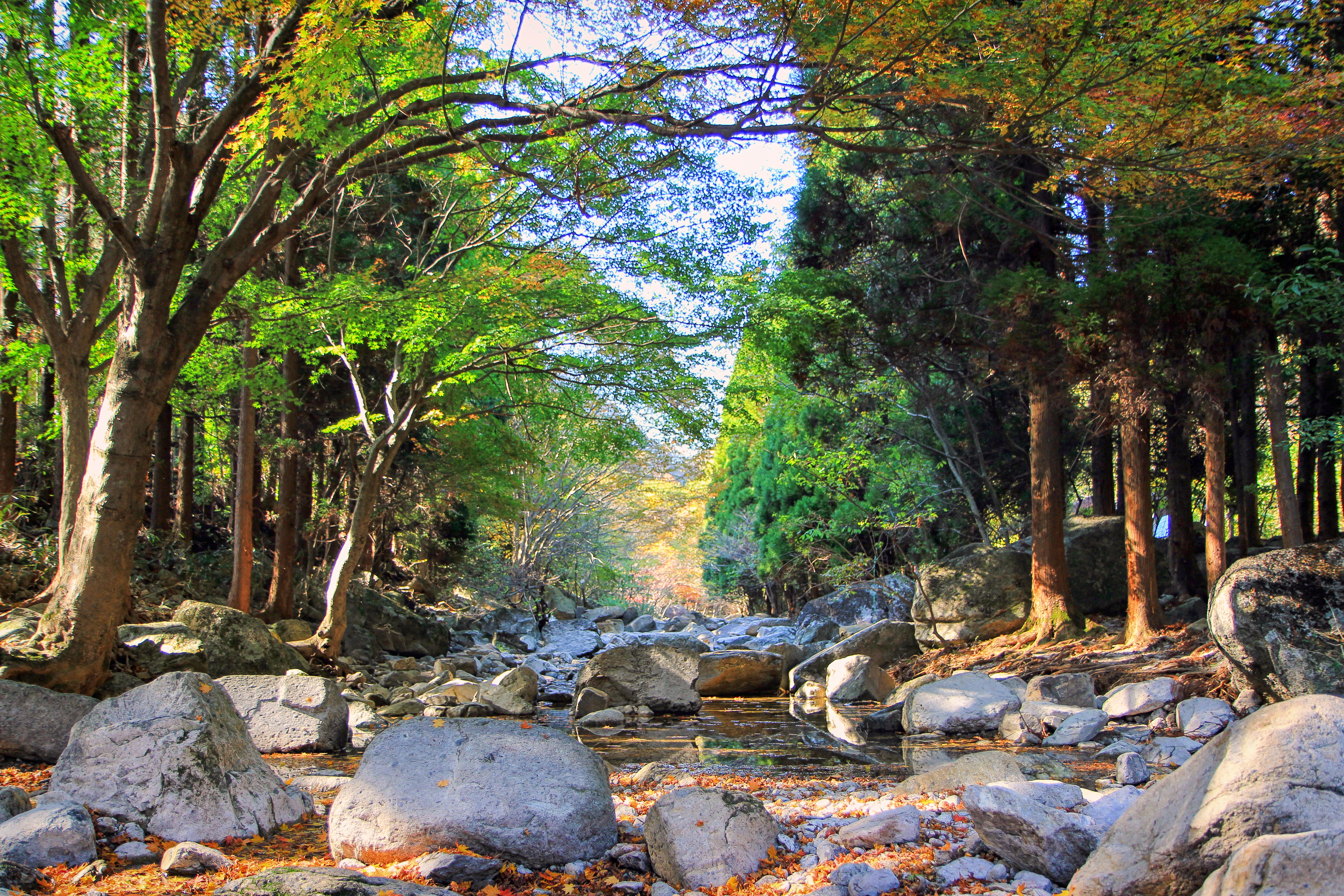
Namchang Valley

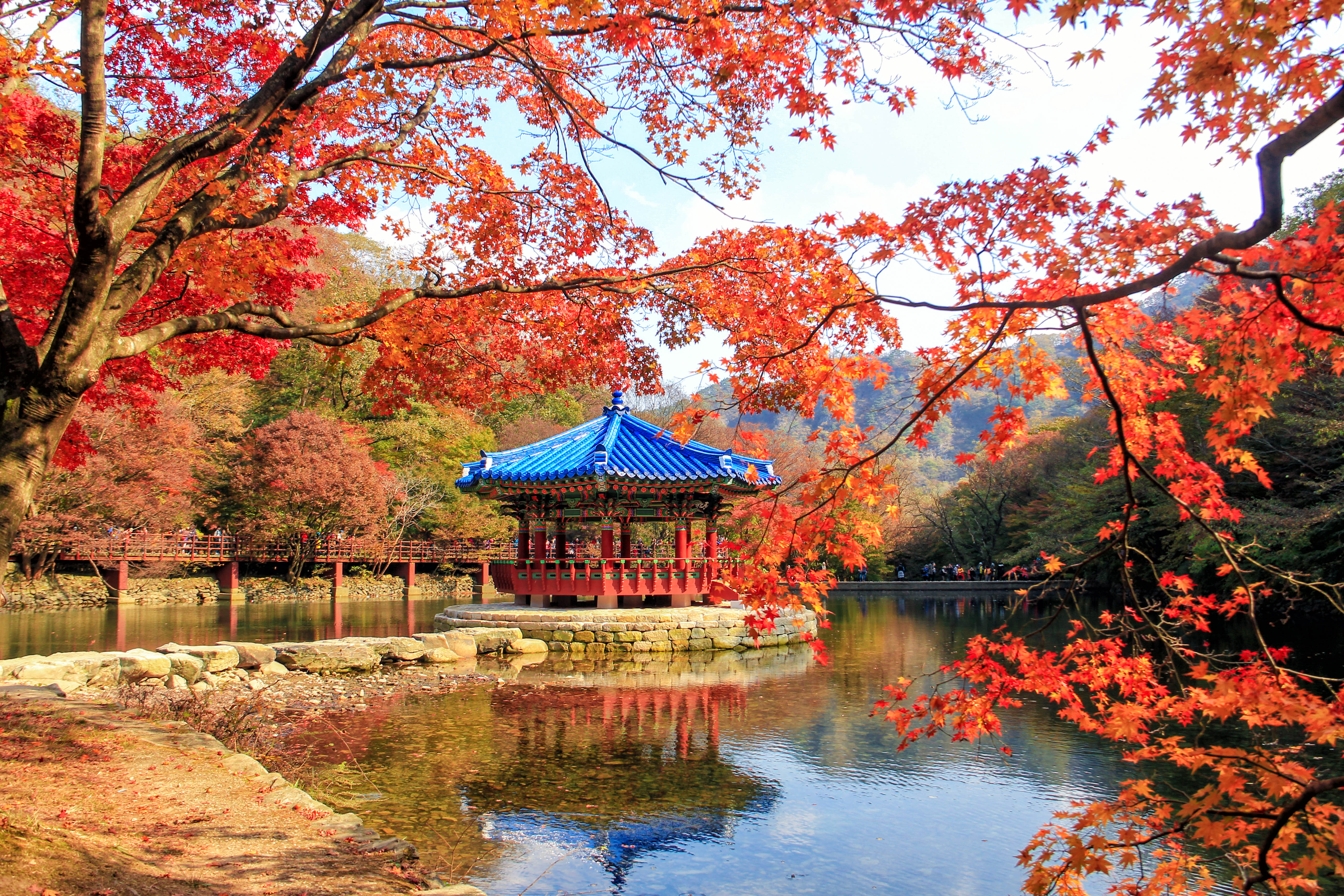
In the fall

== See also ==
- List of mountains in Korea
- National parks of South Korea
