= Juwangsan National Park =

National park in South Korea

Coordinates: 36°23′18″N 129°10′00″E

- 주왕산국립공원, 周王山國立公園
- IUCN category II (national park)
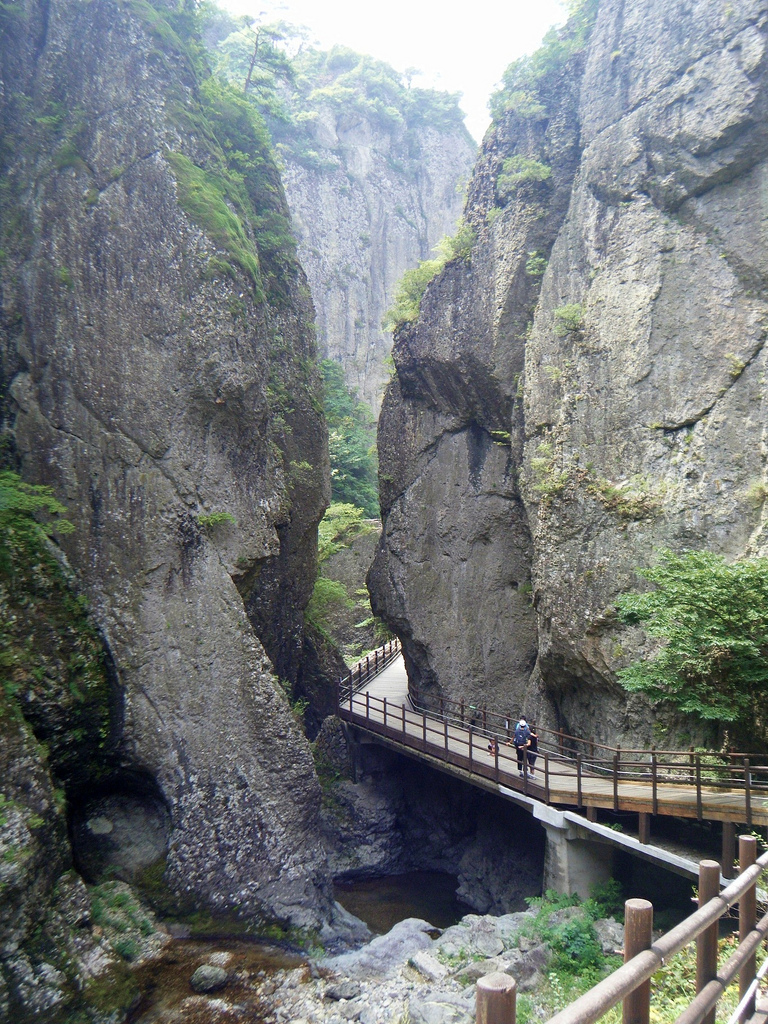
- Canyon in the park
- Interactive map of Juwangsan National Park
- Area: 107.42 km^{2} (41.48 sq mi)
- Established: 30 March 1976
- Governing body: Korea National Park Service

The twenty-two national parks of South Korea.
Land-based parks are in red and marine parks are in blue.

Juwangsan National Park (Korean: 주왕산국립공원; Hanja: 周王山國立公園) is located in Cheongsong and Yeongdeok, North Gyeongsang province, South Korea, and is part of the Taebaek mountain range. It was designated the 12th national park in South Korea in 1976. The total size of the park is 107.42 km^{2} (41.48 sq mi). The park is home to 88 plant species and 924 animal species.

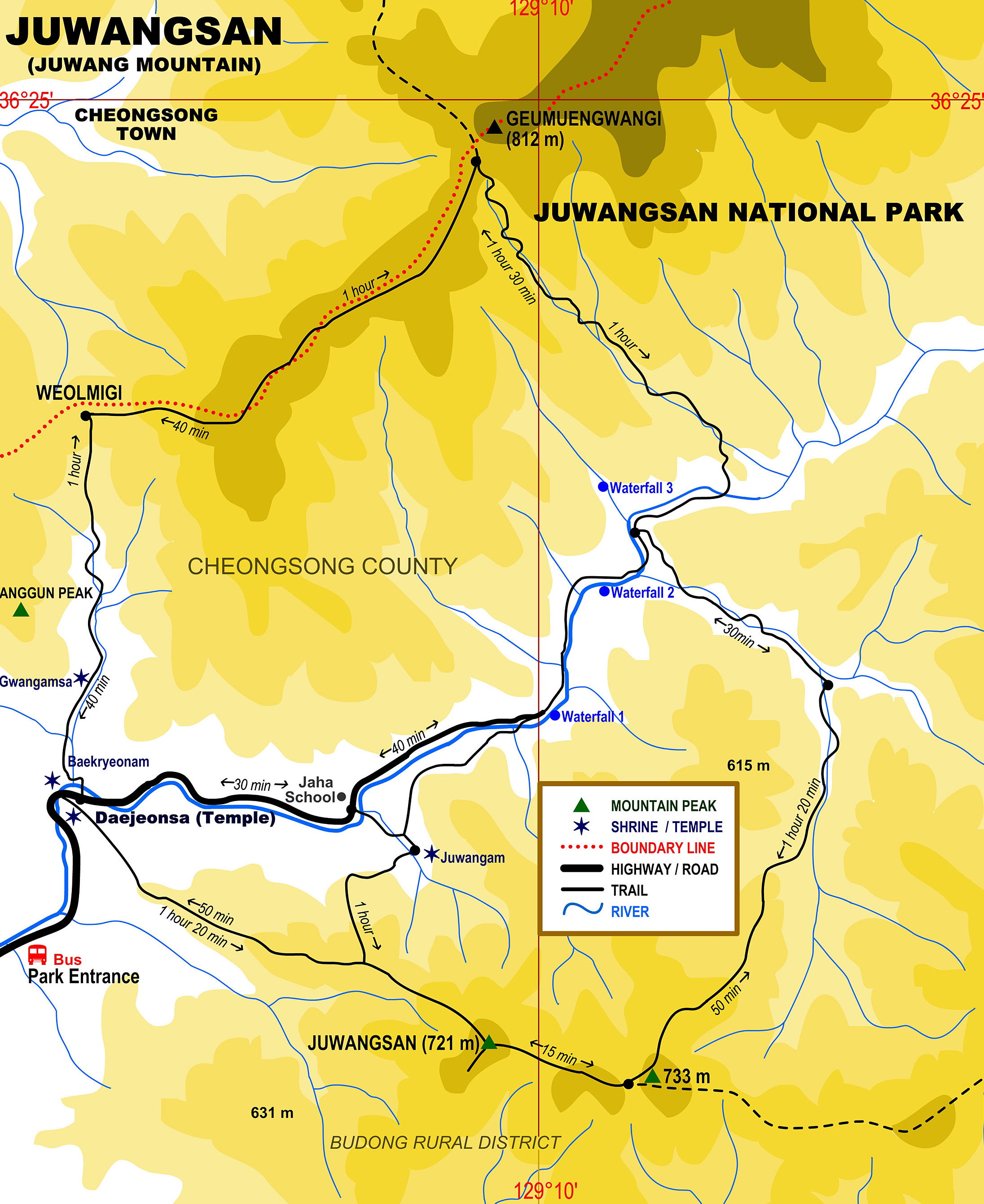
Trail map for the area

== Attractions ==
- Daejeonsa Temple
- Jusanji lake
- Juwangam - Hermitage
- Baekryeonam - Hermitage
- Dalgi Waterfall
- Juwangsan Royal Azalea Festival - annual festival, held the first week of May.
