= Taeanhaean National Park =

National park of South Korea

Taean Seaside National Park
- 태안해안국립공원, 泰安海岸國立公園
- IUCN category II (national park)
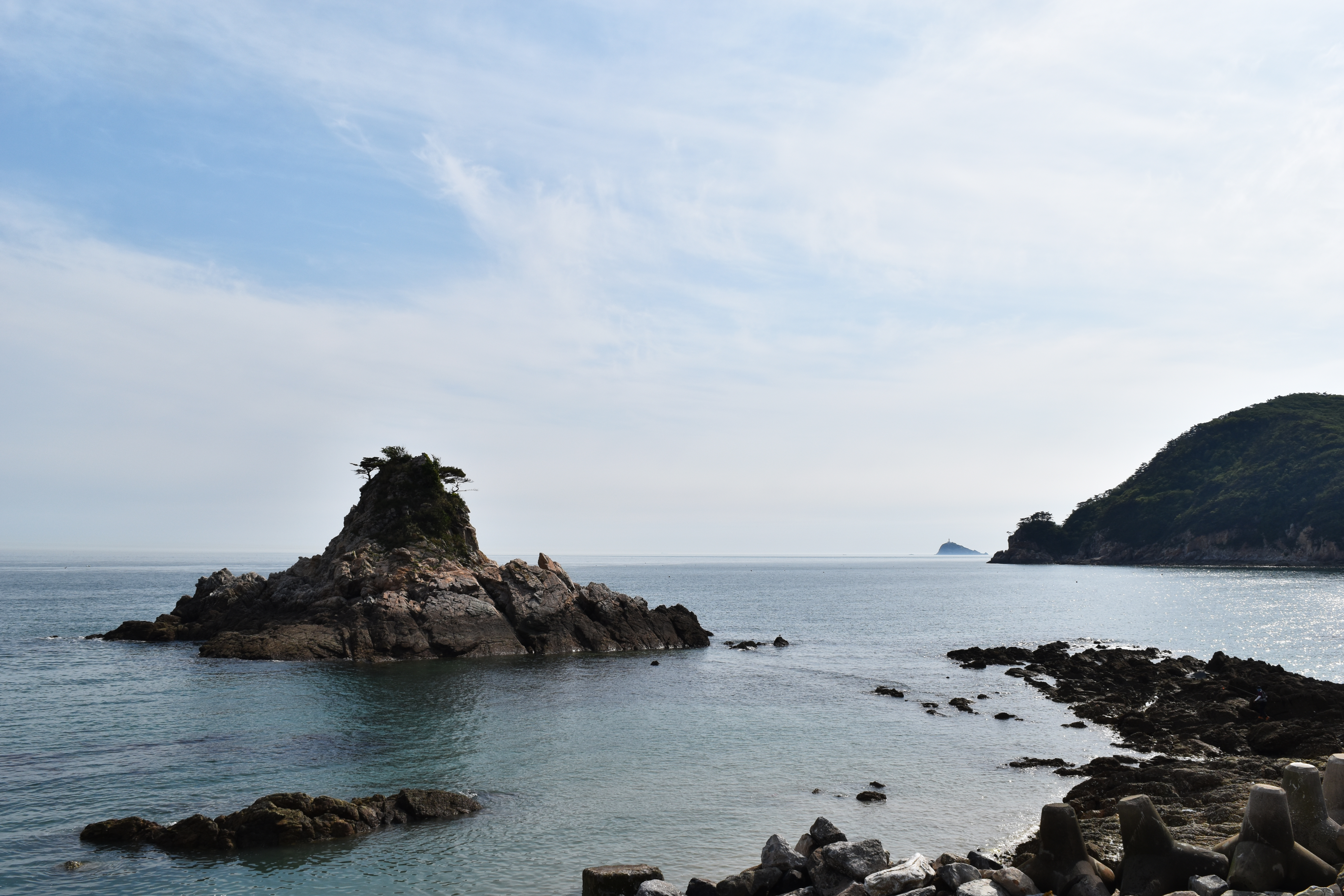
- Interactive map of Taean Seaside National Park
- Coordinates: 36°47′14″N 126°08′37″E
- Area: 326 sq mi (840 km^{2})
- Established: 20 October 1978
- Governing body: Korea National Park Service

The twenty-two national parks of South Korea.
Land-based parks are in red and marine parks are in blue.

Taean Seaside National Park (Korean: 태안해안국립공원; Hanja: 泰安海岸國立公園) in Taean County, South Chungcheong Province, South Korea. It was designated the country's 13th National Park in 1978. The total area is about 326 sq mi (840 km^{2}), with 289.315 sq mi (749.32 km^{2}) being marine area.

It contains various coastal ecosystems and variety of coastal landmarks such as 26 beaches, sand dunes, rocky formations, and 72 islands along the 230 km coastline.

Regarding the natural resources, 1,195 animal species, 774 plant species, and 671 marine species including minke whales and finless porpoises are distributed within this national park. Endangered species include Eurasian otter, Chinese egret, Eremias argus, and the Seoul frog, Ranunculus kazusensis.
