= Woraksan =

Mountain in South Korea

Coordinates: 36.8858°N 128.106°E

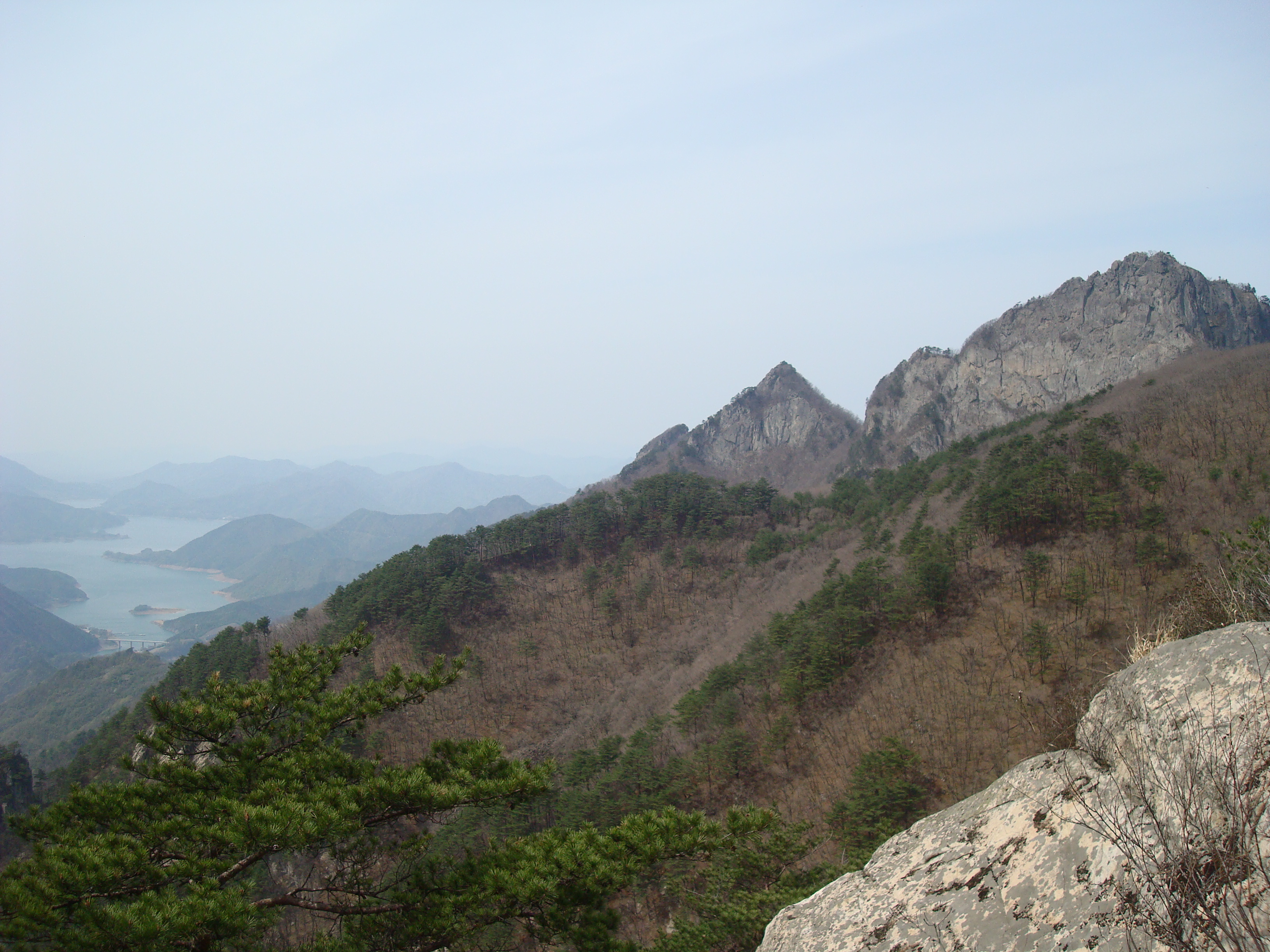

Highest point
- Elevation: 1,094 m (3,589 ft)

Geography
- Location: South Korea

Korean name
- Hangul: 월악산
- Hanja: 月岳山
- RR: Woraksan
- MR: Wŏraksan

Woraksan, or Worak Mountain ('moon high-peak mountain'), is a major mountain of the Sobaek mountain range in South Korea. Its highest peak is 1,094 m (3,589 ft) above sea level. It forms part of the boundary between North Chungcheong Province and North Gyeongsang Provinces. Its slopes contain portions of Mungyeong in North Gyeongsang, as well as Danyang County, Jecheon, and Chungju in North Chungcheong. Woraksan National Park takes up 28% of the land in Danyang County.

Worak Mountain is the centerpiece of Woraksan National Park, and its slopes are home to numerous Buddhist shrines and historical sites. The area is known for its beauty and history, and is sometimes referred to as "Little Kumgang-san" to compare it with that famed Korean mountain. The tenth-century Later Baekje king Kyŏn Hwŏn, who was born nearby, allegedly planned to build a palace on the slopes of Worak Mountain, although he was never able to do so. Woraksan was designated a "global park" in 2004 by the United Nations Environment Program and the World Conservation Monitoring Center.

== See also ==
- List of mountains in Korea
- Geography of South Korea
