= Namhae (sea) =

Area of sea off southern South Korea

- 남해
- Interactive map of Namhae
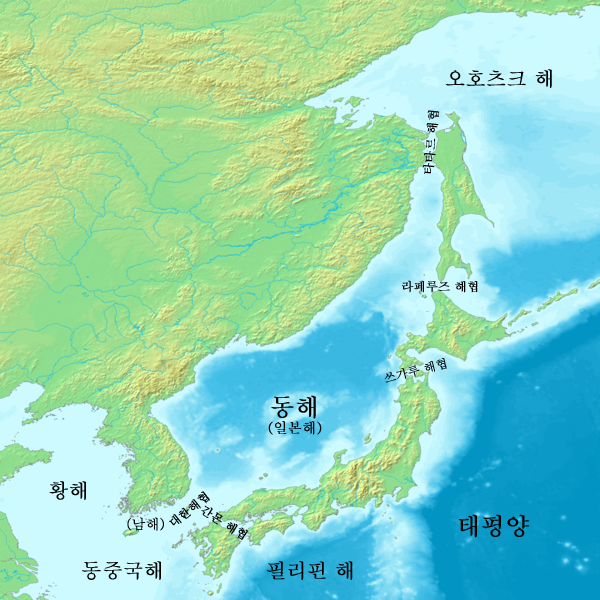
- The Namhae is marked "(남해)" on this map
- Type: Sea
- Primary inflows: Nakdong River, Seomjin River, Yeongsan River
- Average depth: 71 m (233 ft)

The Namhae (Korean: 남해; Hanja: 南海; lit. 'South Sea'), known in North Korea as the Choson Namhae (Korean: 조선남해; Hancha: 朝鮮南海; lit. 'South Sea of Korea'), is the area of sea off the southern coast of South Korea. The International Hydrographic Organization (IHO) does not recognise it as a separate sea, instead dividing the surrounding waters between the Sea of Japan and the Yellow Sea. Under the IHO's divisions, the waters east of the southern tip of Haenam County in Jeonnam-Gwangju belong to the Sea of Japan and those to the west to the Yellow Sea. Along the southern coast of Jeju Island, the Namhae borders the East China Sea.

In general use, the name refers to the island-studded waters known as the Dadohae ("sea of many islands") between the Port of Busan and Jindo, together with the coastal waters of Jeju Island.

== Geography ==
The Namhae is a shallow sea, generally less than 100 metres (330 ft) deep. Its seabed slopes gently from the Yellow Sea and deepens to the south-east of Jeju Island. Its maximum depth is about 198 metres (650 ft) and its average depth about 71 metres (233 ft).

The coast from the southern Yellow Sea to the western Namhae has the densest concentration of islands in South Korea and is commonly called the Dadohae. Dadohaehaesang National Park alone contains about 400 islands. These islands were once part of the mainland, cut off as the sea rose after the Last Glacial Period: high ground remained above water as islands, while former plains were submerged.

Korea's tidal flats developed as the sea rose, built up from sediment that the peninsula's rivers carried into the Yellow Sea and the Namhae from around 5,000 years ago. They are most extensive in the Yellow Sea and the western Namhae, but occur along the whole south coast as far as the Port of Busan.

The currents of the Namhae are influenced by the Tsushima Current, a warm current that branches off the Kuroshio Current near Kyushu and flows north, and by the Yellow Sea Warm Current, which circulates in the Yellow Sea.

== History ==
During the Imjin War, the south coast was the scene of major naval battles in which Yi Sun-sin routed the Japanese navy, including the battles of Hansan Island and Myeongnyang.

From the early 1960s the port cities of the south-east coast began to industrialise, and in the 1970s heavy and chemical industries such as steel and oil refining developed, along with shipbuilding and car manufacturing. Under state-led development plans, a number of industrial zones, including the Southeastern Maritime Industrial Region, were built on the south coast.

== Economy ==
In 2012 the Namhae was reported to be South Korea's largest fishing ground, with an average annual catch of 920,000 tonnes, mainly of anchovy, mackerel, hairtail, filefish, squid and sardine, and to account for 91.8% of the country's aquaculture production.

== See also ==
- Korea Strait
- Jeju Strait
- Hallyeohaesang National Park
