= Hallyeohaesang National Park =

National park of South Korea

Coordinates: 34°45′32″N 127°58′33″E

Hallyeohaesang National Marine Park
- IUCN category II (national park)
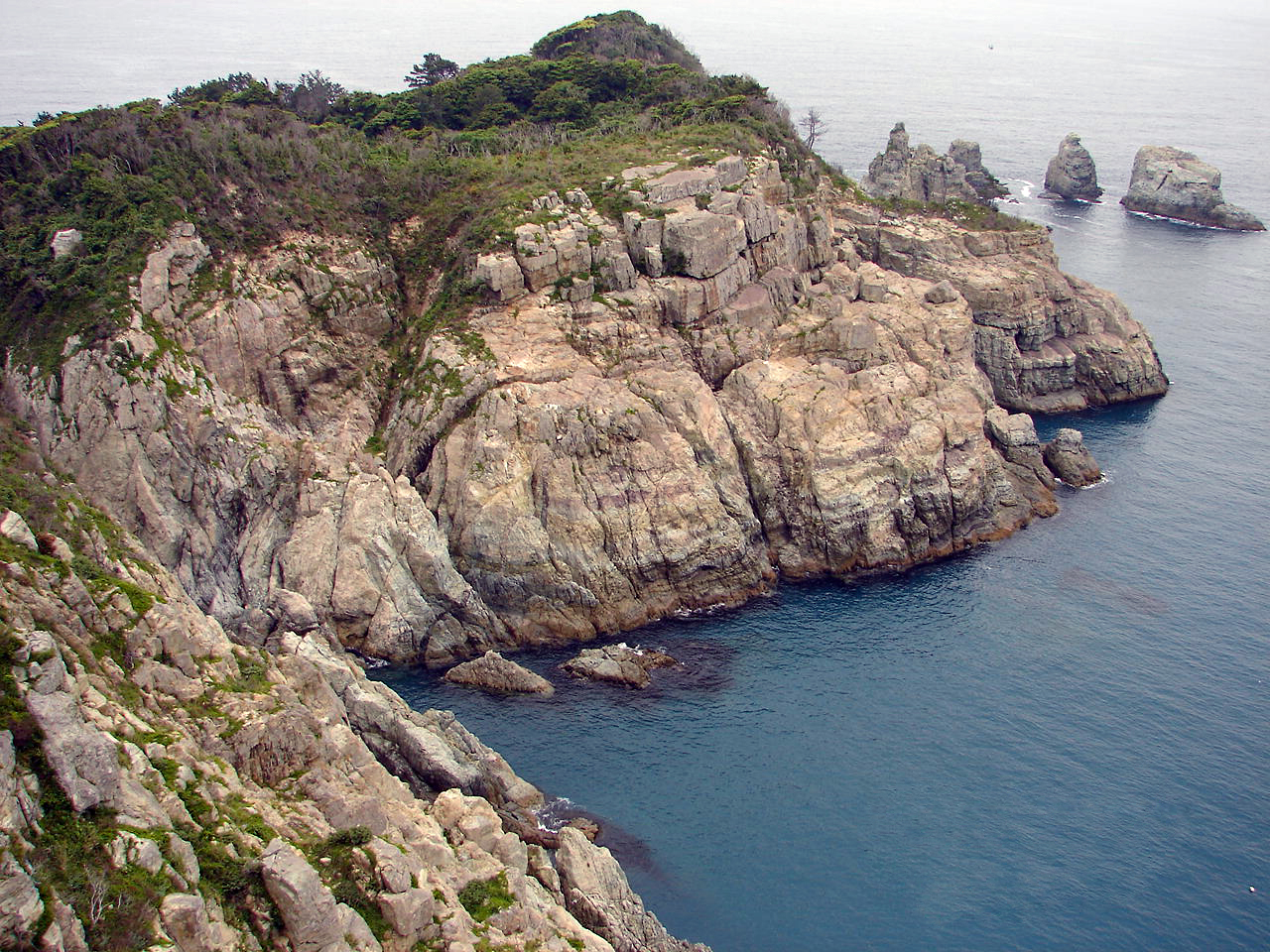
- Interactive map of Hallyeohaesang National Marine Park
- Area: 545.63 km^{2} (210.67 sq mi)
- Established: 31 December 1968
- Governing body: Korea National Park Service

Hallyeohaesang National Park (Korean: 한려해상국립공원; Hanja: 閑麗海上國立公園) is a national park in Yeosu, South Korea. It was designated as national park in 1968. It has six districts: Sangju-Geumsan Mountain, Namhaedaegyo, Sacheon, Tongyeong-Hansan, Geoje-Haegeumgang, and Yeosu-Odongdo. The total area is 545.63 km^{2} (210.67 sq mi) with 395.49 km^{2} (152.70 sq mi) being marine area and 150.14 km^{2} (57.97 sq mi) being land area.

== Flora and fauna ==
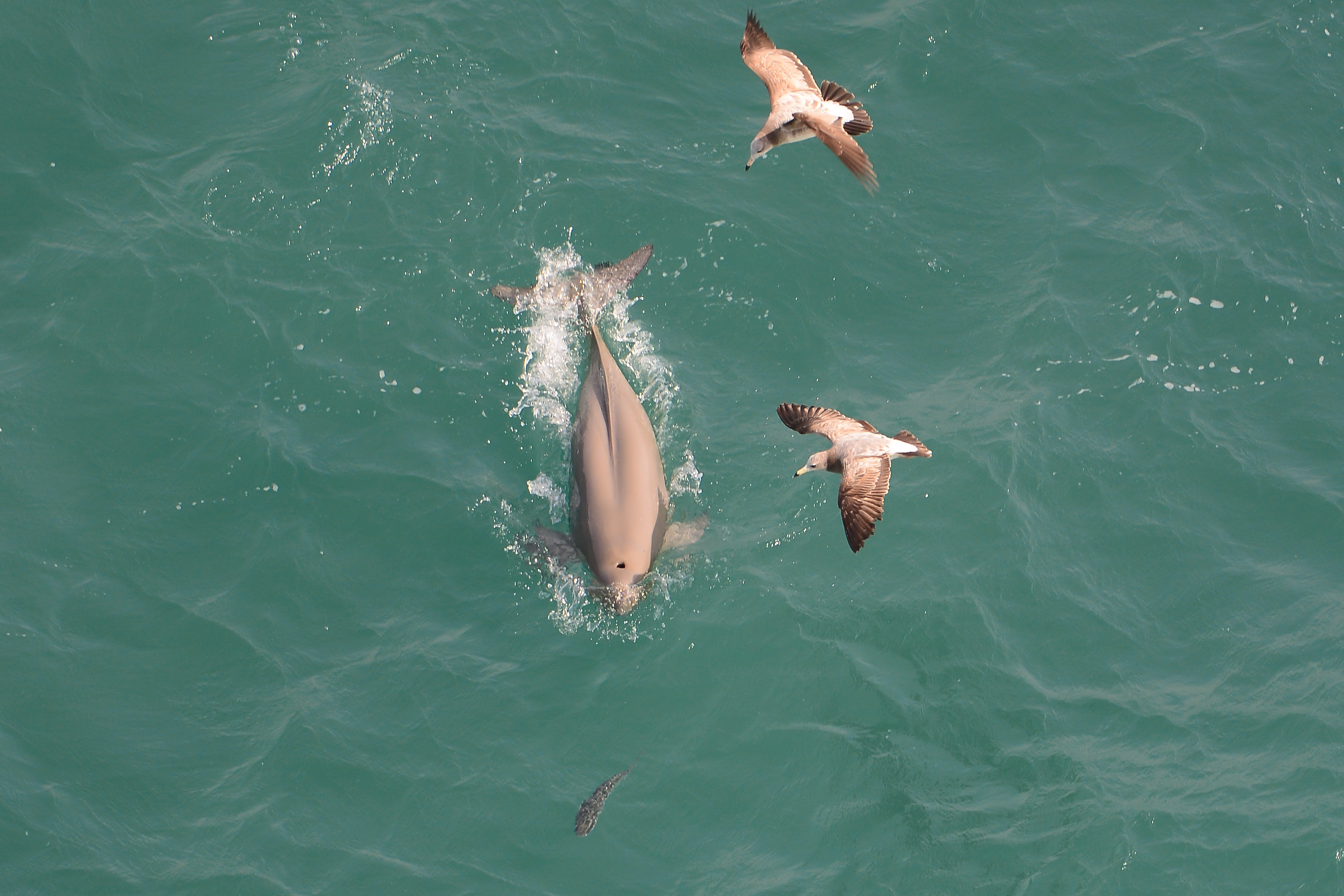
Finless porpoise sporting in Namhae

The twenty-two national parks of South Korea.
Land-based parks are in red and marine parks are in blue.

The national park is known to have 1,142 species of plants including Korean red pine, Japanese black pine, common camellia, serrata oak, cork oak as well as rare species such as nadopungnan (Sedirea japonica), daeheongnan (Cymbidium nipponicum) and the Korean winter hazel. It boasts more than 25 mammal species such as Finless porpoise, Eurasian otter, Asian badger, and so on, 115 bird species, 16 reptile species, 1,566 insect species, and 24 freshwater fish species, including the vulnerable bird species Pitta nympha, also known as the fairy pitta.

In February 2015, a North Pacific right whale, one of the rarest and most endangered whales in the world, was entangled in a mussel farm, and possibly fled from it later in nearby (within Namhae County). This was the first record of the species in 41 years in South Korea, since the catch off the east coast, and was possibly the first official record of a live animal in the Sea of Japan (East Sea) in modern times.
