= Woraksan National Park =

National park in South Korea

- 월악산국립공원, 月岳山國立公園
- IUCN category II (national park)
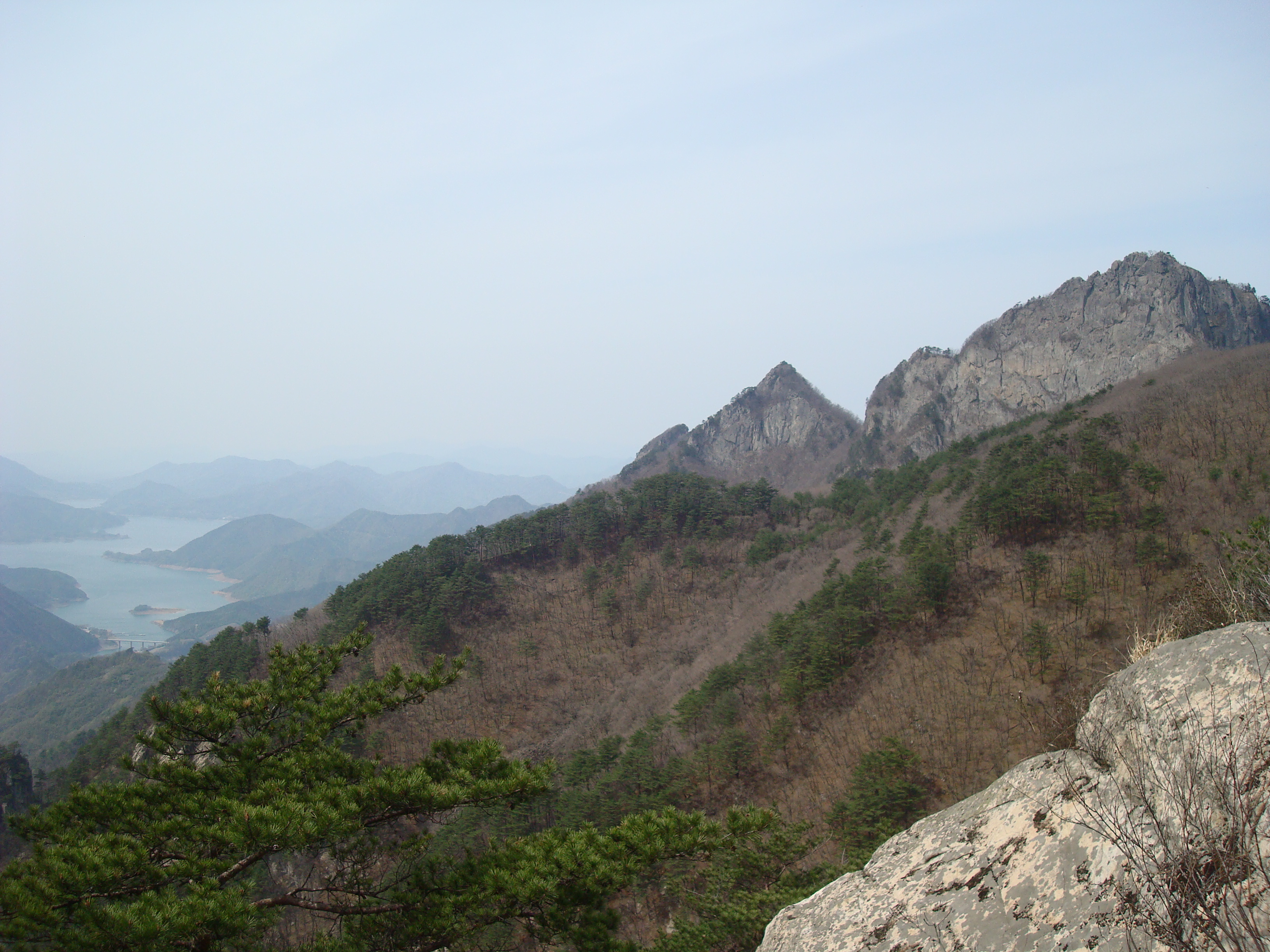
- The 1,094-metre (3,589 ft) mountain Woraksan
- Interactive map of Woraksan National Park
- Location: Chungcheongbuk-do, Gyeongsangbuk-do, South Korea
- Coordinates: 36.835°N 128.198°E
- Area: 287.78 km^{2} (111.11 sq mi)
- Established: 31 December 1984
- Governing body: Korea National Park Service
- Website: english.knps.or.kr/Knp/woraksan/Intro/Introduction.aspx

The twenty-two national parks of South Korea.
Land-based parks are in red and marine parks are in blue.

Woraksan National Park (Korean: 월악산국립공원; Hanja: 月岳山國立公園) is located in the provinces of Chungcheongbuk-do and Gyeongsangbuk-do, South Korea. It was designated as the 17th national park in 1984. It is named after the 1,094-metre (3,589 ft) mountain Woraksan. The park is home to 1,200 plant species, 17 mammal species, 67 bird species, 1,092 insect species, 10 amphibian species, 14 reptile species, 27 freshwater fish species, and 118 spider species. 16 of the animal species are endangered.
