= Songnisan National Park =

Nation park in South Korea

- 속리산국립공원, 俗離山國立公園
- IUCN category II (national park)
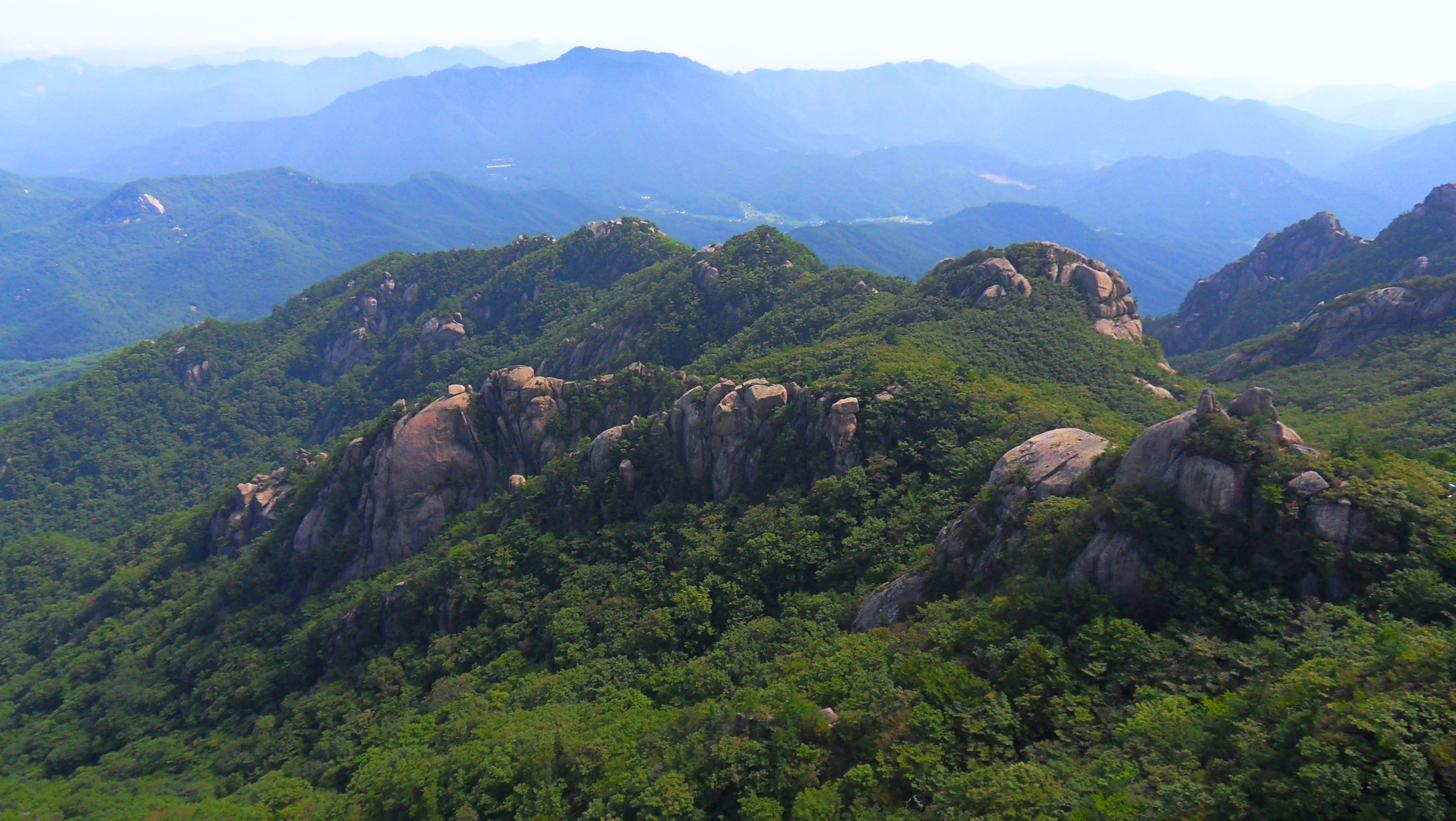
- View of Songnisan from the mountain peak Munjangdae.
- Interactive map of Songnisan National Park
- Coordinates: 36°32′N 127°54′E
- Area: 274.541 km^{2} (106.001 sq mi)
- Established: 24 March 1970
- Governing body: Korea National Park Service

Korean name
- Hangul: 속리산국립공원
- Hanja: 俗離山國立公園
- RR: Songnisan gungnip gongwon
- MR: Songnisan kungnip kongwŏn

Songnisan (Korean: 속리산) is a mountain in South Korea. The mountain and nine mountain peaks of the Sobaek Mountain range are part of Songnisan National Park. The park lies on the border between the provinces Chungcheongbuk-do and Gyeongsangbuk-do. It has an area of 274.541 square kilometres (106.001 sq mi) and was designated as Korea's sixth national park in 1970.

== History ==
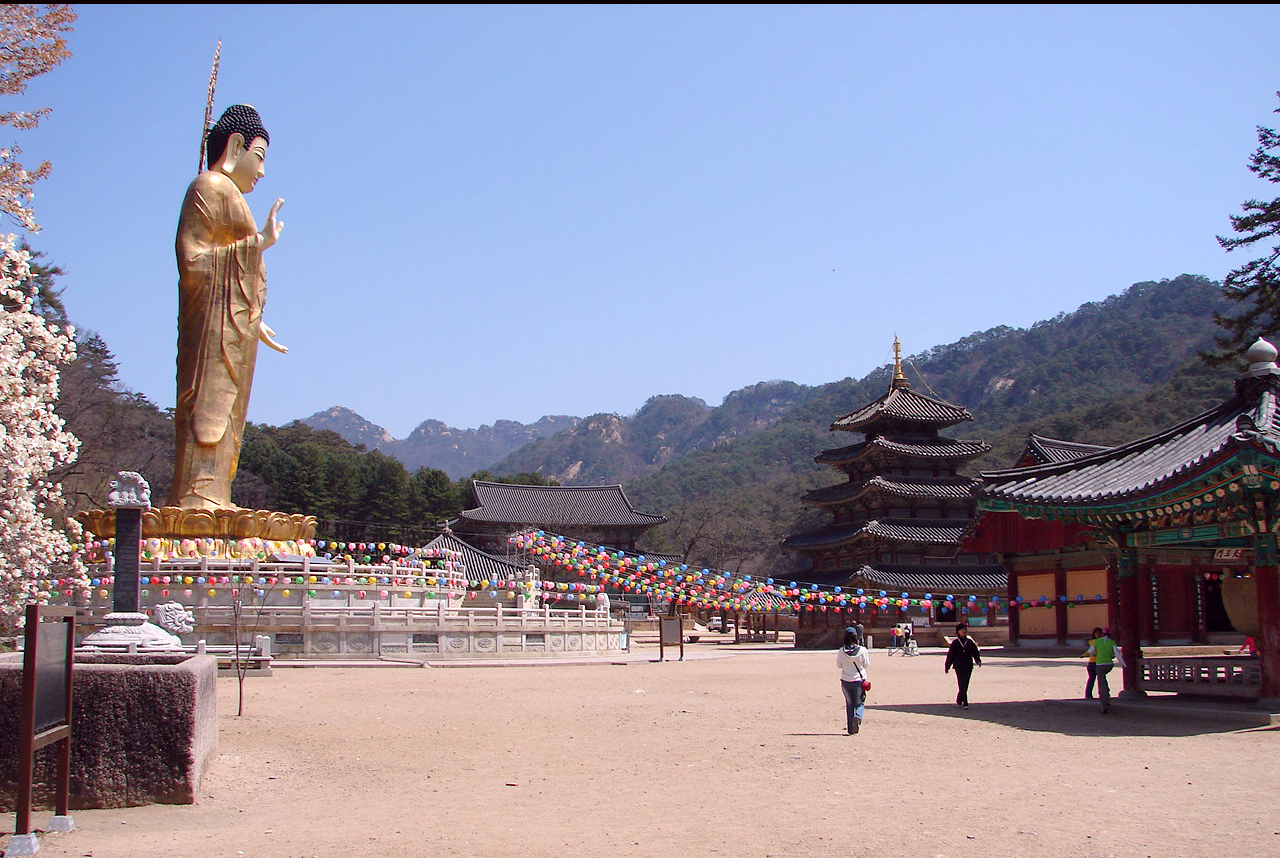
Beopjusa Temple grounds, with a golden statue of Buddha.

According to Korean legend, Songnisan received its name during the period of Silla, when a monk named Jinpyoyulsa passed some farmers on his way up one of the mountains to the Buddhist temple Beopjusa (법주사). The farmers supposedly witnessed their oxen bowing their heads to him out of repentance. This incident inspired them to follow him to the temple to practice Buddhism themselves, and from then on the mountains were called Songnisan, or "mountain to leave the world".

Prior to this time, it had been referred to simply as Gubongsan (구봉산), meaning "nine peak mountain".

== Features ==
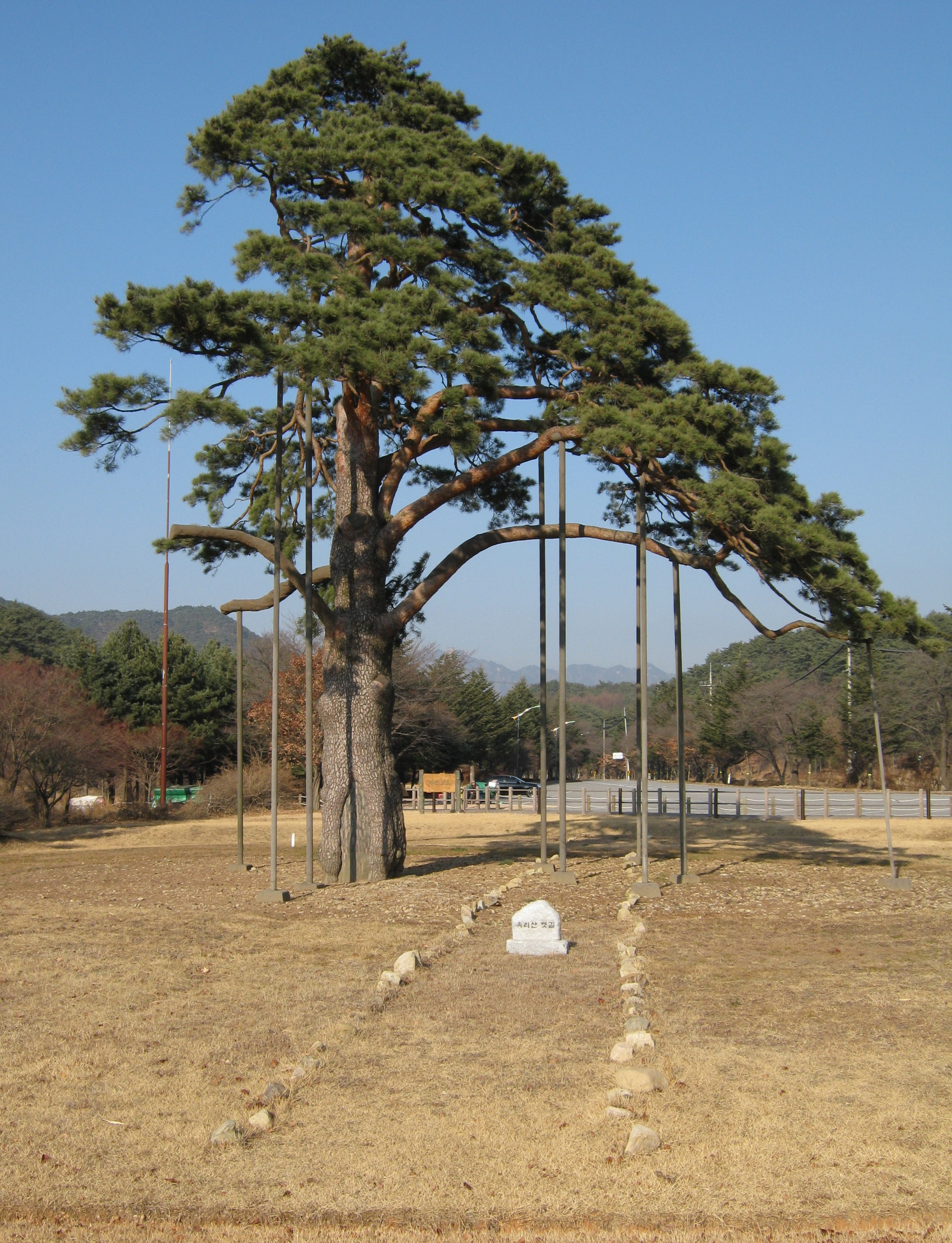
Jeongipumsong.

The park's most popular attraction is Beopjusa. It is one of Korea's largest Buddhist temples and was initially constructed in 553. They can also visit Jeongipumsong (정이품송), a pine tree known for having been awarded a political title by King Sejo in a famous folk tale.

Songnisan is home to a diverse set of wildlife, including mandarin ducks, otters, small-eared cats, martens, and black woodpeckers. Additionally, two endangered species live in the park - the Siberian flying squirrel and the Korean Berchemia, or buckthorn tree. Visitors who want to explore more of the park's scenery can hike along one of its many trails.
