= Jirisan (Tongyeong) =

Mountain of Gyeongsangnam-do, southeastern South Korea

Coordinates: 34°51′06″N 128°11′49″E

Highest point
- Elevation: 398 m (1,306 ft)

Geography
- Location: South Gyeongsang Province, South Korea

Jirisan is a mountain of South Gyeongsang Province, southeastern South Korea. It has an elevation of 398 metres.

== See also ==
- List of mountains of Korea
