= Naejangsan National Park =

Korea national park

- 내장산국립공원, 內藏山國立公園
- IUCN category II (national park)
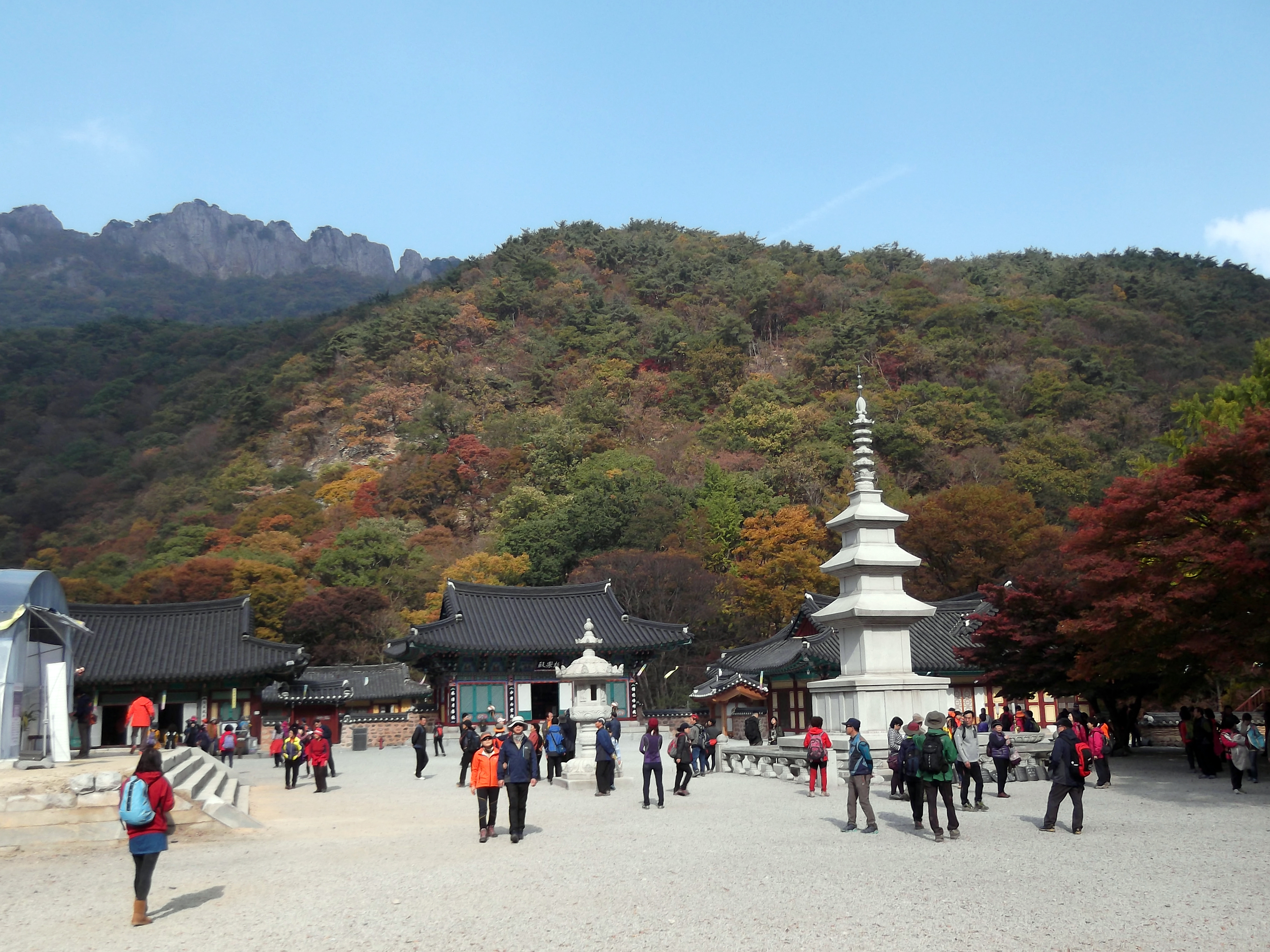
- Interactive map of Naejangsan National Park
- Coordinates: 35°25′55″N 126°53′46″E
- Area: 81.45 km^{2} (31.45 sq mi)
- Established: 17 November 1971
- Governing body: Korea National Park Service
- Website: english.knps.or.kr/Knp/Naejangsan/Intro/Introduction.aspx

The twenty-two national parks of South Korea.
Land-based parks are in red and marine parks are in blue.

Naejangsan National Park (Korean: 내장산국립공원; Hanja: 內藏山國立公園) is located in North Jeolla Province and Jeonnam-Gwangju, South Korea. It was designated as the 8th national park in 1971. It is named after the 763-metre (2,503 ft) mountain Naejangsan. The park is home to a total of 919 plant species and 1,880 animal species. 12 of the animals are endangered.
