= Gyeryongsan National Park =

National park in South Korea

- 계룡산국립공원, 鷄龍山國立公園
- IUCN category II (national park)
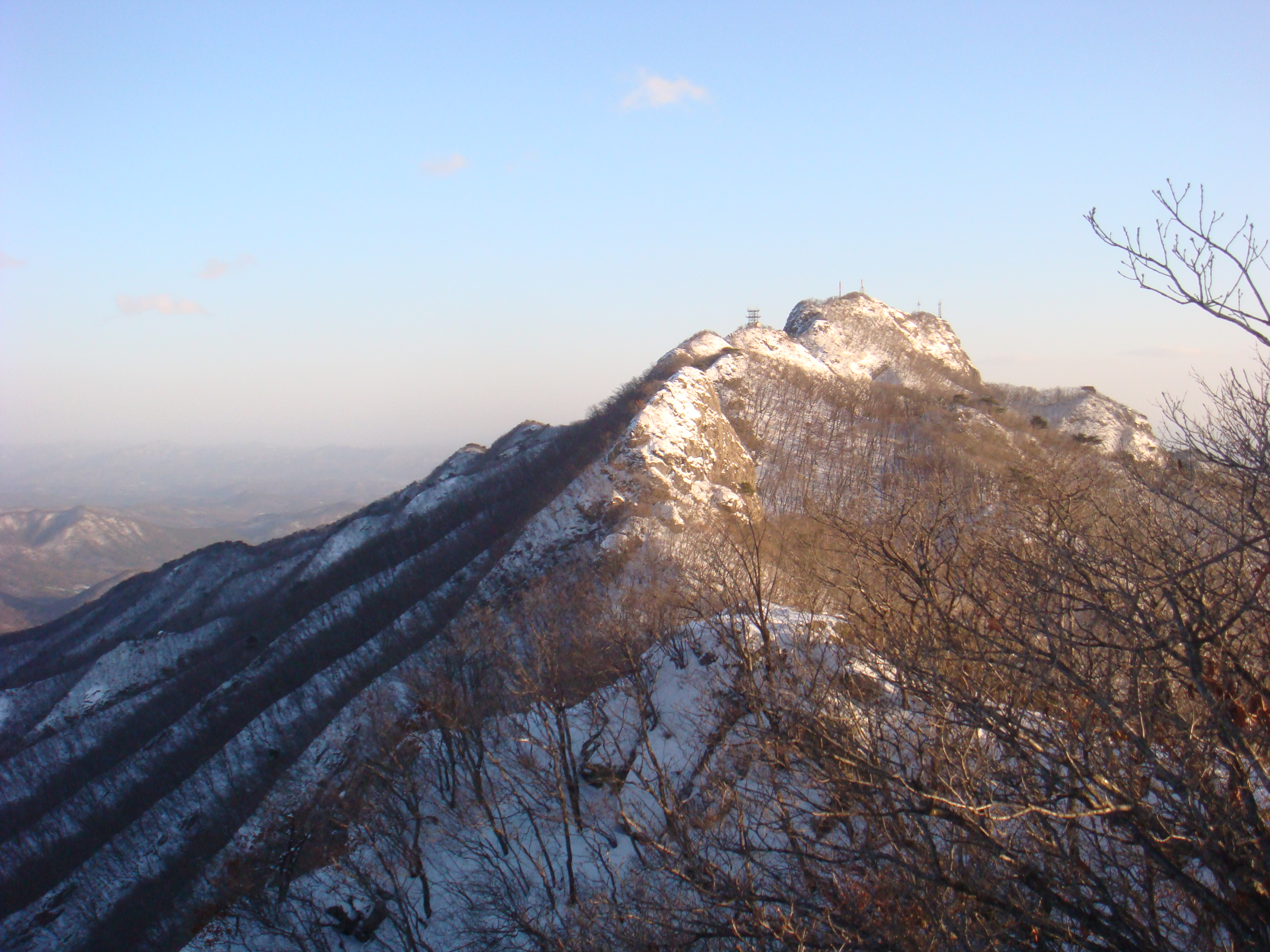
- View of the mountain Gyeryongsan
- Interactive map of Gyeryongsan National Park
- Location: Chungcheongnam-do, South Korea
- Nearest city: Daejeon
- Coordinates: 36.361°N 127.211°E
- Area: 64.71 km^{2} (24.98 sq mi)
- Established: 31 December 1968
- Governing body: Korea National Park Service
- Website: english.knps.or.kr/Knp/Gyeryongsan/Intro/Introduction.aspx

The twenty-two national parks of South Korea.
Land-based parks are in red and marine parks are in blue.

Gyeryongsan National Park (Korean: 계룡산국립공원) is one of 20 national parks in South Korea. It was designated as a national park in 1968, as the second park in the country. It covers an area of 64.71 km^{2} (24.98 sq mi). One part of Gyeryongsan, a 845-metre-high (2,772 ft) mountain, is located in the park.

The park is home to a total of 1,121 plant species, 1,867 insect species and 645 animal species. Among the animals eleven are endangered, including Otter, Marten, Common buzzard, and Black woodpecker.

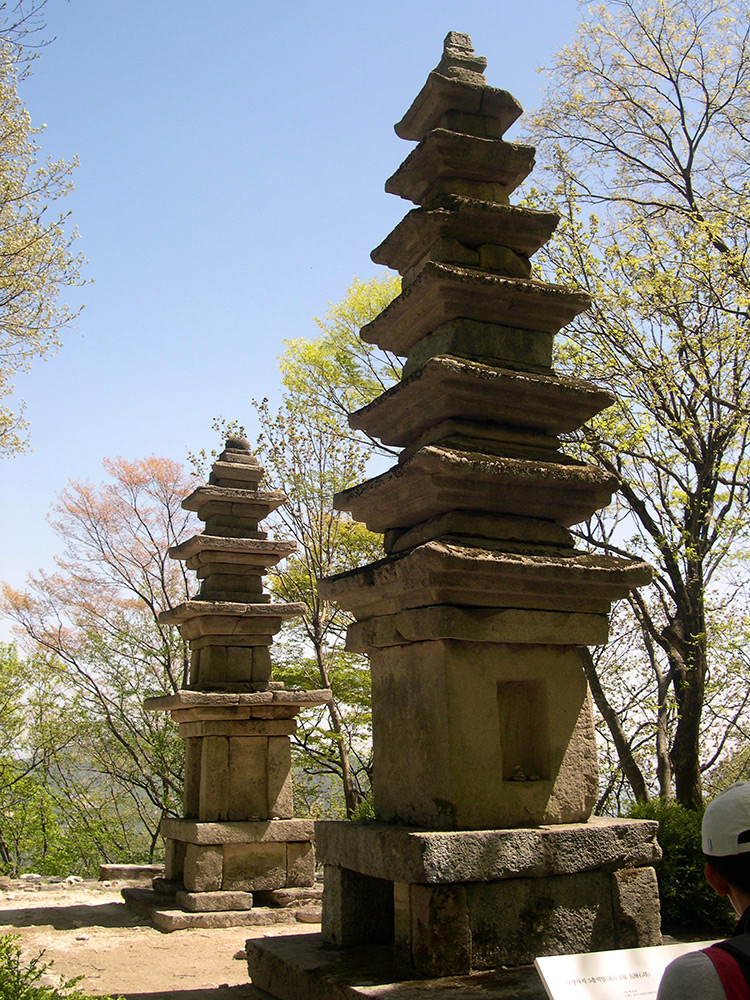
Seoktap near Gapsa Temple, Gyeryeongsang Park
