= Chiaksan National Park =

National Park in South Korea

치악산국립공원, 雉岳山國立公園
- Chiaksan National Park
- IUCN category II (national park)
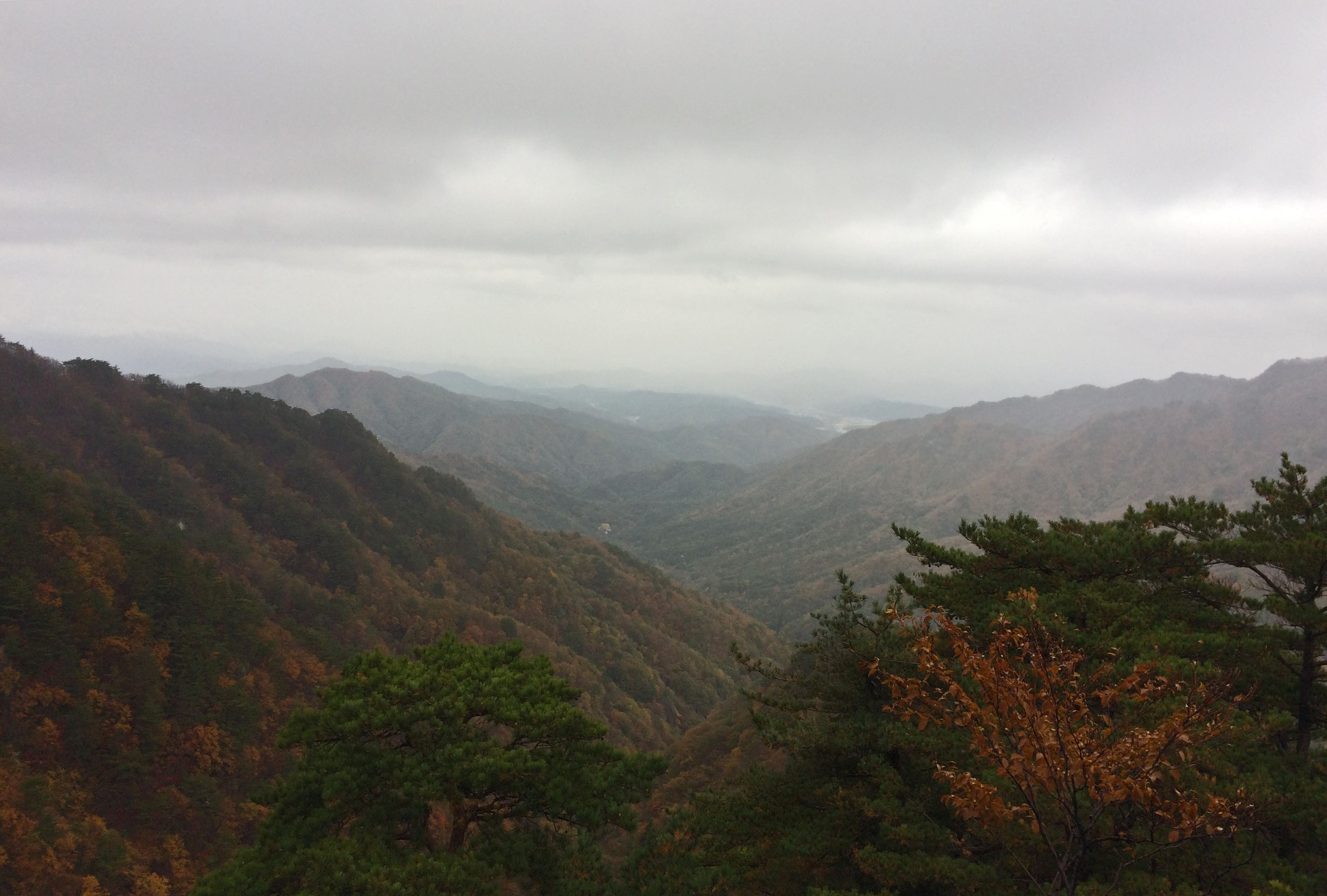
- Interactive map of 치악산국립공원, 雉岳山國立公園
- Location: Gangwon-do, South Korea
- Nearest city: Wonju
- Coordinates: 37.330°N 128.047°E
- Area: 181.57 km^{2} (70.10 sq mi)
- Established: 31 December 1984
- Governing body: Korea National Park Service

The twenty-two national parks of South Korea.
Land-based parks are in red and marine parks are in blue.

Chiaksan National Park (Korean: 치악산국립공원; Hanja: 雉岳山國立公園) is located in the province of Gangwon-do, South Korea. It was designated as the 16th national park in 1984. The park is named after the 1,288-metre (4,226 ft) mountain Chiaksan, which in turn had its name changed from Jeokakasan to Chiaksan, meaning "Pheasant Peak Mountain", based on a myth about a man who saved a pheasant from being eaten by a snake. The park is home to a total of 821 plant species and 2,364 animal species. Among the animals 34 are endangered, including the Flying squirrel and Hodgson's Bat.
