= Hallasan National Park =

National park in Jeju, South Korea

한라산국립공원, 漢拏山國立公園
- Hallasan National Park
- IUCN category II (national park)
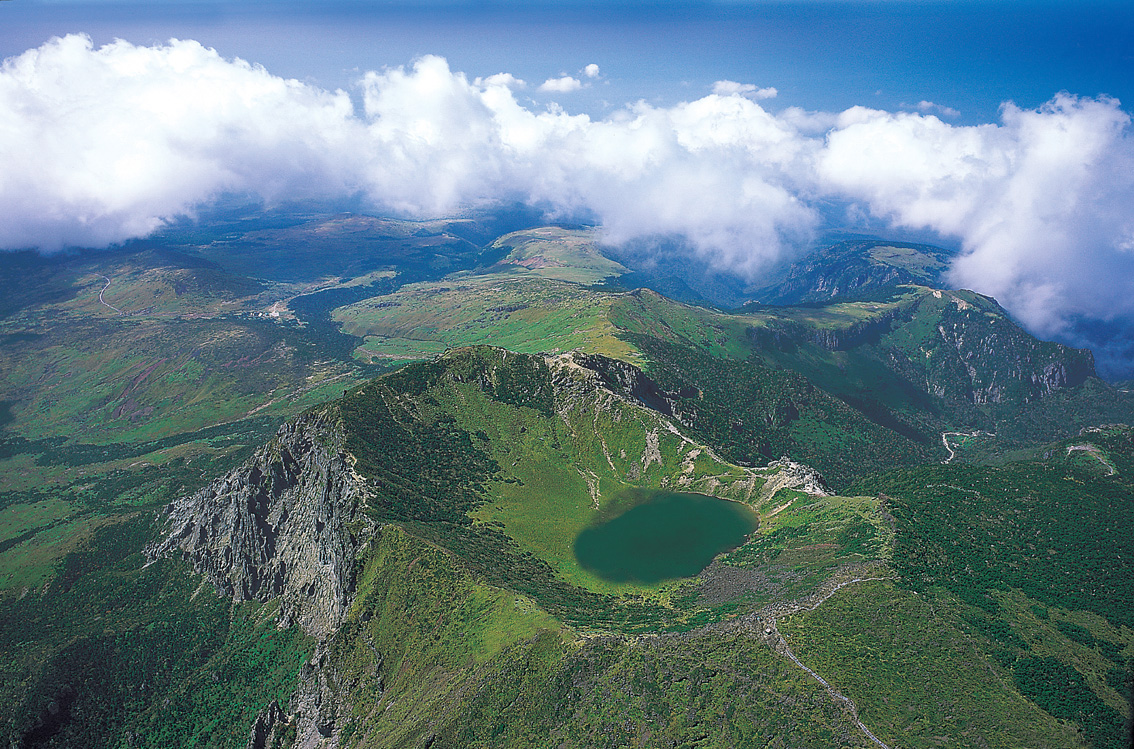
- View of Hallasan and its surrounding park from above (2011)
- Interactive map of 한라산국립공원, 漢拏山國立公園
- Coordinates: 33°22′N 126°32′E
- Area: 153.11 km^{2} (59.12 sq mi)
- Established: 24 March 1970
- Governing body: Jeju Province
- Website: jeju.go.kr/hallasan/index.htm

UNESCO World Heritage Site
- Part of: Jeju Volcanic Island and Lava Tubes
- Criteria: Natural: (vii), (viii)
- Reference: 1264
- Inscription: 2007 (31st Session)

The twenty-two national parks of South Korea.
Land-based parks are in red and marine parks are in blue.

Hallasan National Park (Korean: 한라산국립공원; Hanja: 漢拏山國立公園) is located on and around the mountain Hallasan in Jeju Province, South Korea. It was designated as the 9th national park in 1970.

Hallasan is a shield volcano that is the highest mountain in South Korea. It was designated a UNESCO Biosphere Reserve in 2002, and a World Heritage Site in 2007.

The park is managed by Jeju Special Self-Governing Province. It is the only out of 22 national parks that is not managed by the Korea National Park Service.

== Trails ==
Hallasan has 7 trails: Eorimok Trail (6.8 km), Yeongsil Trail (5.8 km), Seongpanak Trail (9.6 km), Seokgulam Trail (1.5 km), Gwaneumsa Trail (8.7 km), Donnaeko Trail (7 km), and Eoseungsaengak Trail (1.3 km). The longest trail is Seongpanak Trail which takes about 4.5 hours.

- Eorimok Trail (어리목 탐방로; 6.8 km): Eorimok Trail Starts from Hallasan National Park's Visitors center (altitude 970 m) and finishes at the South cliff junction (altitude 1,600 m). It takes about 3 hours for a one way trip.
- Yeongsil Trail (영실 탐방로; 5.8 km): Yeongsill Trail starts from Yeongsil Management Office (altitude 1,000 m) to South cliff junction. It takes about 3 hours 15 minutes for a one way trip.
- Seongpanak Trail (성판악 탐방로; 9.6 km): Seongpanak Trail starts from visitor center to Hallasan Baengnokdam Lake Summit. It takes about 4.5 hours for a one way trip.
- Seokgulam Trail (석굴암 탐방로; 1.5 km)
- Gwaneumsa Trail (관음사 탐방로; 8.7 km): Gwaneumsa Trail starts from Gwaneumsa Campground to Hallasan Baengnokdam Lake Summit. It takes 5 hours for a one way trip.
- Donnaeko Trail (돈내코 탐방로; 7 km): Donnaeko Trail starts from the Visitor Center(altitude 500m) to the South Cliff Junction. It takes 3.5 hours for a one way trip.
- Eoseungsaengak Trail (어승생악 탐방로; 1.3 km): Eoseungsaengak Trail starts from Hallasan National Park Visitor Center to Eoseungsaeng-oreum Summit. It takes 30 minutes for a one way trip.

== Topography ==
Hallasan comprises 153.112 km^{2} of Jeju Island. It rises 1,950 m above sea level, which means that it is the highest mountain in South Korea. This mountain was formed in the fourth Cenozoic era by the eruption of a volcano. It is mostly composed of basalts. It extends east and west, and it has high and gradual ascent. On the other hand, the south part of the mountain is steep. In the summit, there is a crater lake called "Baekrokdam".

Since the mountain has high altitude, there are a number of alpine plants and animals. 1,800 kinds of plants, including 400 kinds of specimen plants and 50 kinds of special plants, exist in Hallasan. Jeju island was designated as a Biosphere Reserve in 2002 and Hallasan National Park is one of the regions of Jeju Biosphere.
