= List of national parks of South Korea =

The twenty-two national parks of South Korea.
Land-based parks are in red and marine parks are in blue.

The national parks of South Korea are preserved parcels of public land on which most forms of development are prohibited. They cover a total of 6.6% of the country's area, and are typically located in mountainous or coastal regions. The country's largest mountain park is Jirisan National Park in the southwest; this was also the first national park to be designated in 1967. The largest marine park is Dadohaehaesang, with an area of more than 2,200 km^{2} (850 sq mi), but almost all of this is water. The smallest park is Wolchulsan, with an area of only 56.1 km^{2} (21.7 sq mi).

As of 2023, there are 23 national parks in South Korea; the parks, with the exception of Hallasan National Park, are managed by the Korea National Park Service, established in 1987. The Authority operates its own police force, and since 1998 has been under the jurisdiction of the Ministry of Environment. It was previously under the jurisdiction of the Ministry of Construction.

== History ==
Early on, admission to national parks in South Korea was free. In 1974, most of South Korea's national parks cancelled the free admission policy. Currently only Gyeongju National Park is free. In 1993, the ticket revenue of the Korean National Park accounted for 65% of the park's total revenue. With the increase in the number of tourists year by year, the Korean government has restricted the number of tourists and activities in order to effectively protect the natural environment of the park, and controlled the number of tourists through an appointment system. Picnic and camping for tourists can only be carried out in designated areas, and night climbing is strictly prohibited. In addition, South Korea has imposed a natural rest program on some areas of high conservation value in national parks to avoid man-made damage.

Mountainous national parks (17)
Marine & coastal national parks (4)
Historical national park (1)

| Name (English, hangul, hanja) | Photo | Location | Designated | Area | Land type |
|---|---|---|---|---|---|
| Bukhansan 북한산국립공원 北漢山國立公園 | | Seoul, Gyeonggi | 1983 | 80 km^{2} (31 sq mi) | Mountainous |
| Byeonsan-bando 변산반도국립공원 邊山半島國立公園 | | North Jeolla | 1988 | 155 km^{2} (60 sq mi) | Marine and coastal |
| Chiaksan 치악산국립공원 雉岳山國立公園 | | Gangwon | 1984 | 182 km^{2} (70 sq mi) | Mountainous |
| Dadohaehaesang 다도해해상국립공원 多島海海上國立公園 | | South Jeolla | 1981 | 2,325 km^{2} (898 sq mi) | Marine and coastal |
| Deogyusan 덕유산국립공원 德裕山國立公園 | | North Jeolla, South Gyeongsang | 1975 | 232 km^{2} (90 sq mi) | Mountainous |
| Gayasan 가야산국립공원 伽倻山國立公園 | | South Gyeongsang, North Gyeongsang | 1972 | 77 km^{2} (30 sq mi) | Mountainous |
| Gyeongju 경주국립공원 慶州國立公園 | | North Gyeongsang | 1968 | 137 km^{2} (53 sq mi) | Historical |
| Gyeryongsan 계룡산국립공원 鷄龍山國立公園 | | South Chungcheong, Daejeon | 1968 | 65 km^{2} (25 sq mi) | Mountainous |
| Hallasan 한라산국립공원 漢拏山國立公園 | | Jeju | 1970 | 153 km^{2} (59 sq mi) | Mountainous |
| Hallyeohaesang 한려해상국립공원 閑麗海上國立公園 | | South Jeolla, South Gyeongsang | 1968 | 545 km^{2} (210 sq mi) | Marine and coastal |
| Jirisan 지리산국립공원 智異山國立公園 | | South Jeolla, North Jeolla, South Gyeongsang | 1967 | 472 km^{2} (182 sq mi) | Mountainous |
| Juwangsan 주왕산국립공원 周王山國立公園 | | North Gyeongsang | 1976 | 107 km^{2} (41 sq mi) | Mountainous |
| Naejangsan 내장산국립공원 內藏山國立公園 | | South Jeolla, North Jeolla | 1971 | 81 km^{2} (31 sq mi) | Mountainous |
| Odaesan 오대산국립공원 五臺山國立公園 | | Gangwon | 1975 | 304 km^{2} (117 sq mi) | Mountainous |
| Seoraksan 설악산국립공원 雪嶽山國立公園 | | Gangwon | 1970 | 398 km^{2} (154 sq mi) | Mountainous |
| Sobaeksan 소백산국립공원 小白山國立公園 | | North Chungcheong, North Gyeongsang | 1987 | 322 km^{2} (124 sq mi) | Mountainous |
| Songnisan 속리산국립공원 俗離山國立公園 | | North Chungcheong, North Gyeongsang | 1970 | 274 km^{2} (106 sq mi) | Mountainous |
| Taeanhaean 태안해안국립공원 泰安海岸國立公園 | | South Chungcheong | 1978 | 326 km^{2} (126 sq mi) | Marine and coastal |
| Wolchulsan 월출산국립공원 月出山國立公園 | | South Jeolla | 1988 | 56 km^{2} (22 sq mi) | Mountainous |
| Woraksan 월악산국립공원 月岳山國立公園 | | North Chungcheong, North Gyeongsang | 1984 | 288 km^{2} (111 sq mi) | Mountainous |
| Mudeungsan 무등산국립공원 無等山國立公園 | | Gwangju, South Jeolla | 2012 | 75 km^{2} (29 sq mi) | Mountainous |
| Taebaeksan 태백산국립공원 太白山國立公園 | | Yeongwol, Jeongseon, Taebaek, Gangwon; Bonghwa, North Gyeongsang | 2016 | 70 km^{2} (27 sq mi) | Mountainous |
| Palgongsan 팔공산국립공원 八公山國立公園 | | Daegu, North Gyeongsang | 2023 | 126 km^{2} (49 sq mi) | Mountainous |
