= Byeonsan-bando National Park =

National park in South Korea

- 변산반도국립공원, 邊山半島國立公園
- IUCN category II (national park)
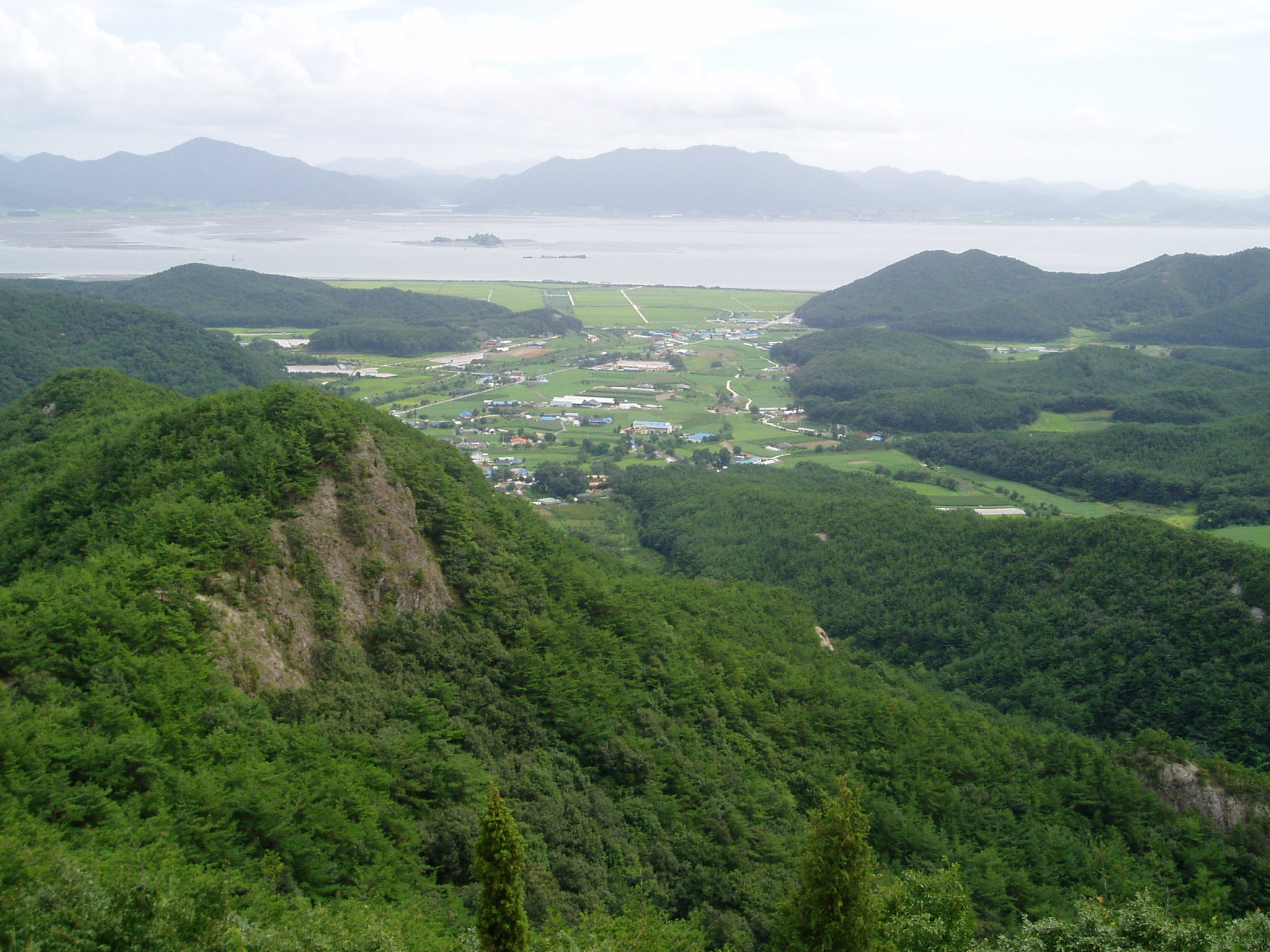
- Interactive map of Byeonsan-bando National Park
- Location: Jeollabuk-do, South Korea
- Coordinates: 35.644°N 126.586°E
- Area: 154.71 km^{2} (59.73 sq mi)
- Established: 11 June 1988
- Governing body: Korea National Park Service
- Website: english.knps.or.kr/Knp/Byeonsanbando/Intro/Introduction.aspx

The twenty-two national parks of South Korea.
Land-based parks are in red and marine parks are in blue.

Byeonsan-bando National Park (Korean: 변산반도국립공원; Hanja: 邊山半島國立公園) is a national park in South Korea and was designated in 1988 as the only peninsula based park with a mix of mountains and sea in the country. The total area is 154.71 km^{2} (59.73 sq mi) with 9.27 km^{2} (3.58 sq mi) being sea. Byeonsan-bando is divided into two parts which are the Naebyeonsan (mountain area) and the Oebyeonsan (coastal area). There are 996 animal species and 877 different vascular plants within national park.
