= Jirisan National Park =

National park in South Korea

- 지리산국립공원, 智異山國立公園
- IUCN category II (national park)
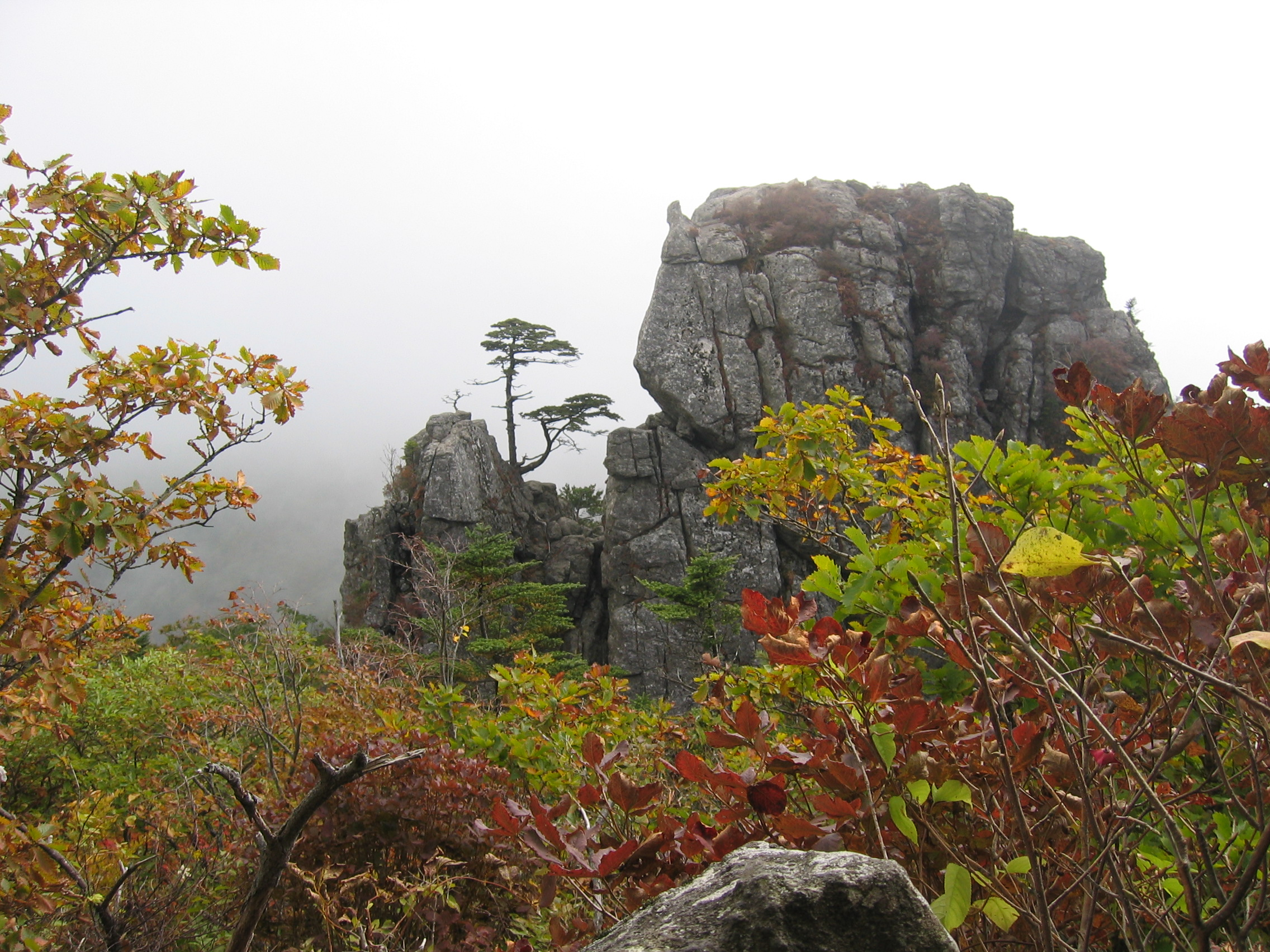
- Interactive map of Jirisan National Park
- Location: Jeollanam-do, Jeollabuk-do, Gyeongsangnam-do, South Korea
- Nearest city: Gurye
- Coordinates: 35.29°N 127.632°E
- Area: 471.75 km^{2} (182.14 sq mi)
- Established: 29 December 1967
- Visitors: 1.5 million
- Governing body: Korea National Park Service
- Website: english.knps.or.kr/Knp/Jirisan/Intro/Introduction.aspx

The twenty-two national parks of South Korea.
Land-based parks are in red and marine parks are in blue.

Jirisan National Park (Korean: 지리산국립공원; Hanja: 智異山國立公園) is a national park in South Korea, located on the boundaries of Jeollanam-do, Jeollabuk-do, and Gyeongsangnam-do. It is also located bordering the towns of Namwon, Gurye, and Hamyang. Jirisan was the first park to be designated as a national park in South Korea, in 1967. It is also the largest terrestrial national park in the country with an emphasis on biodiversity conservation, a well-known conservation programme on the Asiatic black bear and a pioneering restoration programme on damaged areas by overuse.

Jirisan National Park

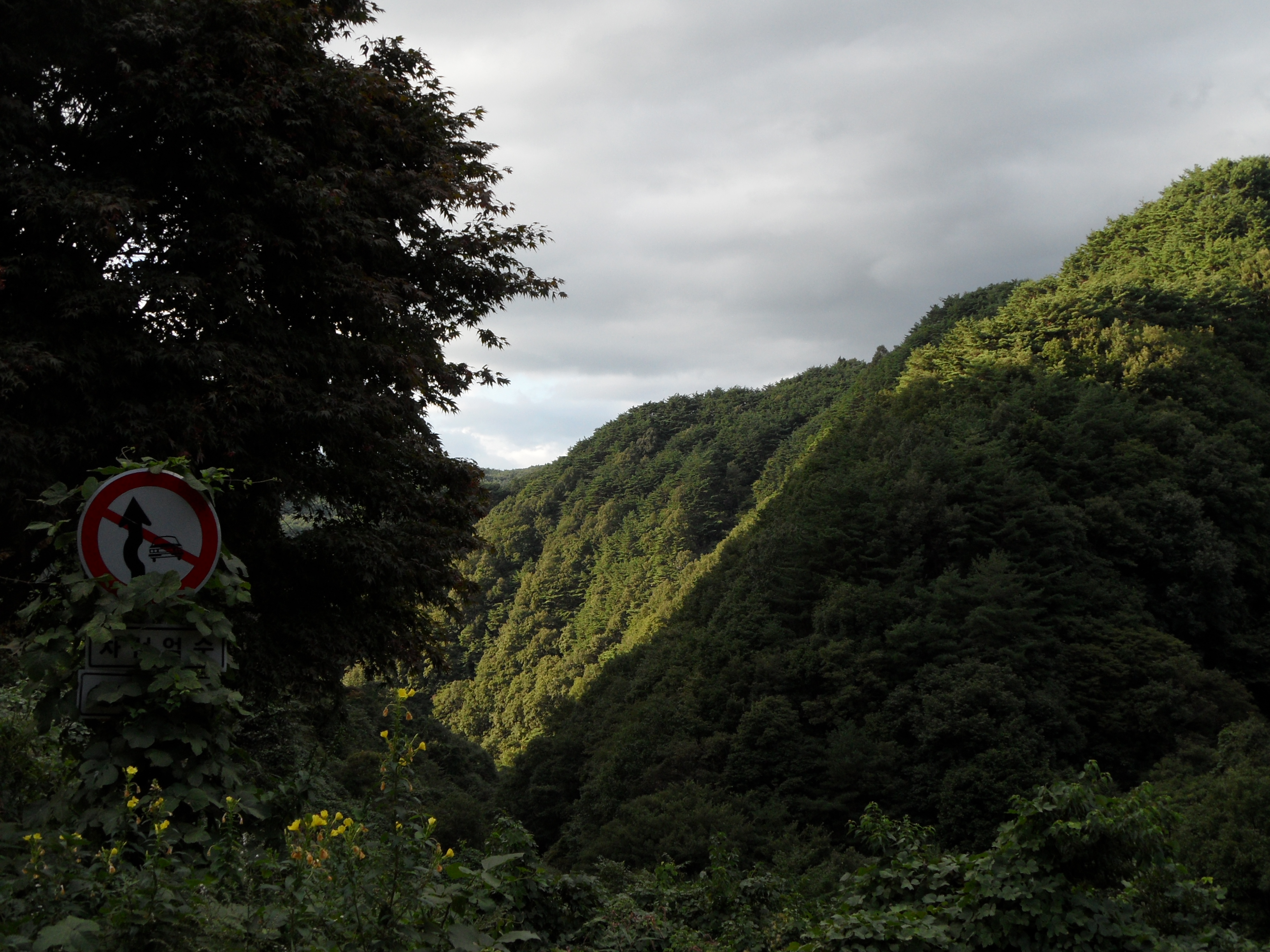
Namwon Countryside - Jirisan National Park (2010)

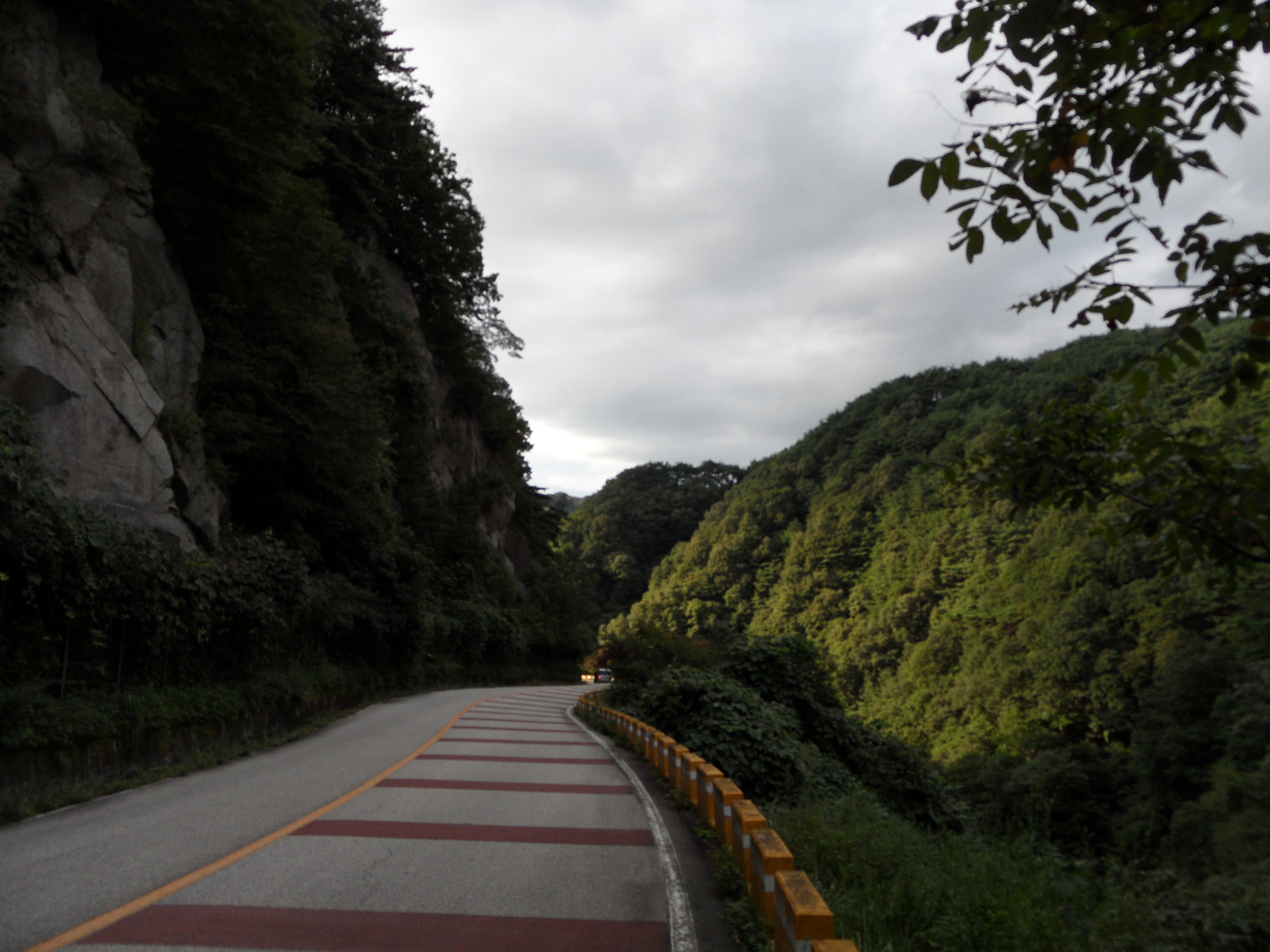
Namwon Countryside - Jirisan National Park (2010)

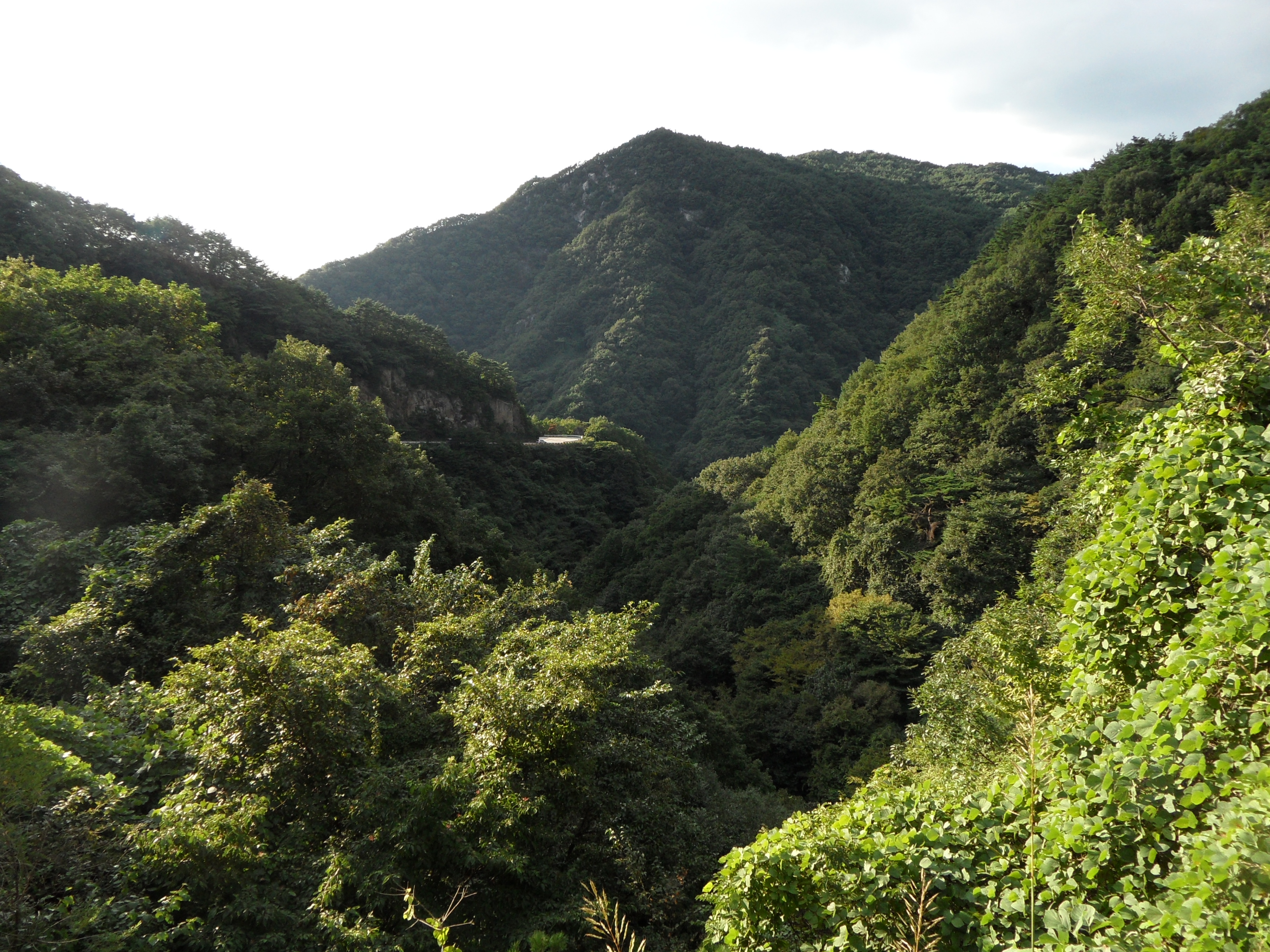
Namwon Countryside - Jirisan National Park (2010)
Jirisan National Park from the outskirts: Namwon side

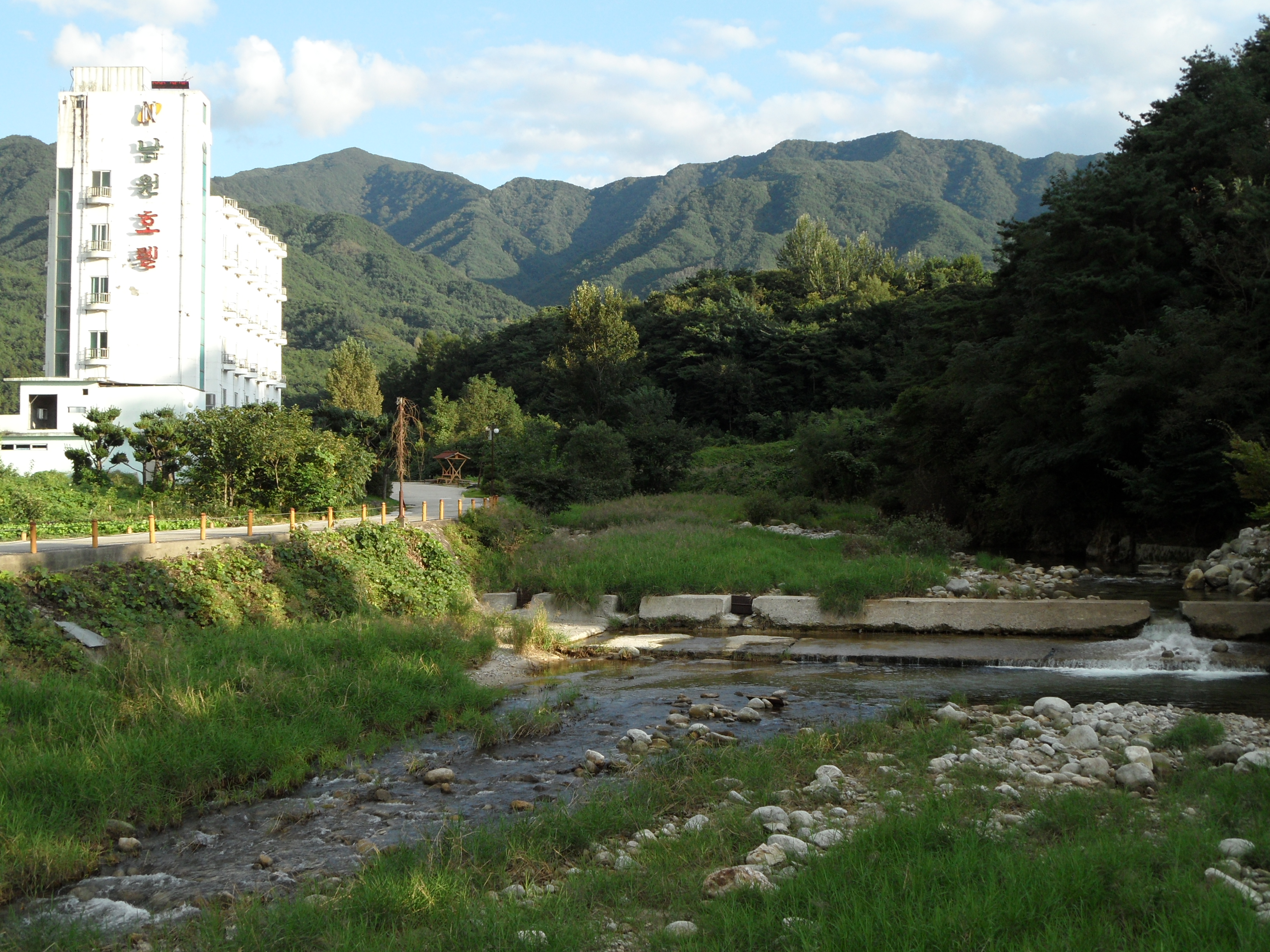
Namwon Countryside - (주천면) Jucheon Myeon (2010)

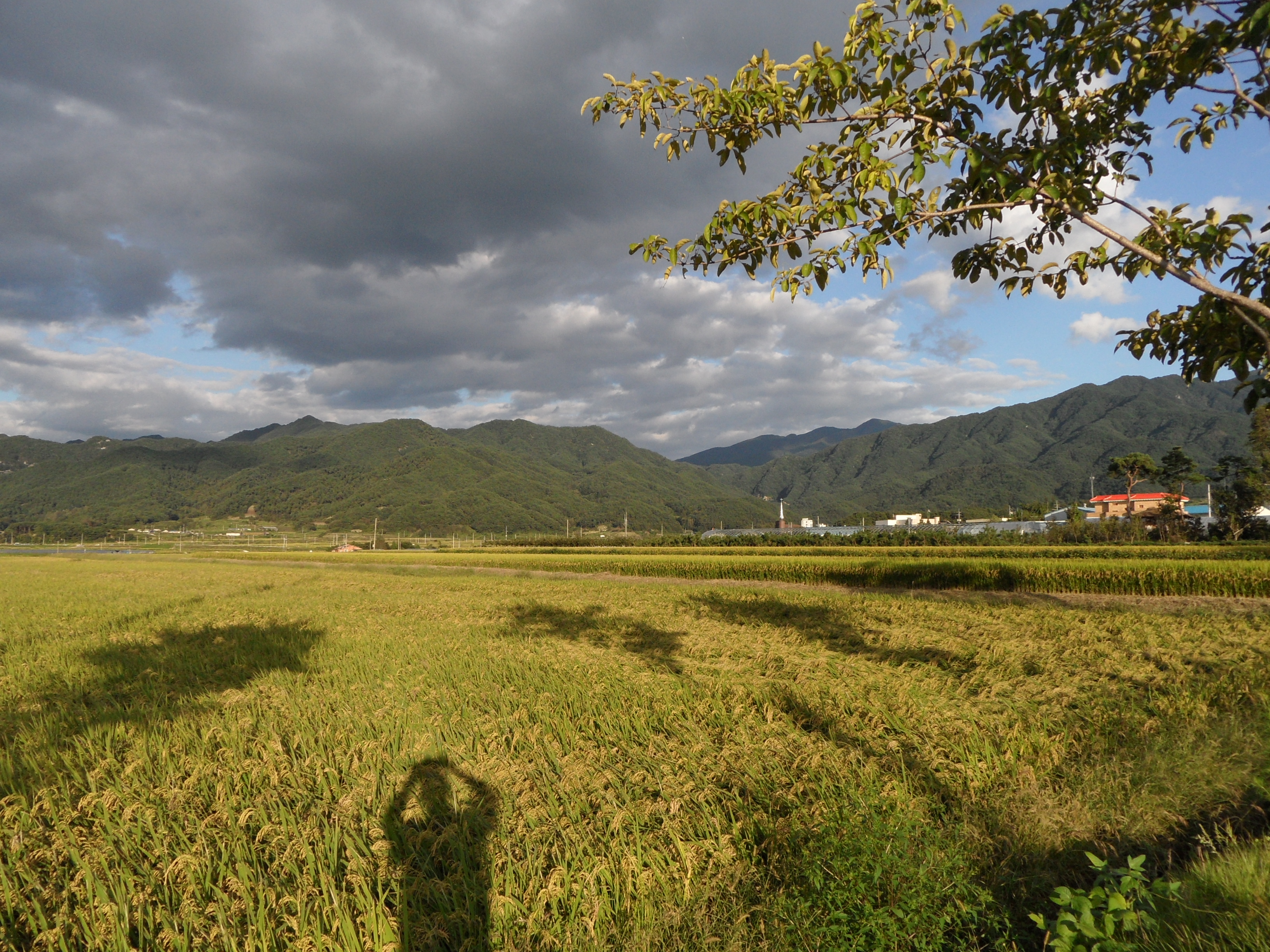
Namwon Countryside - (주천면) Jucheon Myeon (2010)

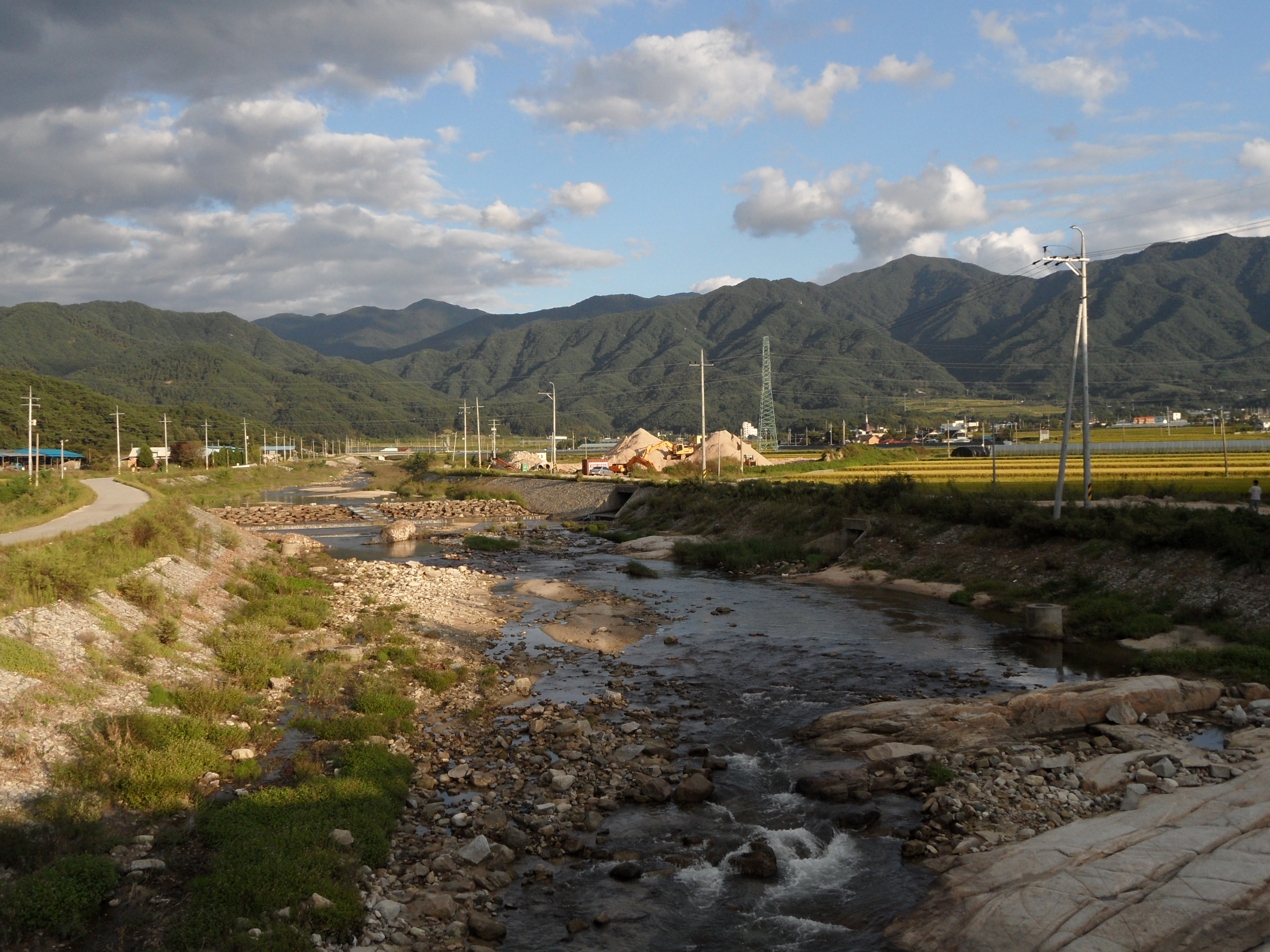
Namwon Countryside - (주천면) Jucheon Myeon (2010)
