= Paljoryeong =

Mountain pass in South Korea

Coordinates: 35.7210°N 128.6780°E

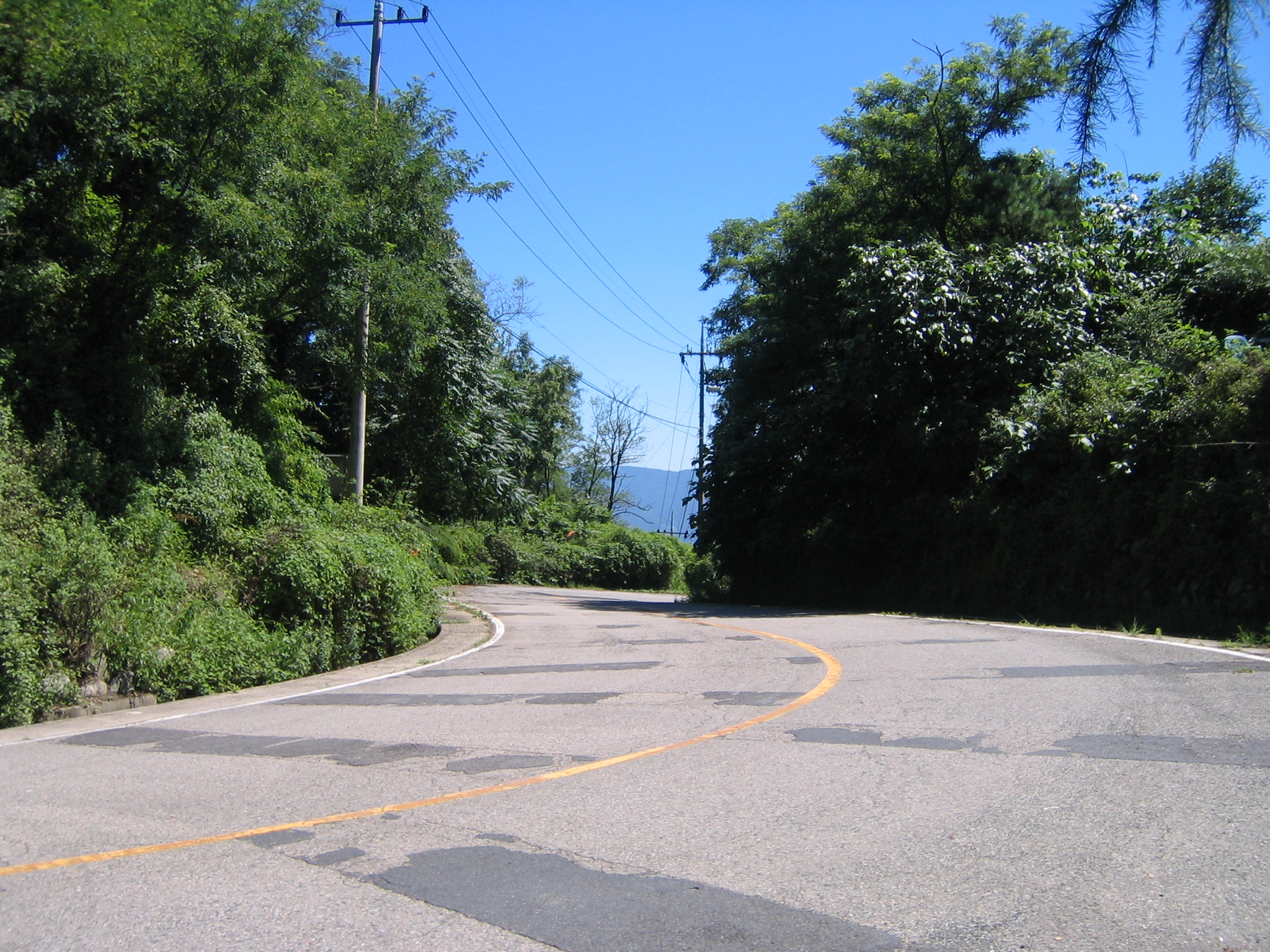
- Road south into Cheongdo from Paljoryeong.

Korean name
- Hangul: 팔조령
- Hanja: 八助嶺
- RR: Paljoryeong
- MR: P'alchoryŏng

Paljoryeong is a mountain pass in southeastern South Korea, lying between the peaks of Bonghwasan and Sangwonsan, which are both slightly over 660 meters high. The pass itself is slightly less than 400 metres (1,300 ft) above sea level. It lies on the border of modern-day Daegu metropolitan city and Cheongdo, Gyeongsangbuk-do province. At one time it was the major overland route between Daegu and the region to its south. The north side of the pass is in Daegu, in Gachang-myeon, Dalseong-gun. The south side is in Cheongdo's Iseo-myeon.

During the later Joseon Dynasty, the Great Yeongnam Road crossed over Paljoryeong, on its way from Seoul to Busan. Paljoryeong was the highest point on the route between Mungyeong Saejae and Busan. With the construction of the Gyeongbu Line railroad in the early 20th century, this route fell out of use. Today, most traffic crossing Paljoryeong goes underground through the Paljoryeong Tunnel on Local Highway 30. However, a two-lane road still carries tourists over the top of the pass.

Both sides of the pass ultimately drain into the Nakdong River. Water flowing north from Paljoryeong enters a stream called the Naengcheon, a "cold stream," so named because of the cold mountain water. This goes on to join the Sincheon, which flows through the central Daegu to join the Geumho River and then the Nakdong. Water flowing south eventually joins the Nakdong via the Miryang River, passing first through the Daegokcheon which joins the Cheongdocheon in Iseo and finally meets the Miryang River in Sangdong-myeon.

== See also ==
- List of mountain passes
