= Arang (Korean folklore) =

Mythological figure

- Hangul: 아랑
- Hanja: 阿娘
- RR: Arang
- MR: Arang

Arang (Korean: 아랑) is a figure in the folklore of the Miryang area of Korea. According to the legend, she was the daughter of a magistrate (busa) of Miryang during the Joseon Dynasty. Her wicked nanny conspired to have the servant Baekga seize her at night and rape her; however, she resisted and Baekga stabbed her to death. Her father, thinking she had eloped with a stranger, resigned his position in shame. Thereafter, whenever a new magistrate was appointed Arang's spirit would appear before him to seek his help in getting justice and eventually no one wanted to take the position out of fear. At last a bold man named Yi Sang-sa was appointed to the post, and he promised Arang's spirit that he would avenge her. He had Baekga arrested and executed. Thereafter, her spirit ceased to trouble the town.

The Aranggak shrine, where Arang's spirit is venerated, still stands in Miryang, on the Yeongnamnu bluff overlooking the Miryang River.

== Fictional portrayals ==
- Arang, a 2006 film.
- Arang and the Magistrate, a 2012 television series.
