= Yeongnamnu =

Yeongnamnu or Yeongnamru can refer to two pavilions in South Korea:

- Yeongnamnu (Miryang), overlooking the Miryang River in Gyeongsangnam-do
- Yeongnamnu (Cheonan), near the Onyang Hot Springs in Chungcheongbuk-do
