= Yeongnam Alps =

Outlying range of the Taebaek mountains

Coordinates: 35.59°N 128.93°E

- Hangul: 영남알프스
- Hanja: 嶺南알프스
- RR: Yeongnam alpeuseu
- MR: Yŏngnam alp'ŭsŭ

Yeongnam Mountains in summer

The Yeongnam Alps are an outlying range of the Taebaek Mountains. They consist of a group of relatively tall mountains in the Yeongnam region of southeastern South Korea. They are much smaller than the European Alps, only slightly over 1000 m. The term is sometimes restricted to those peaks exceeding 1000 m in height, but may be informally extended to lower peaks in the same region.

The Yeongnam Alps cover a small region at the meeting of South Gyeongsang Province, North Gyeongsang Province, and Ulsan. The Gyeongnam side is in Sannae-myeon, Miryang; the Gyeongbuk side is in Unmun-myeon, Cheongdo; and the Ulsan side lies in Sangbuk-myeon, Ulju County.

The area is a popular attraction for South Korean domestic tourism. This is due both to the mountain scenery and to the numerous landmarks in the region. These include the temples such as Tongdosa and Pyochungsa, the "ice valley" Eoreumgol, various waterfalls and hot springs.

== List of peaks ==
- Gajisan, 1241 m
- Cheonhwangsan (also called Jaeyaksan), 1189 m
- Unmunsan, 1188 m
- Sinbulsan, 1159 m
- Jaeyaksan, 1119 m
- Yeongchuksan (also called Yeongchwisan, Chwiseosan and Chukseosan), 1081 m
- Ganwolsan, 1069 m
- Goheonsan, 1033 m
- Munboksan, 1015 m

== See also ==
- List of Korean mountains
