= Cheontaesan (South Gyeongsang) =

Mountain in South Korea

Highest point
- Elevation: 631 m (2,070 ft)

Geography
- Location: South Gyeongsang Province, South Korea

Korean name
- Hangul: 천태산
- Hanja: 天台山
- RR: Cheontaesan
- MR: Ch'ŏnt'aesan

Cheontaesan (Korean: 천태산) is a 631-meter-high mountain in South Gyeongsang Province, South Korea, on the border between Miryang and Yangsan cities. It lies near the southern end of the Yeongnam Alps, and looks south across the Nakdong River to Gimhae. Cheontaesan is connected to Geumosan (730 m (2,400 ft)) to its north.

Tourists reach the mountain's southern flank on the local highway which crosses from Wondong-myeon in Yangsan to Samnangjin-eup in Miryang. There are numerous waterfalls on Cheontaesan. These include the Ungyeon waterfall, which lies on the southern flank just below the Cheontaeho reservoir. The Cheontaesa Buddhist temple is also located on the southern flank.

The name "Cheontaesan" comes from the Cheontae Buddhist order, which was established here in the 7th century.

== See also ==
- List of mountains in Korea
- Geography of South Korea
- Tourism in South Korea
