= Geumosan =

Geumosan may refer to:

- Geumosan (North Gyeongsang), a mountain in South Korea
- Geumosan (South Gyeongsang), a mountain in South Korea
- Geumosan (South Jeolla), a mountain in South Korea
