= Cheontaesan =

Cheontaesan can refer to:

- Cheontaesan (Chungcheong), a mountain in North Chungcheong and South Chungcheong Provinces, South Korea
- Cheontaesan (South Gyeongsang), a mountain in South Gyeongsang Province, South Korea
