= Nenjiang =

Nenjiang (Chinese: 嫩江) may refer to:

- Nen River, major tributary of the Songhua River in Heilongjiang, China
- Nenjiang City, city in Heilongjiang
  - Nenjiang Town, seat of Nenjiang City
  - Nenjiang Prefecture, former prefecture
- Nenjiang Province, former province in Northeast China
