= Pyochungsa =

Temple

Coordinates: 35°31′57″N 128°57′39″E

- Hangul: 표충사
- Hanja: 表忠寺
- RR: Pyochungsa
- MR: P'yoch'ungsa

Main Entrance to Pyochungsa Temple.

Pyochungsa, originally Jungnimsa, is a Korean Buddhist temple of the Jogye Order of Korean Buddhism. It stands on the slopes of Jaeyaksan mountain near Cheonhwangsan in the Yeongnam Alps in Danjang-myeon, northern Miryang, South Korea.

== History ==
Pyochungsa was first established by Wonhyo in 654 under the name "Jungnimsa." It was rebuilt at its present location by Hwangmyeon in 857, in the reign of the Silla king Heungdeok. In the Goryeo period, the National Preceptor Iryeon gathered more than a thousand monks there.

After Hideyoshi's invasions of Korea in the late 16th century, the temple was renamed "Pyochuongsa" (temple of fidelity displayed) in honor of Songun Yu Jeong, the monk who led various righteous armies against the Japanese. The Pyochuong Seowon, the only seowon located within the grounds of a Buddhist temple, was also constructed there in Songun's memory.

Due to its rich history and location in the Yeongnam Alps, Pyochungsa is a leading tourist attraction of Miryang. The temple is home to an incense burner which is designated National treasure of South Korea no. 75. In addition, the entire temple has been designated as Gyeongsangnam-do Provincial Monument 17.
