= Geumcheon =

Geumcheon (Korean: 금천; RR: Geumcheon; MR: Kŭmch'ŏn) is a Korean-language term that may refer to:

== Administrative divisions ==
- Geumcheon District in Seoul, South Korea
- Geumcheon-myeon, Cheongdo County in North Gyeongsang Province, South Korea
- Geumcheon-myeon, Naju in South Jeolla Province, South Korea
- Geumcheon-dong, name for various neighborhoods in South Korea
- Kumchon County in North Hwanghae Province, North Korea
- Siheung County in Gyeonggi Province, South Korea, which went by "Geumcheon" for much of the Joseon period

== Other ==
- Kŭmch'ŏn (palace streams), streams that passed through palaces in Korea
- Changdeokgung Geumcheongyo, a bridge in Changdeokgung in Seoul, South Korea
