= Sannae-myeon =

Sannae-myeon in South Korea may refer to:

- Sannae-myeon, Gyeongju in Gyeongsangbuk-do
- Sannae-myeon, Miryang in Gyeongsangnam-do
- Sannae-myeon, Jeongeup in Jeongeup in Jeollabuk-do
- Sannae-myeon, Namwon in Namwon in Jeollabuk-do

== See also ==
- List of townships in South Korea
