= Hyangnosan =

Mountain in South Korea

Highest point
- Elevation: 979 m (3,212 ft)
- Coordinates: 35°30′50″N 128°57′29″E

Geography
- Location: Miryang, South Korea

Korean name
- Hangul: 향로산
- Hanja: 향로山
- RR: Hyangnosan
- MR: Hyangnosan

Hyangnosan is a mountain located in Miryang, South Korea. It has an elevation of 979 m (3,212 ft).

== See also ==
- Geography of South Korea
- List of mountains in Korea
- List of mountains by elevation
