= Hanam (disambiguation) =

Hanam is a city in Gyeonggi Province, South Korea.

It could also refer to:

- Hanam Jungwon (1876–1951), Korean Buddhist monk
- Hanam-dong, neighborhood in Gwangsan, Gwangju, South Korea
- Hanam-eup, town in Miryang, South Gyeongsang, South Korea
