= Yerim Seowon =

Private Confucian academy in Gyeongsangnam-do

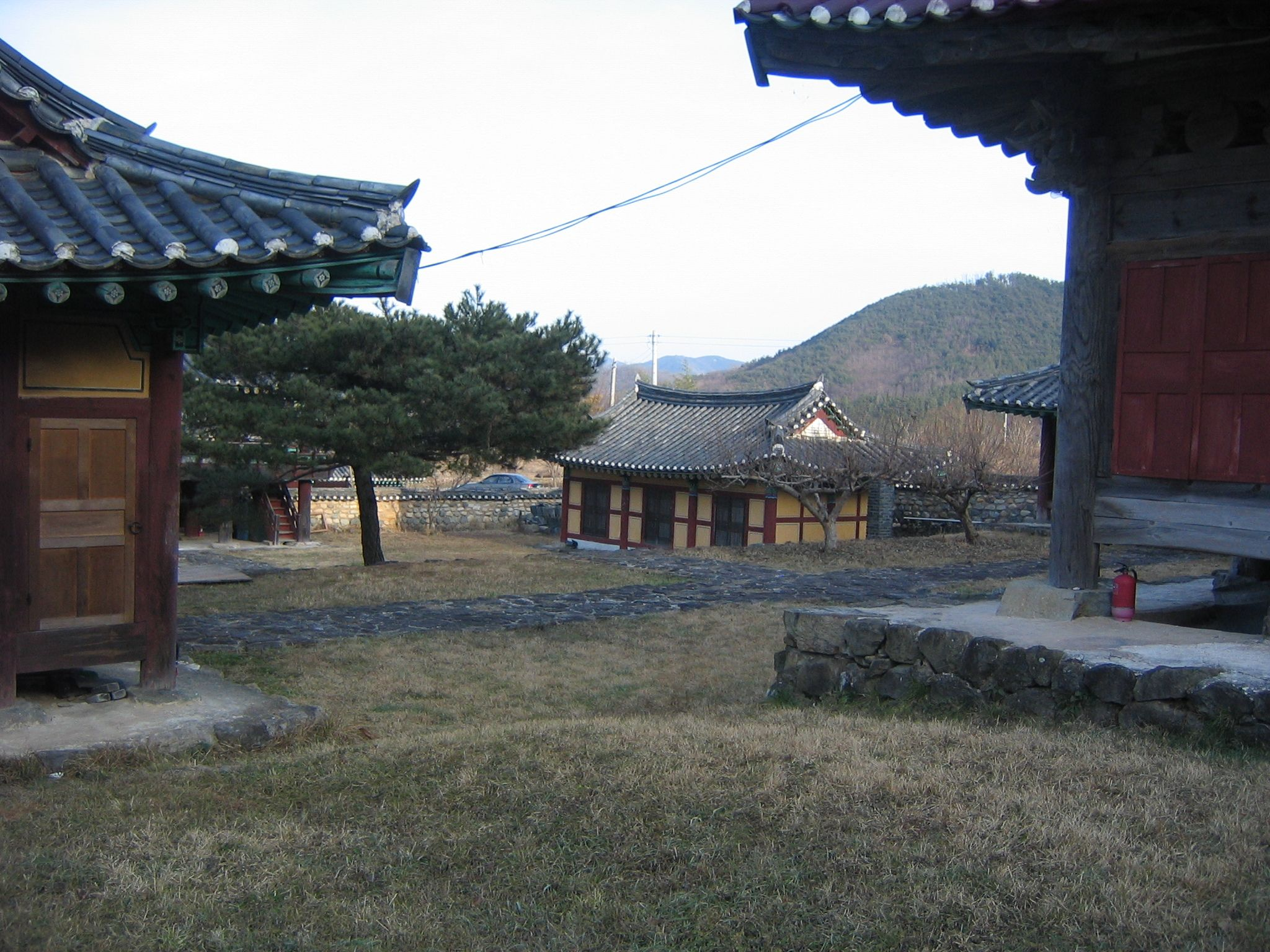
- View across the outer courtyard of Yerim Seowon

- Location within South Korea
- Coordinates: 35°27′58″N 128°43′47″E

- Yerim Seowon
- Hangul: 예림서원
- Hanja: 禮林書院
- RR: Yerim seowon
- MR: Yerim sŏwŏn

Yerim Seowon is a former seowon in Miryang, Gyeongsangnam-do. It is located in Bubuk-myeon on the slopes of Jongnamsan, in the valley of the Miryang River.

The Yerim Seowon was built in 1567 by Yi Do-u to enshrine Kim Chong-jik, a Confucian scholar and politician who was native to Miryang. At that time it bore the name "Deokseong Seowon." Destroyed during Hideyoshi's invasions of Korea in the 1590s, it was rebuilt in 1606. in 1634 it was relocated to its current location in Miryang-sa.

The seowon, like most of those across Korea, was demolished by order of the regent Daewon-gun in 1868 (1871). However, beginning in 1874, local scholars once again began to gather there, although it no longer served as a school. It continues in use as a shrine today, and was designated a tangible cultural treasure of Gyeongsangnam-do in 1974.
