= Yeomgeo =

Late Silla-era Korean Buddhist monk

Yeomgeo (Korean: 염거; Hanja: 廉居, ?–844) was a Korean Zen Buddhist monk during the late Silla. As the second great monk of the temple, he stayed at Gajisan mountain to boost the school of Gajisan. North South States Period great monk, Doui disciplined him.

Yeomgeo resided mainly in Eoksungsa Temple, Seoraksan, to encourage Zen Buddhism in Korea. Since Zen Buddhism at the moment was not widely accepted among Korean people, his discipline largely emphasized the inner mediation away from the pain, differing from the Buddhist mainstream. In his later life, he conveyed his seat to Chejing.

The stupa holding Śarīra of Yeomgeo still stands in the site of Heungbeopsa temple in Wonju, which South Korean authorities registered to be no.104 National Treasure.

== See also ==
- Korean Buddhism
- Doseon
