= Arang and the Magistrate =

South Korean historical television drama

- Promotional poster
- Also known as: Tale of A-rang
- Hangul: 아랑사또전
- Hanja: 阿娘使道傳
- RR: Arang sattojeon
- MR: Arang sattojŏn
- Genre: Fantasy; Horror; Period drama; Romance
- Created by: Kim Jin-man
- Written by: Jung Yoon-jung
- Directed by: Kim Sang-ho; Jung Dae-yoon
- Creative directors: Jung Jae-yeon; Kim Mi-na
- Starring: Lee Joon-gi; Shin Min-a; Yeon Woo-jin
- Composer: Kim Hyeon-jong
- Country of origin: South Korea
- Original language: Korean
- No. of episodes: 20

Production
- Executive producer: Kim Jin-man
- Cinematography: Kim Jong-jin
- Running time: 60 minutes
- Production companies: MBC TV; Number Three Pictures (as production proxy)

Original release
- Network: MBC
- Release: August 15 – October 18, 2012

Arang and the Magistrate (Korean: 아랑사또전; also known as Tale of A-rang) is a 2012 South Korean historical television drama (sageuk), starring Lee Joon-gi, Shin Min-a, and Yeon Woo-jin. The period horror-romance is based on the folklore of Arang, who died unjustly and returns as a ghost in order to reveal the circumstances surrounding her death. It aired on MBC from August 15 to October 18, 2012 for 20 episodes.

== Synopsis ==
A nobleman named Kim Eun-oh (Lee Joon-gi) comes to town searching for his mother after hearing a rumor that she is staying at the village of Miryang. He has the special ability to hear, see and touch spirits, but pretends he doesn't because he gets annoyed when they pester him to help them.

Arang (Shin Min-ah) lost all her memories when she became a ghost and is unable to rest in peace until she finds out how she died. After appearing to three magistrates, none of them survive the fright of seeing her. Some local officials, desperate over the fact that no one wanted to take up the position for so long, coerce Eun-oh into becoming the new magistrate. When she finds out that Eun-oh is able to see her, and has been appointed as the new magistrate, she begs for his help.

At first, Eun-oh rejects her request. However, he changes his mind after seeing that Arang somehow has a distinctive hairpin that he gave his mother at their last meeting. He believes that if he helps her, Arang will regain her memories and give him information about his mother. He exasperatedly (then affectionately) nicknames her "Amnesia". As the town's newly installed magistrate, he teams up with her to investigate the circumstances surrounding her death, which may involve the mysterious nobleman Joo-wal. Along the way, they must prevent Arang from being captured by Mu-young (Han Jung-soo), the leader of the local grim reapers. Eun-oh also uncovers a long history of corruption by a local nobleman and decides to use his new position as magistrate to bring justice and order.

Arang and Eun-oh's actions, meanwhile, are being tracked by the Jade Emperor and Yeom-ra themselves, who fear that events in Miryang are much more horrifying than they appear.

== Cast ==
=== Main ===
- Lee Joon-gi as Kim Eun-oh
- Shin Min-a as Arang / Lee Seo-rim
- Yeon Woo-jin as Joo-wal
- Hwang Bo-ra as Bang-wool, shaman
- Kwon Oh-joong as Dol-soe, Eun-oh's manservant
- Han Jung-soo as Mu-young, head ghost reaper
- Kang Moon-young as Lady Seo, Eun-oh's mother
- Kim Yong-gun as Lord Choi

=== Supporting ===
- Yoo Seung-ho as Jade Emperor, King of Heaven
- Park Jun-gyu as Yama, King of the Underworld
- Kim Kwang-kyu as Lee Bang
- Lee Sang-hoon as Hyung Bang
- Min Sung-wook as Ye Bang
- Kim Min-jae as Geo Deol
- Song Jae-ryong as Kim Seo-bang
- Noh Hee-ji as heavenly fairy
- Lee Yong-yi as Lee Seo-rim's housekeeper
- Lim Ju-eun as Mu-yeon
- Yoon Joo-sang as Lord Kim, Eun-oh's father
- Yoon Do-hyun as former magistrate of Miryang (cameo, ep. 1)
- Jung Soo-young as Bang-wool's client (cameo, ep. 1)
- Im Hyun-sik as ghost (cameo, ep. 2)
- Oh Yong as man in the cave (cameo, ep. 7)
- Jeong Bo-seok as teacher (cameo, ep. 14)
- Lee Sung-min as gatekeeper (cameo, ep. 20)
- Song Won-seok as Seok a Chugi (Angels of Death)

== Background ==
The drama is based on famous folklore, as most ghost stories are: During the Joseon era in the city of Miryang, Arang was the pure, beautiful, goodhearted daughter of a magistrate. She grew up without a mother and was raised by a wicked caretaker who conspired to have her raped and ruined by a servant, Baekga. He attacked and she resisted, so he stabbed and killed her, and left her body to rot in the woods. Her father, the magistrate, just believed that she dishonorably eloped with a man and so resigned his position swathed in shame. Thus the legend goes that every time a new magistrate comes to Miryang to fill the position, Arang's vengeful ghost shows up to tell him her story and he flees in terror. But one day a new magistrate comes to town — a young man by the name of Lee Sang-sa. Arang appears to him like every other magistrate before him, but this man doesn't flee, and instead sympathizes with Arang, and promises to find her killer and avenge her death. Lee Sang-sa has Baekga seized and executed, and thereafter, Arang's spirit ceased to trouble the town.

== Production ==
It was Lee Joon-gi's comeback acting project after being discharged from military service in February 2012. This also marked the first historical drama for Shin Min-ah and return to television since My Girlfriend Is a Nine-Tailed Fox in 2010.

The series was filmed at MBC Dramia in Gyeonggi Province. The first behind-the-scene photos were released on show of June 22, 2012, filming scenes shot on location in Namyangju on May 23. This was followed by more teaser photos released on July 11, 2012, showing action scenes and an intimate scene of the two leads, Lee and Shin laying down together.

Ahead of the series' premiere, MBC aired the special episode How to Enjoy Arang and the Magistrate 100 Times More on August 8, 2012. It included never-before-seen clips, special behind-the-scenes stories, and detailed the characters and their relationships. It was the first drama special produced by MBC in five years since The Legend in 2007.

The drama's rights was sold to Japan for a record-breaking ₩200 million per episode, which amounts to ₩4 billion for the 20-episode series, the highest per episode for MBC, surpassing the previous record set by Moon Embracing the Sun.

== Original soundtrack ==
Album	Track listing
Part 1: Released: August 15, 2012	Track listing: 1. "Fantasy" – Jaein Jang; 2. "Fantasy" (instrumental)
Part 2: Released: August 22, 2012	Track listing: 1. "Butterfly Dream (My Secret Dream)" – Yoon Do-hyun; 2. "Black Moon" – Shin Min-ah; 3. "Black Moon" (harmonica); 4. "My Secret Dream" (instrumental); 5. "Black Moon" (instrumental)
Part 3: Released: August 29, 2012	Track listing: 1. "Surprised" – Kim Bo-kyung; 2. "Surprised" (instrumental); 3. "Arang Love Theme"; 4. "Arang Legend"; 5. "Who Am I?"; 6. "New World"
Part 4: Released: September 5, 2012	Track listing: 1. "Love and Love" – Baek Ji-young; 2. "Love and Love" (instrumental)
Part 5: Released: September 13, 2012	Track listing: 1. "Mask Dance" – MC Sniper; 2. "Mask Dance" (instrumental)
Part 6: Released: September 19, 2012	Track listing: 1. "One Day" – Lee Joon-gi; 2. "One Day" (instrumental)
Part 7: Released: September 26, 2012	Track listing: 1. "Love Is You" – K.Will; 2. "Love Is You" (instrumental)
Part 8: Released: October 3, 2012	Track listing: 1. "Mirage" – Yoo Seung-chan; 2. "Mirage" (instrumental); 3. "Eun-oh"; 4. "The White Stairs"; 5. "셜븐살매"; 6. "The Dream of Arang"
Part 9: Released: October 10, 2012	Track listing: 1. "Shout" - Lee Ki-chan; 2. "Shout" (instrumental)
Special Edition: Released: October 17, 2012; Artist: Various artists; Format: 2CD	Track listing CD1: 1. "Fantasy" – Jaein Jang; 2. "Butterfly Dream (My Secret Dream)" – Yoon Do-hyun; 3. "Black Moon" – Shin Min-ah; 4. "Love and Love" – Baek Ji-young; 5. "Surprised" – Kim Bo-kyung; 6. "Mask Dance" – MC Sniper; 7. "One Day" – Lee Joon-gi; 8. "Love Is You" – K.Will; 9. "Shout" - Lee Ki-chan; 10. "Mirage" – Yoo Seung-chan; 11. "One Day" (instrumental); 12. "Love Is You" (instrumental); 13. "Shout" (instrumental); 14. "Mirage" (instrumental); CD2 - Background music: 1. "아랑 전설"; 2. "아랑 Love theme" 3. "A Garden of Heaven"; 4. "셜븐살매"; 5. "New world" 6. "나는 누구인가"; 7. "서털구털"; 8. "산책"; 9. "아랑의 추억"; 10. "Destiny"; 11. "은오"; 12. "아랑의 꿈"; 13. "The White Stairs"; 14. "Murderous"; 15. "덕호들"; 16. "대무녀"; 17. "다소니 혜윰"

== Ratings ==
- In the table below, the blue numbers represent the lowest ratings and the red numbers represent the highest ratings.
- According to AGB Nielsen Media Research, the premiere episode achieved a nationwide rating of 13.3 percent in viewership, almost doubled rival To the Beautiful You on SBS with 7.4 percent for its premiere episode but behind Bridal Mask on KBS with 19.4 percent. It was also 4.2 percent higher than the last episode of its predecessor I Do, I Do.

Ep.	Original broadcast date	Average audience share			
Ep.	Original broadcast date	Nielsen Korea		TNmS	
Ep.	Original broadcast date	Nationwide	Seoul	Nationwide	Seoul
Special	August 8, 2012	4.9%	8.0%	5.1%	5.4%
1	August 15, 2012	13.3%	15.1%	14.4%	16.8%
2	August 16, 2012	13.2%	14.4%	14.3%	16.5%
3	August 22, 2012	13.2%	14.2%	16.0%	19.3%
4	August 23, 2012	14.4%	15.7%	16.2%	19.3%
5	August 29, 2012	12.4%	13.7%	12.1%	13.3%
6	August 30, 2012	13.0%	14.4%	14.0%	16.3%
7	September 5, 2012	11.7%	12.8%	13.1%	14.6%
8	September 6, 2012	10.9%	11.9%	11.7%	14.2%
9	September 12, 2012	14.1%	15.3%	17.0%	19.5%
10	September 13, 2012	14.5%	15.1%	17.0%	20.5%
11	September 19, 2012	13.8%	14.9%	15.3%	17.2%
12	September 20, 2012	13.1%	14.0%	14.9%	16.0%
13	September 26, 2012	11.7%	12.9%	13.9%	15.9%
14	September 27, 2012	12.5%	13.0%	14.3%	16.0%
15	October 3, 2012	13.3%	14.5%	15.0%	17.7%
16	October 4, 2012	12.9%	14.4%	13.9%	16.2%
17	October 10, 2012	12.6%	13.8%	13.0%	15.2%
18	October 11, 2012	11.4%	12.1%	13.5%	15.1%
19	October 17, 2012	12.4%	14.0%	13.2%	14.7%
20	October 18, 2012	12.4%	13.8%	13.8%	16.5%
Average		14.3%	16.5%	12.8%	14.0%

== Awards and nominations ==
Year	Award	Category	Recipient	Result
2012	20th Korean Culture and Entertainment Awards	Best Supporting Actor	Kwon Oh-joong	Won
2012	MBC Drama Awards	Top Excellence Award, Actor in a Miniseries	Lee Joon-gi	Nominated
2012	MBC Drama Awards	Top Excellence Award, Actress in a Miniseries	Shin Min-a	Nominated
2012	MBC Drama Awards	Excellence Award, Actor in a Miniseries	Yoo Seung-ho	Nominated
2012	MBC Drama Awards	Excellence Award, Actress in a Miniseries	Hwang Bo-ra	Nominated
2012	MBC Drama Awards	Best New Actor	Yeon Woo-jin	Nominated
2012	MBC Drama Awards	Best Couple Award	Lee Joon-gi and Shin Min-a	Won
2013	Seoul International Drama Awards	Excellent Korean Drama		Won
2013	Seoul International Drama Awards	Outstanding Korean Drama Actor	Lee Joon-gi	Won
