= Munboksan =

Mountain in South Korea

Highest point
- Elevation: 1,015 m (3,330 ft)
- Coordinates: 35°40′34″N 129°02′02″E

Geography
- Location: Gyeongju, North Gyeongsang Province and Cheongdo County, South Korea

Korean name
- Hangul: 문복산
- Hanja: 文福山
- RR: Munboksan
- MR: Munboksan

Munboksan is a mountain located in Gyeongju, North Gyeongsang Province and Cheongdo County, South Korea. It has an elevation of 1,015 m (3,330 ft). It is part of the Yeongnam Alps mountain range.

== See also ==
- Geography of Korea
- List of mountains in Korea
- List of mountains by elevation
