= Cheonhwangsan =

Cheonhwangsan (천황산; 天皇山) is name of two mountains in Gyeongsangnam-do province, South Korea:

- Cheonhwangsan (Gyeongsangnam-do/Ulsan) in Gyeongsangnam-do province and the city of Ulsan
- Cheonhwangsan (Hapcheon, Gyeongsangnam-do) in the county of Hapcheon, in Gyeongsangnam-do province
