= Eoreumgol =

Valley in Miryang, South Korea

- Hangul: 얼음골
- RR: Eoreumgol
- MR: Ŏrŭmkol

Eoreumgol (Korean: 얼음골) or Ice Valley is a valley in Miryang, South Korea. It gets its name and its notoriety from the freezing cold found there even in midsummer. This phenomenon is believed to be due to local airflow patterns, particularly cold air emerging from underground.

The valley is situated on the slopes of Cheonhwangsan mountain, at about 600 m above sea level. It lies in Nammyeong-ri, Sannae-myeon, in northern Miryang, and covers a total area that is variously estimated at 9000 and 30000 m^{2}. The cold water flowing from the valley has traditionally been used for drinking by nearby residents.

One of Miryang's foremost tourist attractions, Eoreumgol is served by regular buses from the city center and is key to plans for boosting local tourism. In 1970 it was designated South Korean natural monument 224 by the national Cultural Heritage Administration.
