= Iseo-myeon, Cheongdo County =

Iseo-myeon
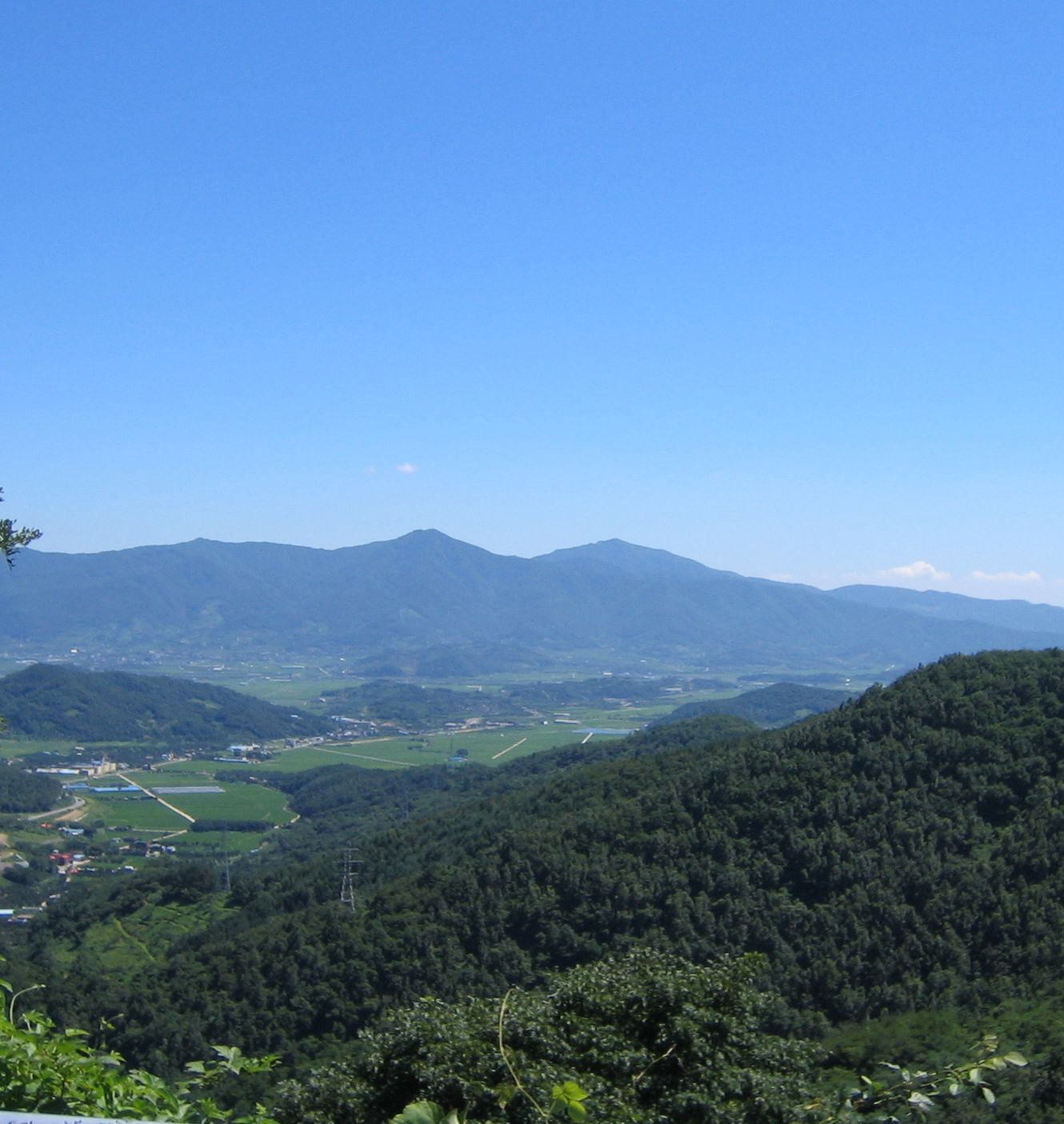
- View of a portion of Iseo-myeon from the Paljoryeong pass

- Location within South Korea
- Coordinates: 35°40′30″N 128°39′22″E
- Country: South Korea
- Administrative office: Haksan-ri

Area
  - Total: 55.29 km^{2} (21.35 sq mi)

Population (2022)
  - Total: 4,735
  - Density: 85.64/km^{2} (221.8/sq mi)

Korean name
- Hangul: 이서면
- Hanja: 伊西面
- RR: Iseo-myeon
- MR: Isŏ-myŏn

Iseo-myeon (Korean: 이서면) is a myeon, or township, in western Cheongdo County, Gyeongsangbuk-do, South Korea. It borders Daegu on the north. It is connected to both Daegu and central Cheongdo by Local Route 30, which crosses under the Paljoryeong pass as it descends from Daegu to its terminus in Gangnam-myeon. Administratively, Iseo-myeon is composed of 17 legal ri, which are divided into 31 administrative ri.

The region has a long history of human habitation, and may have been the site of the Samhan era polity of Iseoguk. However, it was not constituted as Iseo-myeon until the general reorganization of local government under the Japanese occupation in 1914.

As of 2022, Iseo-myeon had a registered resident population of 4,735. Of these, 4,504 (94.7%) were Korean and 231 (5.3%) were non-Korean. The average age of residents in Iseo-myeon was 58.

Iseo-myeon is best known for the Cheongdo Bullfighting Festival, which is held annually on the banks of the Seowoncheon. There are also four Joseon Dynasty institutions of education preserved in Iseo-myeon; these are the Heungseon Seowon (also called the Jagye Seowon), the Geumho Seowon, the Songgo Seodang and the Yonggang Seowon. The seodang and seowon were both private academies, which focused principally on training children of the yangban class to pass the national civil service exam. The Heungseon Seowon was erected in memory of Kim Il-son, who perished in the Muo purge of 1498. The Geumho Seowon was erected in memory of Yi Un-ryong, who fought in the Seven Year War against Japan.

Notable people from Iseo-myeon include Lee Eui-geun, former governor of North Gyeongsang province, who was born there.

== See also ==
- Geography of South Korea
- Subdivisions of South Korea
