= Yeongchuksan =

Mountain in South Korea

- Yeongchwisan; Chwiseosan; Chukseosan

Highest point
- Elevation: 1,081 m (3,547 ft)
- Coordinates: 35°31′01″N 129°03′18″E

Geography
- Location: South Korea
- Parent range: Yeongnam Alps

Korean name
- Hangul: 영축산
- Hanja: 靈鷲山
- RR: Yeongchuksan
- MR: Yŏngch'uksan

Yeongchuksan (Korean: 영축산) is a mountain in South Korea. It extends over the cities of Ulsan and Yangsan in South Gyeongsang Province. This mountain is also referred to as Yeongchwisan (영취산), Chwiseosan (취서산), and Chukseosan (축서산). Yeongchuksan has an elevation of 1,081 m (3,547 ft). It is part of the Yeongnam Alps mountain range.

== See also ==
- List of mountains in Korea
