= Maejeon-myeon =

Township in North Gyeongsang, South Korea

Coordinates: 35.6671°N 128.8548°E

- Hangul: 매전면
- Hanja: 梅田面
- RR: Maejeon-myeon
- MR: Maejŏn-myŏn

Maejeon-myeon (Korean: 매전면) is a township in Cheongdo County, North Gyeongsang, South Korea. It covers an area of 130.19 square kilometres (50.27 mi^{2}). It was established in 1914 by combining three existing townships.

As of 2022, Maejeon-myeon had a registered population of 3,747 residents in 2,329 households. Of these residents, 3,736 (99.7%) were Korean. The average age of residents in Maejeon-myeon was 62.3.

Maejeon-myeon is divided into 20 legal ri. It is home to an elementary school and to Maejeon Middle School, both of which are located in Dongsan-ri. The middle school is built on the site of the Joseon-era Maejeon stage station, for which the township is named.

Maejeon is well known for producing seedless persimmons, jujubes and hapyeong ginkgo. Tourists from neighboring counties like to visit the Cheongdo Bansi Agricultural Experience, where they can pick persimmons and jujubes.
