= Goheonsan =

Mountain in Ulsan, South Korea

Highest point
- Elevation: 1,032 m (3,386 ft)
- Coordinates: 35°38′46″N 129°05′13″E

Geography
- Location: South Korea
- Parent range: Taebaek Mountains

Korean name
- Hangul: 고헌산
- Hanja: 高獻山
- RR: Goheonsan
- MR: Kohŏnsan

Goheonsan (Korean: 고헌산) is a mountain in the vicinity of Ulsan, South Korea. It has an elevation of 1,032 m (3,386 ft). It is part of the Yeongnam Alps mountain range.

== See also ==
- List of mountains in Korea
