= Sinbulsan =

Mountain in South Korea

Highest point
- Elevation: 1,209 m (3,967 ft)
- Coordinates: 35°32′24″N 129°03′22″E

Geography
- Location: South Korea

Korean name
- Hangul: 신불산
- Hanja: 神佛山
- RR: Sinbulsan
- MR: Sinbulsan

Sinbulsan (Korean: 신불산) is a mountain in South Korea. It extends over the cities of Ulsan and Yangsan in South Gyeongsang Province. Sinbulsan has an elevation of 1,209 m (3,967 ft). It is part of the Yeongnam Alps mountain range.

== See also ==
- List of mountains in Korea
- List of South Korean tourist attractions
