= Unmunsan =

Mountain in South Korea

Coordinates: 35°40′35″N 129°02′03″E

운문산 Unmunsan

Highest point
- Elevation: 1,195 m (3,921 ft)

Geography
- Location: North Gyeongsang Province, South Korea

Unmunsan is a mountain of North Gyeongsang Province, eastern South Korea. It has an elevation of 1,195 metres. It is part of the Yeongnam Alps mountain range.

The Unmunsan firefly (Luciola unmunsana) is named after it.

== See also ==
- List of mountains of Korea
