= Gajisan (Ulsan and Gyeongsang) =

Mountain in North Gyeongsang Province, South Korea

Highest point
- Elevation: 1,241 m (4,072 ft)
- Prominence: 1,111 m (3,645 ft)
- Listing: Ribu
- Coordinates: 35°37′16″N 129°00′11″E

Geography
- Location: South Korea

Korean name
- Hangul: 가지산
- Hanja: 迦智山
- RR: Gajisan
- MR: Kajisan

Gajisan (Korean: 가지산) is a mountain in South Korea. It sits on the boundary between Ulsan, Miryang, and Cheongdo County. Gajisan has an elevation of 1,240 m (4,068 ft). It is part of the Yeongnam Alps mountain range.

== See also ==
- List of mountains in Korea
- List of South Korean tourist attractions
