= Mirimidong =

Korean Byeonhan protostate

- Hangul: 미리미동국
- Hanja: 彌離彌凍國
- RR: Mirimidongguk
- MR: Mirimidongguk

The Chiefdom of Mirimidong (Korean: 미리미동국; Hanja: 彌離彌凍國) was one of the 12 tribes or polities making up the Byeonhan confederation. It is mentioned in the Chinese text Records of the Three Kingdoms, and is generally believed to have been located near the modern-day city of Miryang in Gyeongsangnam-do, South Korea.

Later Mirimidong was absorbed into Geumgwan Gaya. By the early 6th century, it had fallen under the sway of Silla; in 505, it was formally integrated into Silla as the county of Chuhwa-gun.
