= Cheongdocheon =

Stream in South Korea

- Location of mouth

Location
- Country: South Korea
- Province: North Gyeongsang Province
- County: Cheongdo County

Physical characteristics
- Source
  - location: Gakbuk-myeon, Cheongdo
  - elevation: 277.84 m (911.5 ft)
- Mouth: Miryang River
  - location: Cheongdo-eup, Cheongdo
  - coordinates: 35.57°N 128.77°E
  - elevation: 34.93 m (114.6 ft)
- Length: 38.75 km (24.08 mi)
- Basin size: 337 km^{2} (130 sq mi)

Basin features
- River system: Nakdong River

Korean name
- Hangul: 청도천
- Hanja: 淸道川
- RR: Cheongdocheon
- MR: Ch'ŏngdoch'ŏn

Cheongdocheon (Korean: 청도천) is a stream that flows through Cheongdo County in North Gyeongsang Province. It rises on the slopes of Biseulsan in Gakbuk-myeon and flows for 38.2 kilometres (23.7 mi) before joining the Miryang River at Cheongdo-eup.

The Cheongdocheon drains a watershed of 337 km^{2}, and has a flow length (the longest distance from the mouth to the watershed perimeter) of 41 km. A small alluvial plain along the Cheongdocheon is used for farmland.

Under the River Act of South Korea, the Cheongdocheon is classified as a local river which is subject to provincial jurisdiction.

== Name ==
The stream takes its name from Cheongdo County through which it flows. Other names of the stream include Jacheon (used in the Joseon Dynasty) and Songeupcheon (used locally in Cheongdo-eup).

Confusion can arise from the fact that another stream by the same name flows through Miryang and Changnyeong County, taking its name from Cheongdo-myeon in Miryang.

== Tributaries ==
Other local rivers flowing into the Cheongdocheon include the Osancheon, Punggakcheon, Bugokcheon, Daegokcheon, and Darocheon.

Among the Cheongdocheon's smaller tributaries is the Seowoncheon ("seowon stream") in Iseo-myeon. The Cheongdo Bullfighting Festival was held on the sandy banks of the Seowoncheon until the Cheongdo Bullfighting Stadium was constructed in 2009.

== Fauna ==
A study in the 1990s found that the Cheongdocheon was home to 31 species of fish, of which 14 are unique to Korea. The three most common species observed were the dark chub (Nipponocypris temminckii), the pale chub (Zacco platypus), and the slender gudgeon (Squalidus gracilis).

A 15-kilometre (9.3 mi) section of the Cheongdocheon is a popular habitat for migratory birds. About 20 species of migratory birds have been observed wintering in the area, including the mandarin duck.
