= Samnangjin =

- Panoramic view of Samnangjin

- Location within South Korea
- Coordinates: 35°23′42″N 128°50′18″E
- Country: South Korea

Area
  - Total: 78.31 km^{2} (30.24 sq mi)

Population (2020)
  - Total: 6,682

Korean name
- Hangul: 삼랑진읍
- Hanja: 三浪津邑
- RR: Samnangjin-eup
- MR: Samnangjin-ŭp

Samnangjin (Korean: 삼랑진읍) is an eup, or town, in Miryang City, Gyeongsangnam-do, South Korea. It is composed of thirteen legal ri. Samnangjin lies in the southeastern corner of Miryang, bordering Wondong-myeon in Yangsan City.

The Gyeongbu Line railroad passes through Samnangjin, and Mugunghwa-ho class passenger trains frequently stop at Samnangjin station. The northern tip of the Gyeongjeon Line also lies with Samnangjin, but there are no stations along that portion of the line.

Samnangjin lies at the confluence of Nakdong River and its tributary the Miryang River. Its name refers to the three streams formed by the confluence (the Nakdong above the confluence, the Miryang, and the Nakdong below the confluence). Much of the land in Samnangjin lies along the eastern valleys of the Miryang and the Nakdong, which also form the western border of the eup. Notable mountains on the borders of Samnangjin include Cheontaesan to the south and Maneosan to the north.

Much of the agriculture in Samnangjin is focused on livestock, particularly beef cattle.

The Miryang campus of Pusan National University is located in Samnangjin's Cheonghak-ri.
