= Ganwolsan =

Mountain in Ulsan, South Korea

Highest point
- Elevation: 1,083.1 m (3,553 ft)
- Coordinates: 35°33′04″N 129°02′28″E

Geography
- Location: South Korea

Korean name
- Hangul: 간월산
- Hanja: 肝月山
- RR: Ganwolsan
- MR: Kanwŏlsan

Ganwolsan (Korean: 간월산) is a mountain in Ulsan, South Korea. It has an elevation of 1,083.1 m (3,553 ft). It is part of the Yeongnam Alps mountain range.

== See also ==
- List of mountains in Korea
