= Jaeyaksan =

Mountain in South Gyeongsang Province, South Korea

Highest point
- Elevation: 1,108 m (3,635 ft)
- Coordinates: 35°32′48″N 128°58′50″E

Geography
- Location: South Korea

Korean name
- Hangul: 재약산
- Hanja: 載藥山
- RR: Jaeyaksan
- MR: Chaeyaksan

Jaeyaksan (Korean: 재약산) is a mountain of South Korea. It has an elevation of 1,108 metres. It is part of the Yeongnam Alps mountain range.

== See also ==
- List of mountains of Korea
