= Unmun-myeon =

Township in North Gyeongsang, South Korea

- Hangul: 운문면
- Hanja: 雲門面
- RR: Unmun-myeon
- MR: Unmun-myŏn

Unmun-myeon (Korean: 운문면) is a myeon, or township, in Cheongdo County, North Gyeongsang Province, South Korea. It is the easternmost township in Cheongdo.

Unmun township is home to several Buddhist Temples. The most famous one is Unmun Temple (운문사), located in the southeast corner of Cheongdo County. Unmun Temple is home of the Old Pine in Unmun Temple, which is said to be over 500 years old. The temple itself was established in AD 560. Unmun Temple is also home to the largest Buddhist Nun's college in Korea. About 250 students follow a three to four-year course in Buddhism.

The county is also known for Unmun dam, which provides hydroelectric power for eastern Cheongdo. Tourists gather to photograph the mist rising from the waters in the early morning hours in March. In August, visitors can enjoy water sports, riding, fishing and touring in the downstream area.

Unmun township is also famous for its spring cherry blossoms and shiitake mushrooms.
