= Nenjiang Town =

Nenjiang 嫩江镇
- Town
- Location in Heilongjiang Nenjiang (China)
- Coordinates: 49°11′09″N 125°13′16″E
- Country: People's Republic of China
- Province: Heilongjiang
- Prefecture-level city: Heihe
- County: Nenjiang
- Elevation: 225 m (738 ft)
- Time zone: UTC+8 (China Standard Time)
- Postal code: 161400

Nenjiang (Chinese: 嫩江; pinyin: Nènjiāng) is a town in and the seat of the city of Nenjiang, in northwestern Heilongjiang province, China, bordering Inner Mongolia to the north and west and sitting on the east (left) bank of the Nen River. As of 2011, it has 12 residential communities (社区) and 5 villages under its administration.

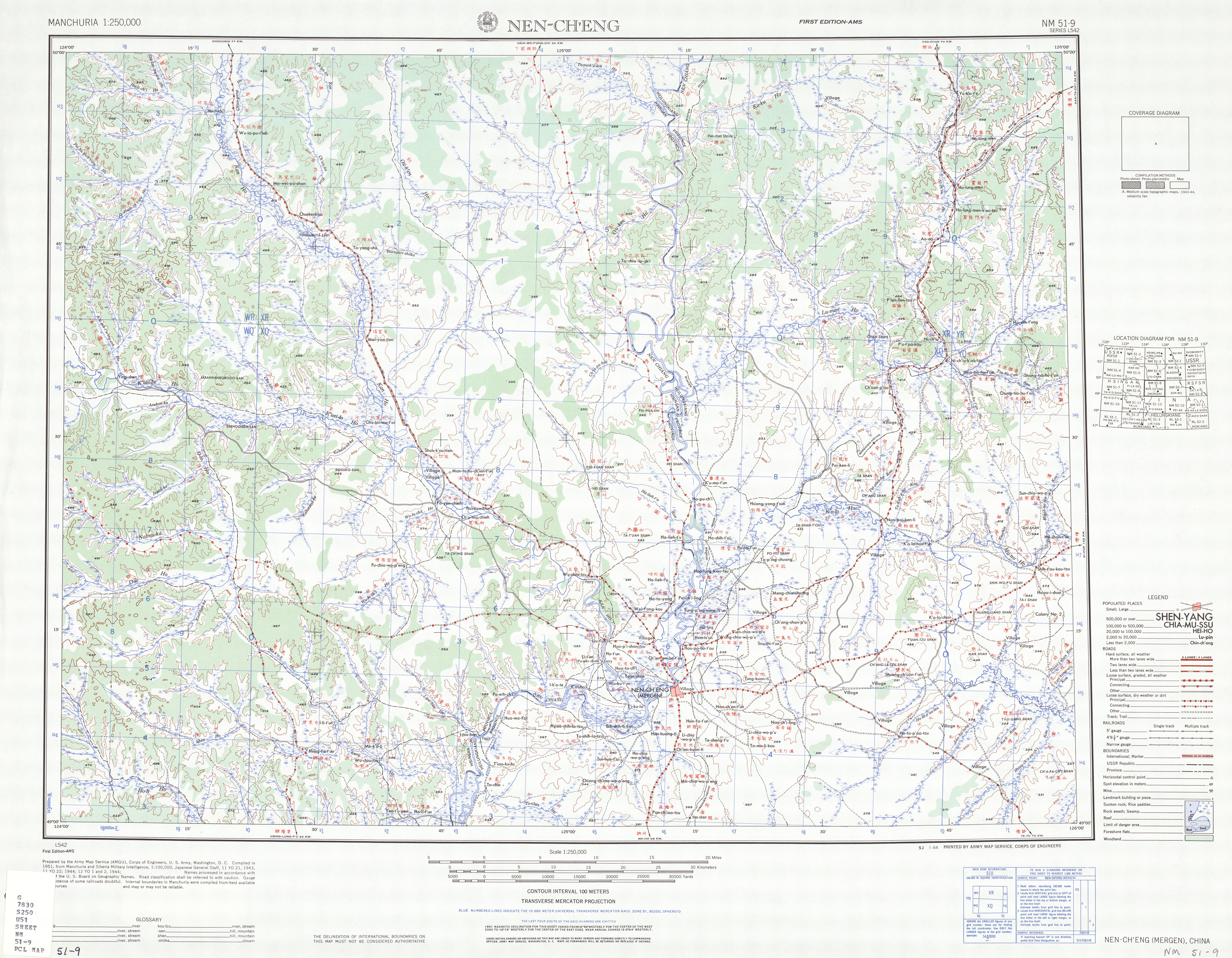
Map including Nenjiang (labeled as NEN-CH'ENG (MERGEN)) (AMS, 1951)

== See also ==
- List of township-level divisions of Heilongjiang
