= Miryang River =

River in South Korea

- Hangul: 밀양강
- Hanja: 密陽江
- RR: Miryanggang
- MR: Miryanggang

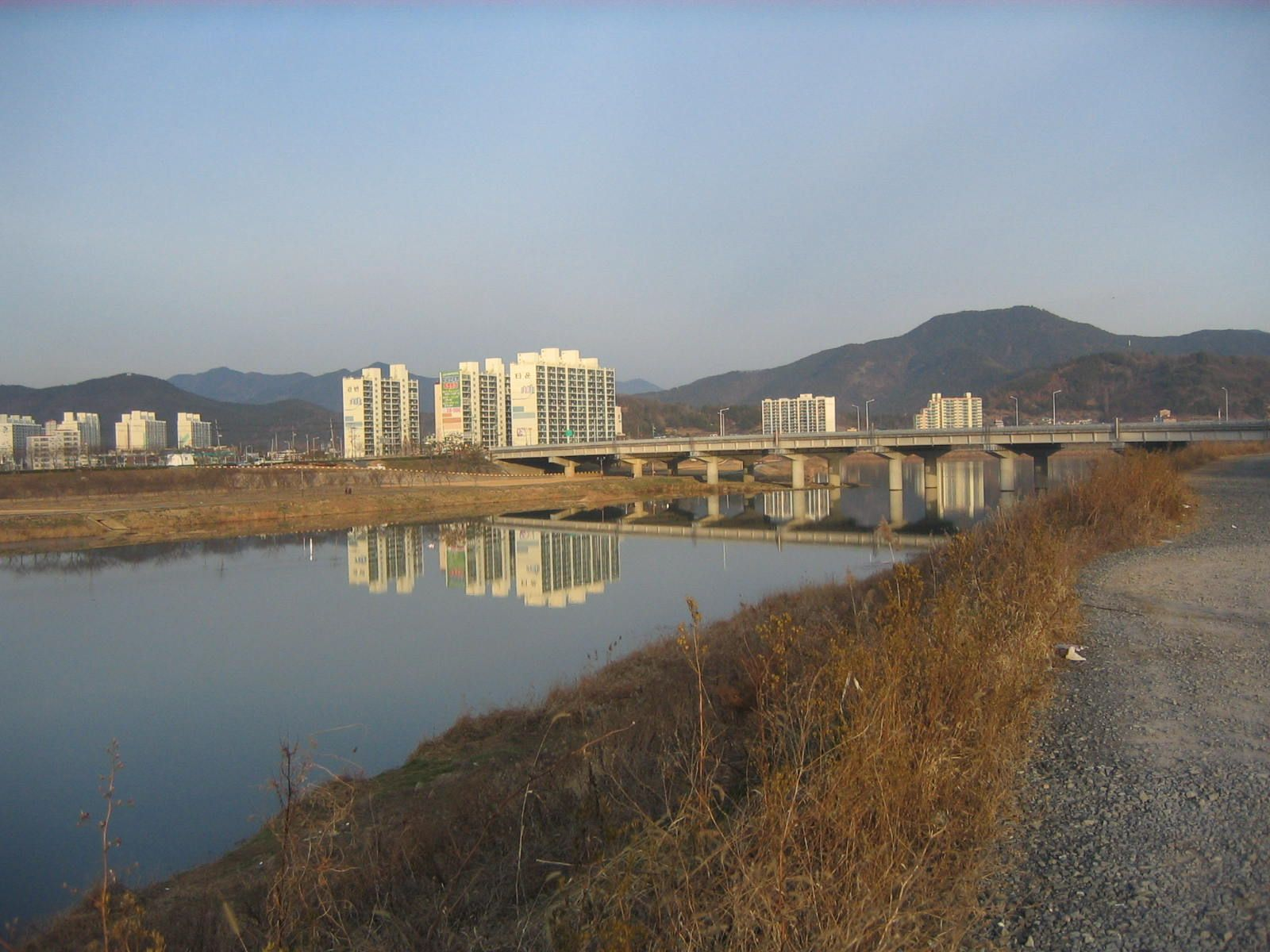
Bridge crossing the Miryang River into Sammun-dong, Miryang-si from the west.

The Miryang River (Korean: 밀양강) is a tributary of the Nakdong River which flows through Miryang. It rises in Ulsan, on the slopes of Gohyeonsan, and flows for 101.5 kilometers before joining the Nakdong in Miryang's Samnangjin-eup. Its narrower upper reaches are often called the Miryangcheon, or "Miryang Stream."

The Miryang River watershed covers 1,421.26 km^{2}. Important tributaries include the Cheongdocheon, flowing south from Cheongdo, and the Dongchangcheon flowing out of Gyeongju.

Most of the Miryang River valley is occupied by rice fields, but great oxbow curve which flows through downtown Miryang has long been used for recreational purposes. In addition to a riverwalk and open-air arena, the river is overlooked by the famous Yeongnamnu pavilion, which dates from the Joseon period. The Arang pavilion also overlooks the river in this area, as does the Miryang City Museum. Other nearby attractions include the Yeongnam Alps, which run along the eastern flank of the river's lower reaches.

The region just above the confluence of the Miryang and Nakdong rivers is called the Miryang Plain, 4 km wide at its widest point. This area is known for its fertile soil, and is home to numerous orchards and vegetable farms in addition to rice fields.

== See also ==
- Rivers of Korea
- Geography of South Korea
