= Cheontaesan (Chungcheong) =

Mountain in North Chungcheong, South Korea

Highest point
- Elevation: 714.7 m (2,345 ft)
- Listing: Mountains of Korea
- Coordinates: 36°09′32″N 127°36′00″E

Geography
- Country: South Korea
- Provinces: North Chungcheong and South Chungcheong

Korean name
- Hangul: 천태산
- Hanja: 天台山
- RR: Cheontaesan
- MR: Ch'ŏnt'aesan

Cheontaesan (Korean: 천태산) is a South Korean mountain in the counties of Geumsan, South Chungcheong Province and Yeongdong, North Chungcheong Province in South Korea. It has an elevation of 714.7 m (2,345 ft).
