= Yeongnamnu (Miryang) =

Pavilion

Coordinates: 35°29′30″N 128°45′20″E

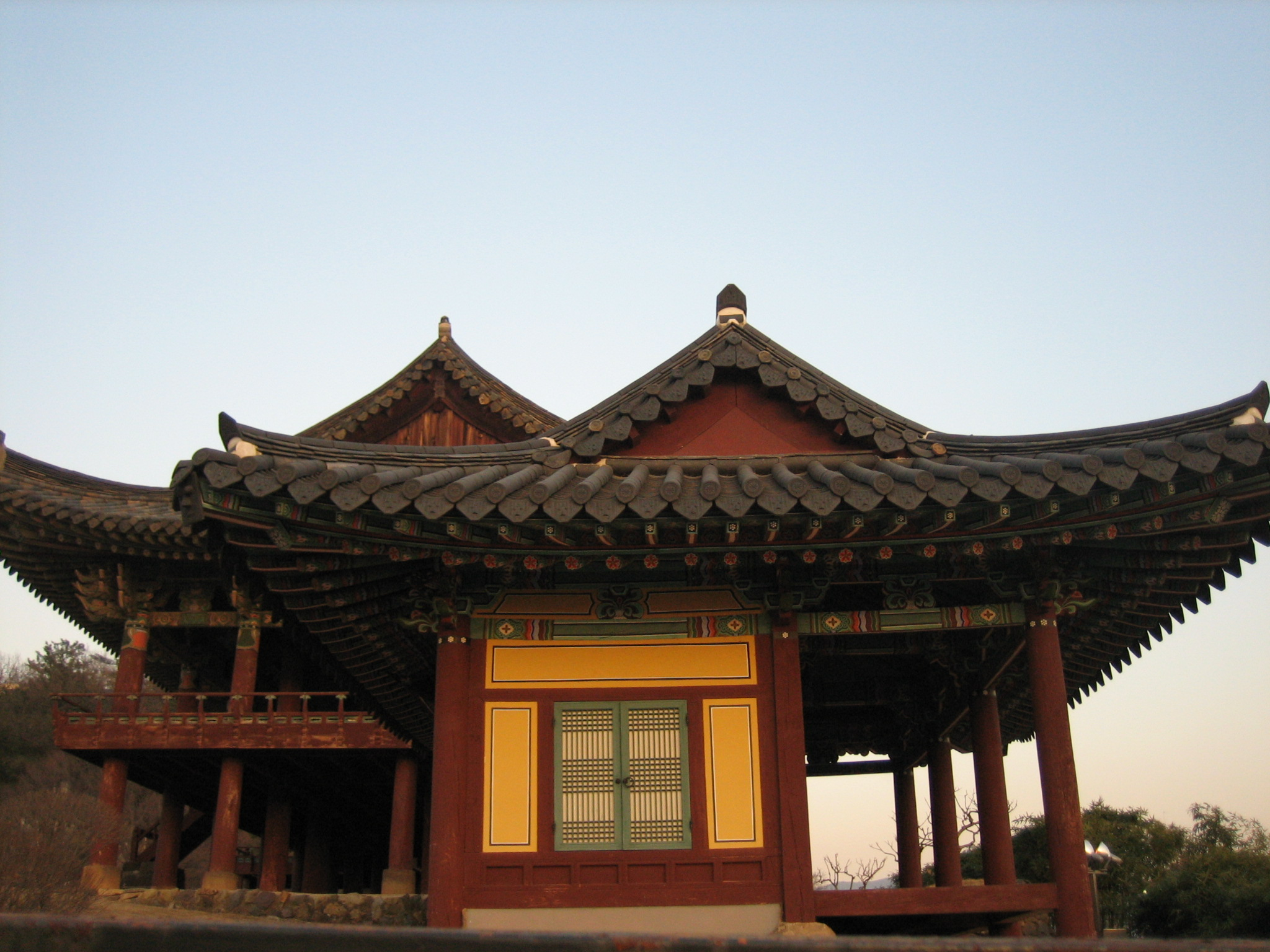
- Chimnyugak at the west wing of Yeongnamnu

Korean name
- Hangul: 영남루
- Hanja: 嶺南樓
- RR: Yeongnamnu
- MR: Yŏngnamnu

The Yeongnamnu or Yeongnamru is a pavilion on a cliff overlooking the curve of the Miryang River in central Miryang, Gyeongsangnam-do, South Korea. It dates to the Joseon Dynasty and is one of the central cultural treasures of Miryang. The current structure was built in 1884 according to the design of then-magistrate Yi In-jae. During the Joseon period, this was known as one of the three great pavilions of Korea, together with the Chokseongnu in Jinju and the Pubyŏk pavilion in Pyongyang.

The Yeongnamnu itself is actually one of a complex of historic buildings. Stone-carved calligraphy from the Joseon period abounds in the pavilion complex. Also near the Yeongnamnu stand the Aranggak pavilion and the Miryang City Museum.

The first pavilion was probably constructed on this site in the Silla period, as part of the now-vanished temple of Yeongnamsa. That pavilion was torn down in the late Goryeo period and replaced by the precursor of the current structure. It became affiliated with the Miryang guesthouse (gaeksa), which thanks to Miryang's location on the Great Yeongnam Road often played host to officials traveling between Hanyang (Seoul) and Busan.

The Yeongnamnu shares its name with Yeongnam, the traditional region of Korea in which Miryang is located. In both cases, the name means "south of the pass." While the name of the region probably refers to Mungyeong Saejae or Haneuljae, the name of the pavilion and the temple may refer to Paljoryeong.

== See also ==
- Korean architecture
