= Sangwonsan =

Mountain in South Korea

Coordinates: 35°44′N 128°41′E

Highest point
- Elevation: 862 m (2,828 ft)

Geography
- Location: South Korea

Korean name
- Hangul: 상원산
- Hanja: 上元山
- RR: Sangwonsan
- MR: Sangwŏnsan

Sangwonsan (Korean: 상원산) is a mountain in Jeongseon County, Gangwon Province, South Korea. It has an elevation of 862 m (2,828 ft).

== See also ==
- List of mountains in Korea
