= Geumosan (Jeonnam-Gwangju) =

Mountain in South Korea

Highest point
- Elevation: 323 m (1,060 ft)

Geography
- Location: South Jeolla Province, South Korea

Geumosan (Korean: 금오산) is a mountain of South Jeolla Province, southwestern South Korea. It has an elevation of 323 metres.

== See also ==
- List of mountains of Korea
