= Geumcheon-myeon, Cheongdo County =

Township in North Gyeongsang province, South Korea

Coordinates: 35.687°N 128.892°E

- Hangul: 금천면
- Hanja: 錦川面
- RR: Geumcheon-myeon
- MR: Kŭmch'ŏn-myŏn

Geumcheon-myeon (Korean: 금천면) is a myeon, or township, in eastern Cheongdo County, North Gyeongsang Province, South Korea. Geumcheon-myeon is composed of 10 subdivisions known as legal ri. It covers an area of 71.88 square kilometres (27.75 mi^{2}).

As of 2022, Geumcheon-myeon had a registered resident population of 3,281. Of these, 3,222 (98.2%) were Korean. The average age of residents in Geumcheon-myeon was 62.4.

The Dongchang River runs through Geumcheon-myeon. Geumcheon is also the home of the Ungang Old House and Geumcheon Middle and High School, the only High School in eastern Cheongdo. It is also home to several Buddhist temples and historic Confucian academies.

More than 4,000 head of cattle are raised in Geumcheon-myeon. Donggok-ri marks the eastern frontier of cow country in Cheongdo.

Fruits grown in Geumcheon-myeon include jujubes (34 hectares (84 acres)), peaches (25 hectares (62 acres)), and persimmons (23 hectares (57 acres)).
