= Hanam-eup =

Township in Miryang, South Korea

Hanam
- eup
- Panoramic view of Hanam-eup
- Interactive map of Hanam
- Country: South Korea
- Administrative divisions: 33 administrative ri, 19 legal ri

Area
  - Total: 37.09 km^{2} (14.32 sq mi)

Population (2004)
  - Total: 9,762
  - Density: 263.2/km^{2} (682/sq mi)

Korean name
- Hangul: 하남읍
- Hanja: 下南邑
- RR: Hanam-eup
- MR: Hanam-ŭp

Hanam-eup (Korean: 하남읍) is an eup, or large village, in Miryang, Gyeongsangnam-do, South Korea. It stands at the southern tip of Miryang, and looks across the Nakdong River at the northern tips of Gimhae and Changwon.

In the Silla period, Hanam-eup was a bugok, or stipend-village, known as "Susan-bugok" (穿山部曲). In the Goryeo period, it was raised to the status of a hyeon, and later incorporated into Milseong-bu (now Miryang).

Noted local landmarks include Bronze Age dolmens in Namjeon-ri, and a monument to late Goryeo scholar-official Yi Sin, also in Namjeon-ri. The Susan-je, a dike believed to date to the Samhan period, is also located in Hanam.

Although some manufacturing is carried out in Hanam, the local economy is dominated by agriculture. Local specialties include potatoes, strawberries, cabbage, and sweet persimmons.

== See also ==
- Haman County
