= Nenjiang City =

Nenjiang 嫩江市 Mergen; Nunkiang
- County-level city
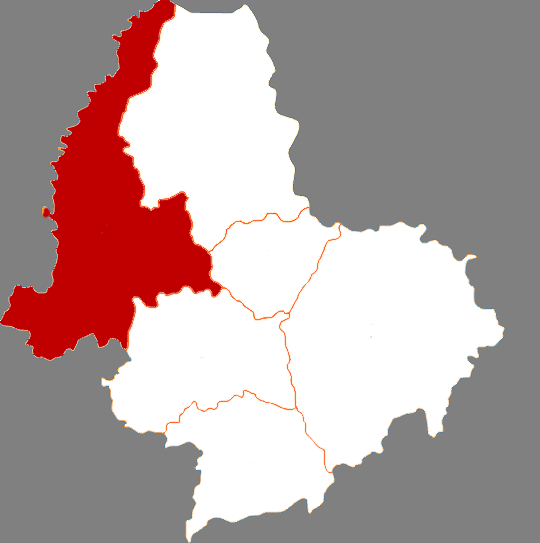
- Nenjiang in Heihe

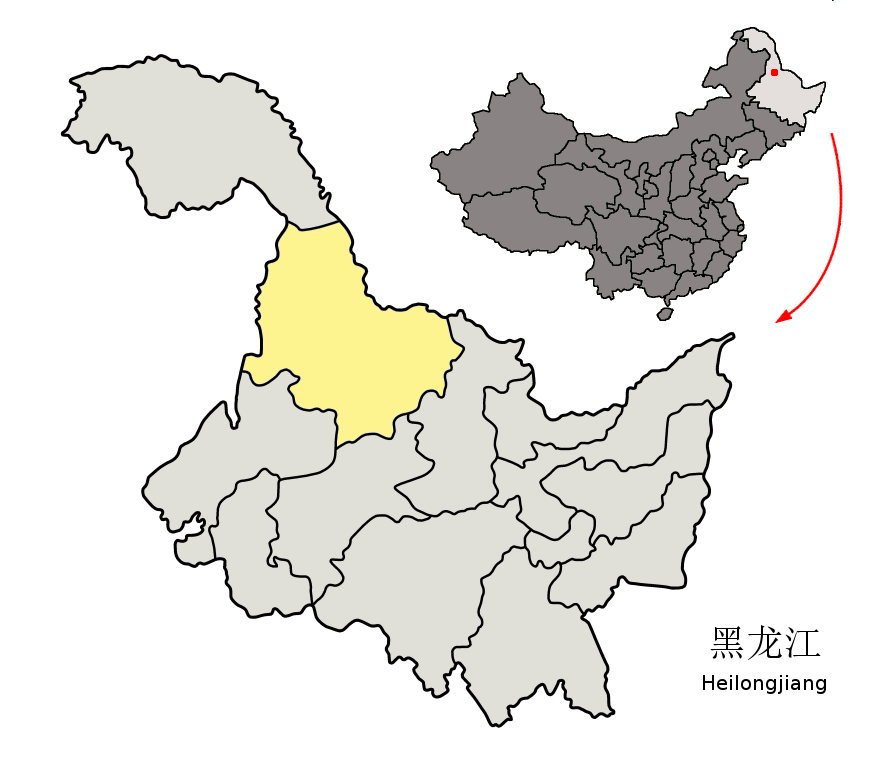
- Heihe in Heilongjiang
- Coordinates: 49°07′N 125°08′E
- Country: People's Republic of China
- Province: Heilongjiang
- Prefecture-level city: Heihe
- City seat: Nenjiang Town

Area
  - Total: 15,360 km^{2} (5,930 sq mi)
- Elevation: 230 m (750 ft)

Population
  - Total: 500,000
  - Density: 33/km^{2} (84/sq mi)
- Time zone: UTC+8 (China Standard)
- Postal code: 161400
- Area code: 0456
- Website: www.nenjiang.gov.cn

Nenjiang City (Chinese: 嫩江市; pinyin: Nènjiāng shì), formerly Nenjiang County, is a county-level city under the administration of Heihe prefecture-level city in northwestern Heilongjiang province, China. It is located on the river of the same name (Nen River), which also forms part of the provincial border with Inner Mongolia, more than 200 kilometres (120 mi) southwest of the urban area of Heihe. The city seat is Nenjiang Town. Land area 15,360 square kilometres (5,930 sq mi), population 500,000.

== History ==
Under the name Mergen or Merghen (墨爾根, Mò'ěrgēn), Nenjiang was the provincial capital and seat of the military governor of Heilongjiang Province in 1690–1699.

== Geography and climate ==
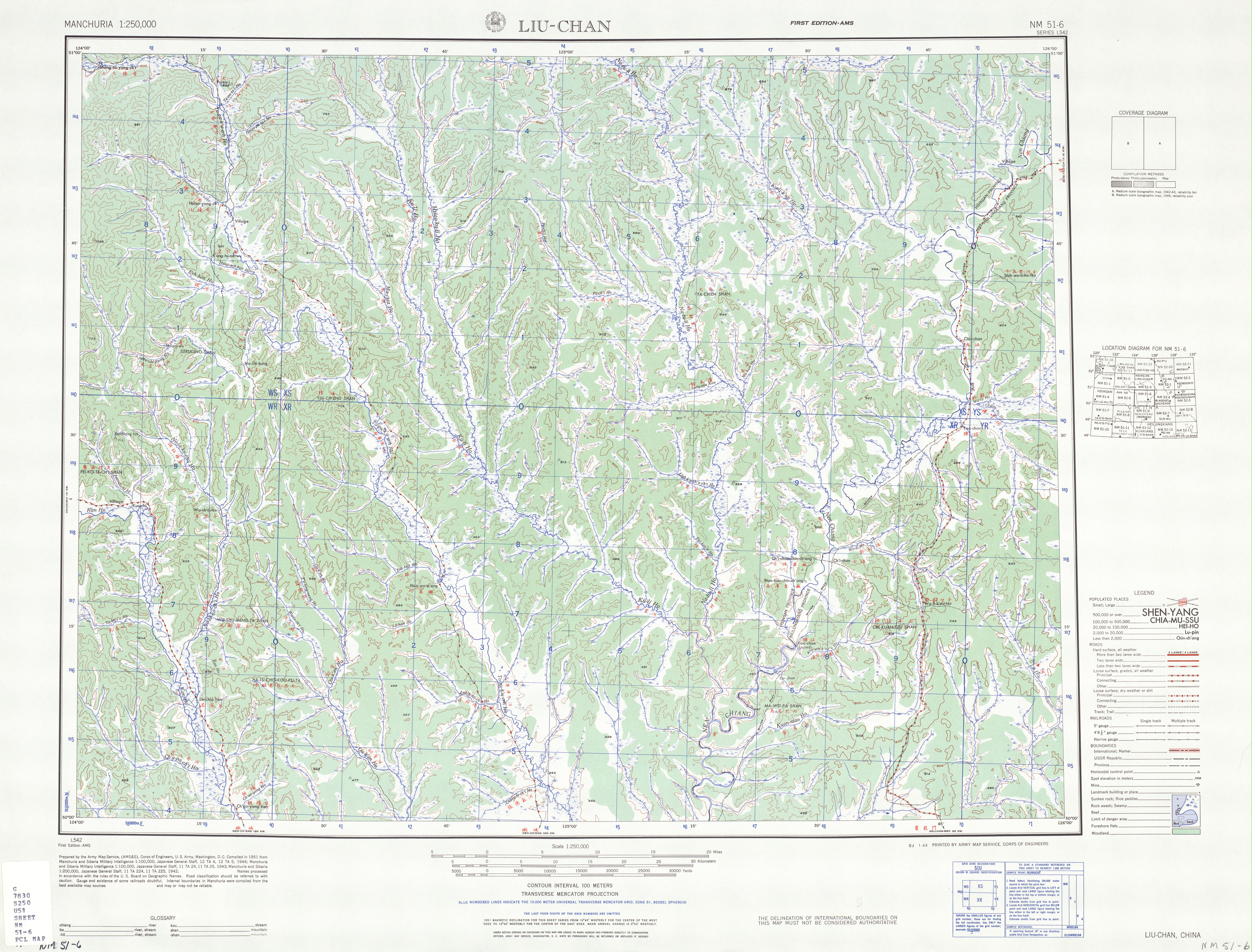
Map including part of northern Nenjiang (AMS, 1951)

Nenjiang has a monsoon-influenced humid continental climate (Köppen Dwb), with long, harsh, but dry winters, and short, very warm summers. The monthly 24-hour average temperature ranges from −23.3 °C (−9.9 °F) in January to 21.1 °C (70.0 °F) in July; the year averages out at only 0.85 °C (33.5 °F). Around 80% of the annual precipitation occurs from June to September. With monthly percent possible sunshine ranging from 53% in July to 74% in February, sunshine is generous year-round, totalling 2,726 hours annually.

Climate data for Nenjiang, elevation 242 m (794 ft), (1991–2020 normals, extremes 1971–2020)
Month	Jan	Feb	Mar	Apr	May	Jun	Jul	Aug	Sep	Oct	Nov	Dec	Year
Record high °C (°F)	0.4 (32.7)	8.0 (46.4)	19.7 (67.5)	31.4 (88.5)	37.0 (98.6)	40.0 (104.0)	37.7 (99.9)	34.4 (93.9)	33.9 (93.0)	26.8 (80.2)	12.9 (55.2)	2.6 (36.7)	40.0 (104.0)
Mean daily maximum °C (°F)	−16.4 (2.5)	−10.4 (13.3)	−0.5 (31.1)	11.4 (52.5)	20.1 (68.2)	25.7 (78.3)	27.2 (81.0)	24.9 (76.8)	19.3 (66.7)	9.3 (48.7)	−4.6 (23.7)	−15.1 (4.8)	7.6 (45.6)
Daily mean °C (°F)	−23.0 (−9.4)	−18.1 (−0.6)	−7.3 (18.9)	4.8 (40.6)	13.3 (55.9)	19.4 (66.9)	21.7 (71.1)	19.1 (66.4)	12.6 (54.7)	3.2 (37.8)	−10.3 (13.5)	−20.9 (−5.6)	1.2 (34.2)
Mean daily minimum °C (°F)	−29.0 (−20.2)	−25.3 (−13.5)	−14.4 (6.1)	−2.3 (27.9)	5.9 (42.6)	12.9 (55.2)	16.3 (61.3)	13.7 (56.7)	6.3 (43.3)	−2.6 (27.3)	−15.9 (3.4)	−26.4 (−15.5)	−5.1 (22.9)
Record low °C (°F)	−43.9 (−47.0)	−42.1 (−43.8)	−37.2 (−35.0)	−17.9 (−0.2)	−8.6 (16.5)	0.0 (32.0)	5.8 (42.4)	2.1 (35.8)	−7.1 (19.2)	−25.5 (−13.9)	−35.4 (−31.7)	−42.2 (−44.0)	−43.9 (−47.0)
Average precipitation mm (inches)	3.7 (0.15)	3.5 (0.14)	5.1 (0.20)	16.7 (0.66)	44.2 (1.74)	87.8 (3.46)	123.9 (4.88)	111.4 (4.39)	60.0 (2.36)	23.5 (0.93)	7.9 (0.31)	5.6 (0.22)	493.3 (19.44)
Average precipitation days (≥ 0.1 mm)	5.9	3.7	4.3	6.0	9.4	12.7	14.0	13.1	9.3	6.4	5.9	6.7	97.4
Average snowy days	8.5	6.4	6.4	3.9	0.3	0	0	0	0.1	3.6	8.1	9.5	46.8
Average relative humidity (%)	70	67	59	48	49	63	76	79	69	60	67	71	65
Mean monthly sunshine hours	175.1	208.0	253.8	245.0	267.6	260.0	244.3	240.8	227.7	203.6	169.7	152.2	2,647.8
Percentage possible sunshine	65	72	68	59	56	54	51	55	61	62	63	60	61
Source 1: China Meteorological AdministrationNOAA
Source 2: Weather China

== Administrative divisions ==
Nenjiang City is divided into 9 towns and 5 townships.

9 towns

- Nenjiang (嫩江镇), Yilaha (伊拉哈镇), Shuangshan (双山镇), Duobaoshan (多宝山镇), Haijiang (海江镇), Qianjin (前进镇), Zhangfu (长福镇), Keluo (科洛镇), Huolongmen (霍龙门镇)

5 townships

- Linjiang (临江乡), Lianxing (联兴乡), Baiyun (白云乡), Taxi (塔溪乡), Changjiang (长江乡)
