= Geumosan (South Gyeongsang) =

Mountain in South Korea

Highest point
- Elevation: 766 m (2,513 ft)

Geography
- Location: South Gyeongsang Province, South Korea

Geumosan (Korean: 금오산) is a mountain of South Gyeongsang Province, southeastern South Korea. It has an elevation of 766 metres.

== See also ==
- List of mountains of Korea
