= Miryang =

City in South Gyeongsang, South Korea

Coordinates: 35°30′N 128°45′E

- Municipal City
- Panoramic view of Miryang

- Flag Emblem of Miryang

- Location in South Korea
- Country: South Korea
- Region: Yeongnam
- Administrative divisions: 2 eup, 9 myeon, 5 dong

Government
  - mayor: An Byeong-gu (안병구)

Area
  - Total: 799.03 km^{2} (308.51 sq mi)

Population (September 2024)
  - Total: 100,802
  - Density: 140.9/km^{2} (365/sq mi)
  - Dialect: Gyeongsang
- Time zone: UTC+9 (Korea Standard Time)
- Area code: +82-55

Korean name
- Hangul: 밀양시
- Hanja: 密陽市
- RR: Miryang-si
- MR: Miryang-si

Miryang (Korean: 밀양) is a city in South Gyeongsang Province, South Korea. It is bordered by Changnyeong to the west, Cheongdo to the north, Ulsan to the east, and Yangsan, Gimhae, and Changwon to the south. The city's symbols include the Korean magpie, the pine tree, and the royal azalea.

The recorded history of Miryang dates back to the Samhan period, when it was known as Mirimidongguk. Due to its strategic location near the Nakdong River, it played an important role from the Silla period onward. It served as a key station on the Great Yeongnam Road during the later Joseon Dynasty and, in the 20th century, became a stop on the Gyeongbu Line railroad connecting Busan to Seoul. Today, Miryang remains an important stop on that line and is the only city between Busan and Daegu served by KTX express trains.

Miryang is renowned throughout Korea for the Arirang and for the view from the Yeongnamnu Pavilion, a subject of numerous poems from the Joseon period. Other notable landmarks include Eoreumgol and the Pyochungsa. Historical figures from the city include the 15th-century Neo-Confucian scholar Kim Chong-jik and the 16th-century warrior-monk Songun Yu Jeong. The city government actively preserves the memory of these figures, as well as other local cultural traditions such as the legend of Arang.

== History ==
During the Samhan period, Miryang may have been part of the territory of Mirimidongguk, one of the Byeonhan tribes mentioned in the San guo zhi. It is believed to have later come under the rule of Geumgwan Gaya before being annexed by Silla. The Samguk sagi records that Mirimidongguk was annexed by Jijeung of Silla in 505. At that time, it was known as Chuhwa-gun (推火郡). During the 8th century, as part of a general renaming reform carried out by King Gyeongdeok, the name was changed to Milseong-gun (密城郡).

In the Goryeo period, Miryang was elevated to the status of a ju by Seongjong of Goryeo. In 1194, Miryang was the site of a major battle between royal forces and a large rebel army led by Kim Sami of Cheongdo and Hyosim of Ulsan, in which more than 7,000 rebels were killed. During the late 13th century, under Chungnyeol of Goryeo, local residents led by Jo Cheon rose up against the government. In retaliation, Mil-ju was demoted to a tributary village of Gyeongju (then called Gyerim) and later became a hyeon. Under King Gongyang, it was elevated to the status of a bu.

With the beginning of the Joseon period, the area first became known by its modern name, Miryang. Initially demoted from bu to gun (county) by King Taejo, it was later raised back to bu and renamed. Under Taejo's son, Taejong of Joseon, it was again demoted to a gun. Subsequently, it became a dohobu, or military protectorate, and in 1895 it reverted to gun status, which it retained until the late 20th century.

Under the Japanese rule, Miryang was a center of resistance within the Korean independence movement. During the March First Movement of 1919, approximately 13,500 Miryang residents participated in peaceful demonstrations supporting independence, leading to the "Miryang massacre", in which 150 civilians were killed by occupation troops. In November 1920, independence activist Choe Su-bong detonated two bombs at the Miryang police station, destroying the building. He attempted suicide but survived, later being executed while his accomplices were imprisoned.

In 1989, the city center was separated from the surrounding county and designated Miryang-si (Miryang City). In 1995, it was reunited with the outlying areas, and the entire region became known as Miryang-si as part of a nationwide reorganization of local government.

Miryang later gained national attention as the location of a gang rape incident in 2004.

== Geography and climate ==
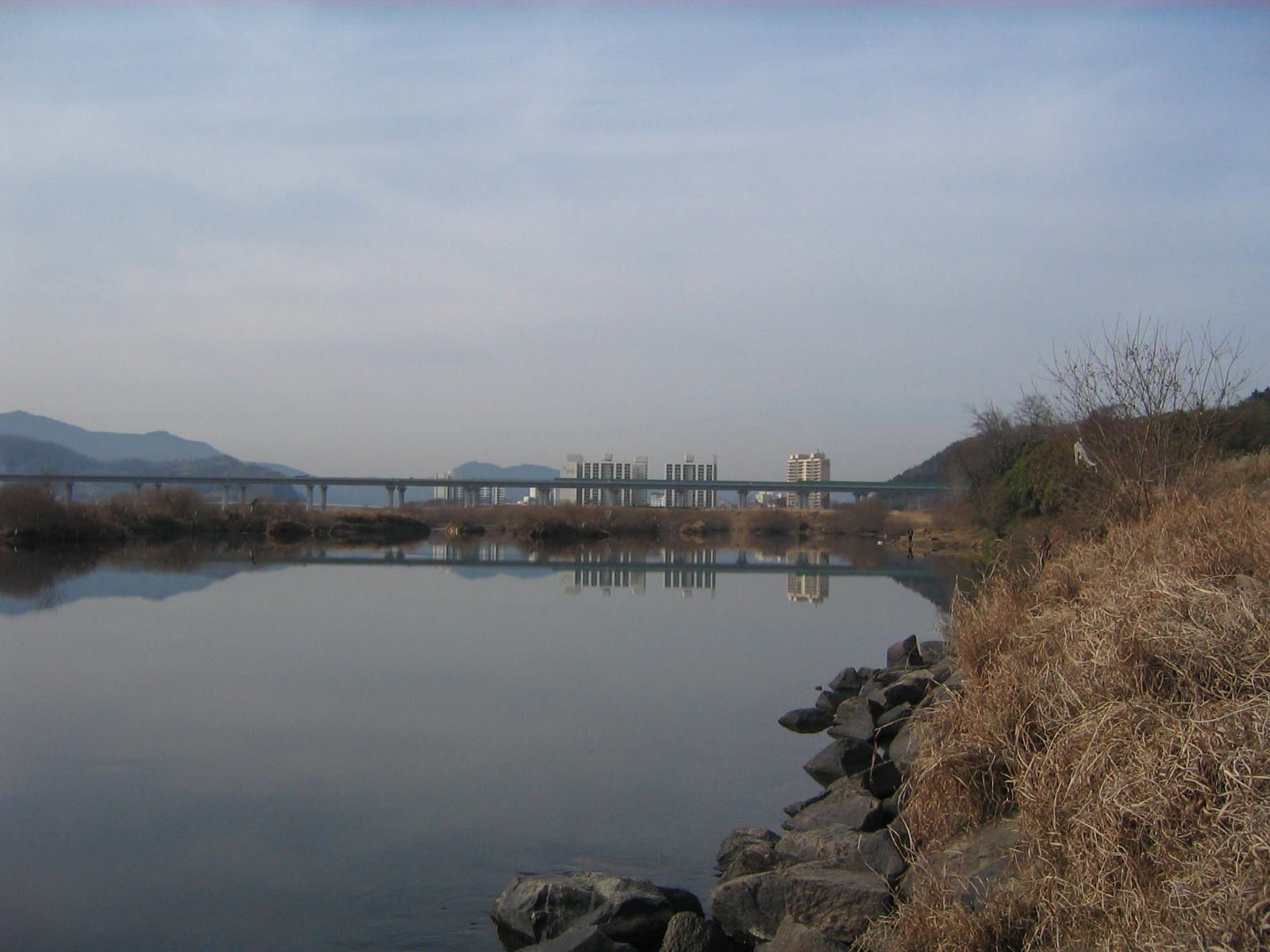
Miryang city centre as seen from across the Miryang River.

Miryang's geography is heavily influenced by the Miryang and Nakdong Rivers. The entire city lies within the Nakdong River basin, with the Nakdong forming Miryang's southern boundary. The terrain generally slopes from the high peaks of the Yeongnam Alps in the northeast to the Nakdong Valley in the southwest. Much of the city is drained by the Miryang River, which rises in western Ulsan and flows through the city center before joining the Nakdong at Samnangjin. Other areas are drained by Nakdong tributaries such as the Naejincheon.

South of the city center, the Miryang River valley widens into a fertile plain. This area, including large parts of Samnangjin-eup, Sangnam-myeon, and Hanam-eup, serves as a regional breadbasket and is devoted primarily to rice farming. In Hanam-eup, the plain merges with another that runs along the Nakdong.

Like much of the Yeongnam region, the landscape is rugged, with numerous craggy hills and low mountains. The highest peak in Miryang is Gajisan (1,240 m, 4,070 ft), located on the northern border. Other high peaks include Hwaaksan and Cheonhwangsan (also called Jaeyaksan), Maneosan, and Cheontaesan. Steep mountain valleys are common and are often used for reservoirs that supply irrigation and drinking water, including Miryang Lake and Antae Lake.

=== Climate ===
Miryang has a relatively mild, temperate climate. The average wind speed is about 1.4 m/s (5.0 km/h; 3.1 mph), the average annual temperature is 14.4 °C (57.9 °F), and total annual rainfall in 2004 measured 1,377.4 mm (54.23 in).

The northern mountains provide some protection from cold winds and severe weather, but the city is relatively vulnerable to tropical storms approaching from the south. The Miryang and Nakdong valleys are prone to flooding during typhoons and the monsoon season, although other natural disasters are uncommon.

Climate data for Miryang (1991–2020 normals, extremes 1973–present)
Month	Jan	Feb	Mar	Apr	May	Jun	Jul	Aug	Sep	Oct	Nov	Dec	Year
Record high °C (°F)	18.1 (64.6)	23.7 (74.7)	26.2 (79.2)	31.1 (88.0)	36.6 (97.9)	36.1 (97.0)	39.4 (102.9)	39.0 (102.2)	36.5 (97.7)	30.8 (87.4)	26.1 (79.0)	19.9 (67.8)	39.4 (102.9)
Mean daily maximum °C (°F)	7.4 (45.3)	9.9 (49.8)	14.7 (58.5)	20.7 (69.3)	25.5 (77.9)	28.3 (82.9)	30.4 (86.7)	31.3 (88.3)	27.4 (81.3)	22.6 (72.7)	15.9 (60.6)	9.3 (48.7)	20.3 (68.5)
Daily mean °C (°F)	0.5 (32.9)	2.8 (37.0)	7.7 (45.9)	13.2 (55.8)	18.3 (64.9)	22.3 (72.1)	25.6 (78.1)	26.1 (79.0)	21.5 (70.7)	15.2 (59.4)	8.4 (47.1)	2.1 (35.8)	13.6 (56.5)
Mean daily minimum °C (°F)	−5.4 (22.3)	−3.6 (25.5)	0.9 (33.6)	6.0 (42.8)	11.6 (52.9)	17.3 (63.1)	21.8 (71.2)	22.0 (71.6)	16.6 (61.9)	9.0 (48.2)	2.1 (35.8)	−3.6 (25.5)	7.9 (46.2)
Record low °C (°F)	−15.8 (3.6)	−15.6 (3.9)	−10.4 (13.3)	−3.9 (25.0)	1.0 (33.8)	7.4 (45.3)	13.4 (56.1)	12.9 (55.2)	5.3 (41.5)	−2.7 (27.1)	−8.1 (17.4)	−14.5 (5.9)	−15.8 (3.6)
Average precipitation mm (inches)	21.2 (0.83)	33.0 (1.30)	59.0 (2.32)	90.5 (3.56)	106.7 (4.20)	155.9 (6.14)	259.3 (10.21)	240.6 (9.47)	144.4 (5.69)	53.3 (2.10)	40.1 (1.58)	22.6 (0.89)	1,226.6 (48.29)
Average precipitation days (≥ 0.1 mm)	3.9	4.7	6.8	8.2	8.6	9.5	13.5	12.8	8.7	4.3	5.1	4.0	90.1
Average snowy days	1.8	1.5	0.5	0.1	0.0	0.0	0.0	0.0	0.0	0.0	0.3	1.5	5.6
Average relative humidity (%)	58.9	56.7	58.3	59.7	64.0	69.5	77.3	76.7	74.7	71.1	68.0	61.8	66.4
Mean monthly sunshine hours	188.0	184.6	208.2	214.2	225.9	175.5	151.5	172.7	160.6	197.4	174.4	183.9	2,236.9
Percentage possible sunshine	61.5	59.6	55.3	56.0	52.6	42.5	36.2	44.2	44.7	59.5	58.6	62.1	51.7
Source: Korea Meteorological Administration (snow and percent sunshine 1981–2010)

== Administrative divisions ==
Miryang is divided into 16 primary divisions: 2 eup (large towns), 5 dong (city precincts or neighborhoods), and 9 myeon (rural townships). Several of the dong are further subdivided, so that the city center comprises a total of eight legal dong. The eup and myeon are also divided into 265 administrative and 119 legal ri.

District	Population	Area (km^{2})	Population density	Number of administrative ri or tong
Samnangjin-eup	8,784	78.37	112.1	31
Hanam-eup	9,762	37.09	263.2	33
Bubuk-myeon	7,467	55.31	135.0	22
Sangnam-myeon	11,719	56.11	208.9	31
Sangdong-myeon	3,423	52.01	65.8	18
Sannae-myeon	4,205	107.49	39.1	23
Sanoe-myeon	3,143	35.41	88.8	19
Danjang-myeon	4,542	142.12	32.0	24
Chodong-myeon	4,135	48.45	85.3	24
Muan-myeon	6,646	100.33	66.2	28
Cheongdo-myeon	2,214	57.44	38.5	12
Gyo-dong	8,055	4.61		8
Naeil-dong	5,309	12.07	1,747.2	10
Naei-dong	10,347	3.06	3,381.4	12
Gagok-dong	10,509	6.21	1,692.2	13
Sammun-dong	15,936	2.93	5,438.9	14

== Government and politics ==
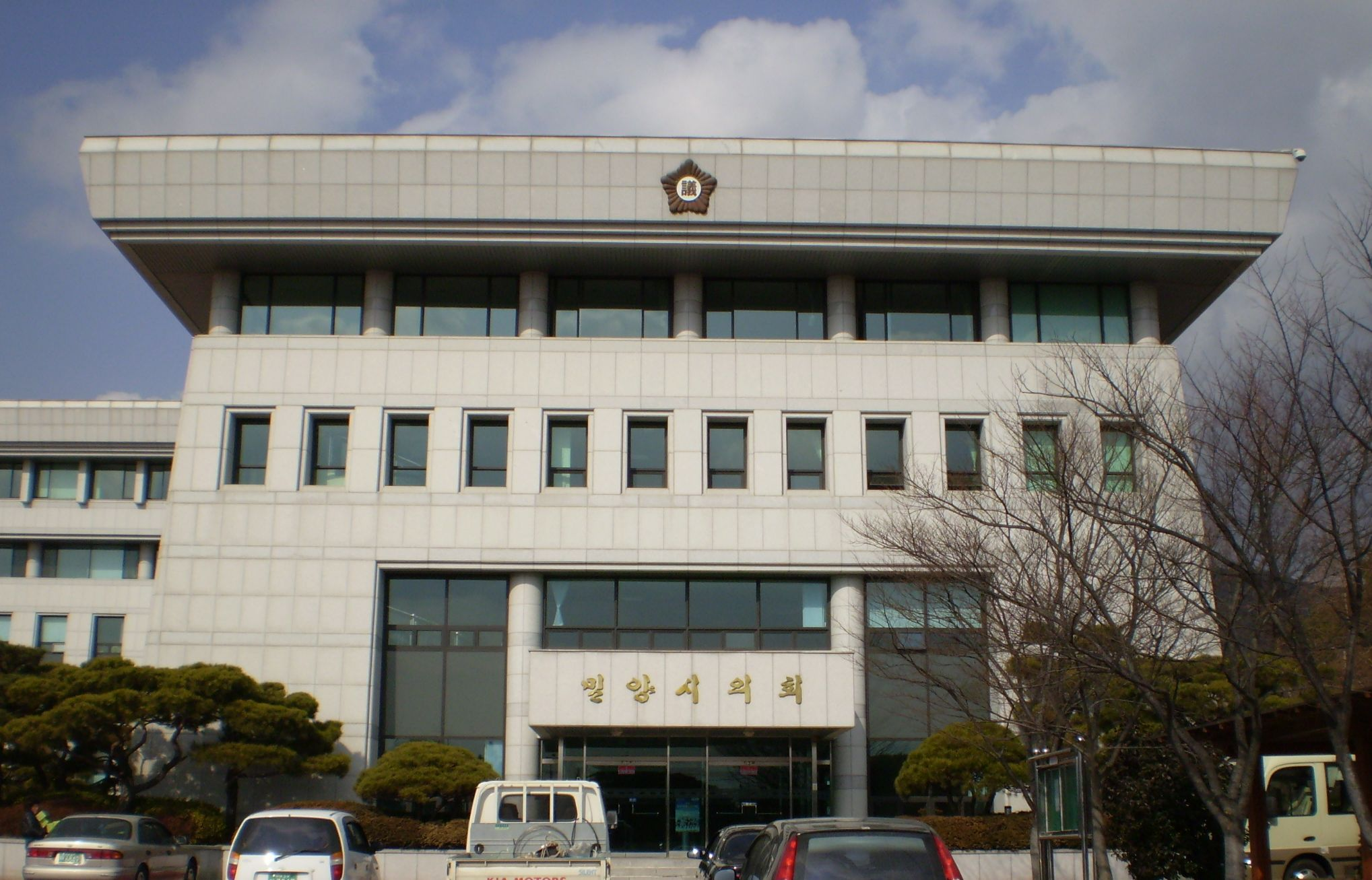
Miryang assembly building.

Like other cities and counties in South Korea, Miryang enjoys a limited degree of local autonomy. Since 1995, both the mayor and the city council have been directly elected by residents.

The current mayor is Park Il-ho, a member of the United Future Party, who took office on June 30, 2014.

== Economy ==
Miryang’s economy benefits from its central location and its reputation as a tourist destination. Agriculture also remains important, particularly in the surrounding rural districts. The Miryang River valley supports extensive rice cultivation, while livestock farming is more common in the higher, hillier areas.

== Transportation ==
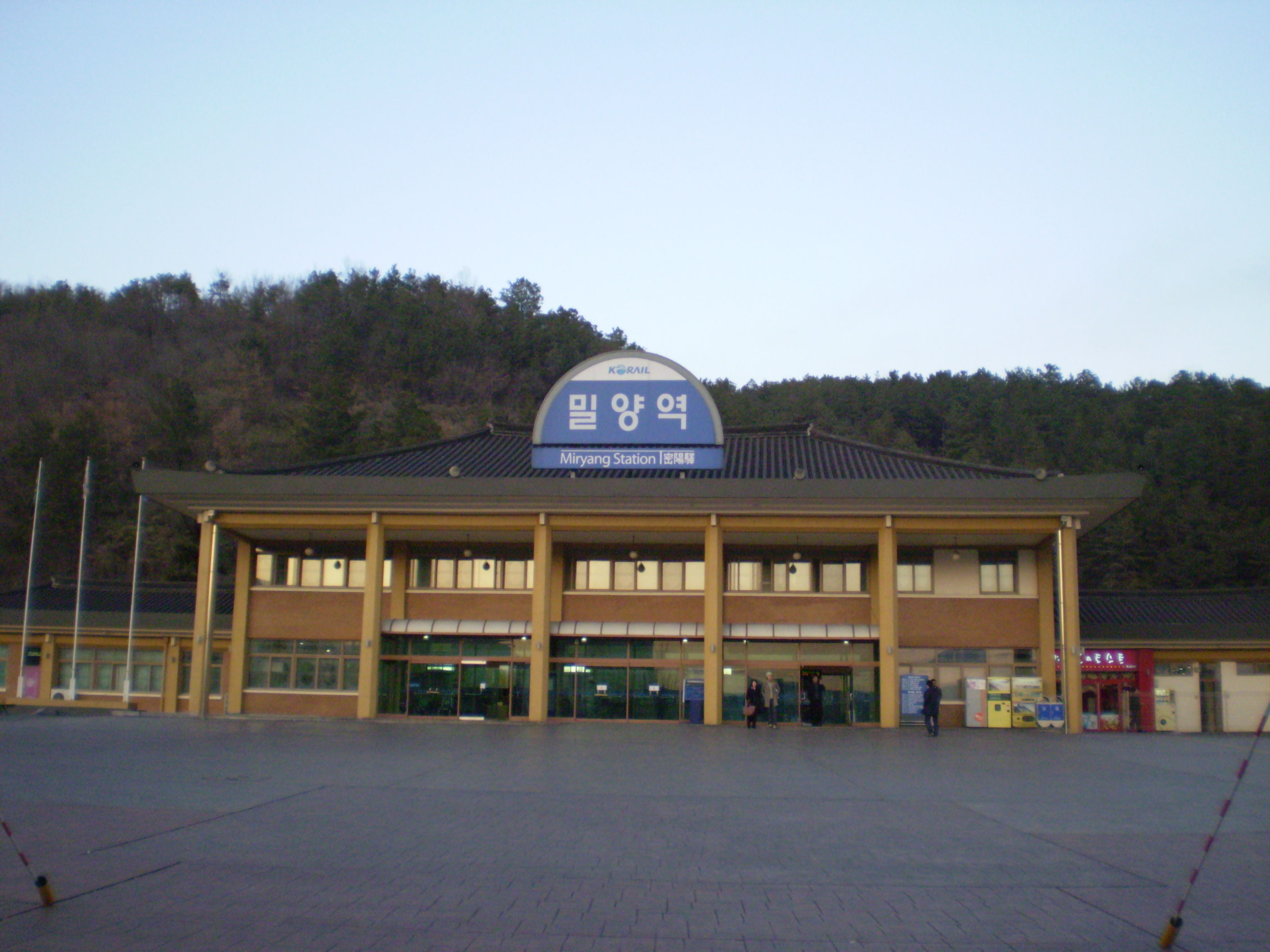
Miryang station

Located midway between Daegu and Busan, Miryang is well-connected to both by road and rail. It is served by two exits on the Daegu-Busan Expressway and several national and local highways. It also lies on both the Gyeongbu Line (Seoul-Busan) and the Gyeongjeon Line (to Masan), with the northern terminus of the Gyeongjeon Line located just north of Samnangjin, near the confluence of the Nakdong and Miryang Rivers. It is the only city between Daegu and Busan currently served by the KTX express train.

In addition to Miryang Station in the city center, outlying areas are served by Samnangjin Station and Sangdong Station on the Gyeongbu Line, as well as Nakdonggang Station on the Gyeongjeon Line. These outlying stations are served primarily by a limited number of Mugunghwa-ho passenger trains. With the exception of Nakdonggang Station, all Miryang stations also handle freight. Sangdong Station is the most active freight hub, shipping 74,762 tons of freight in 2004.

== Culture ==
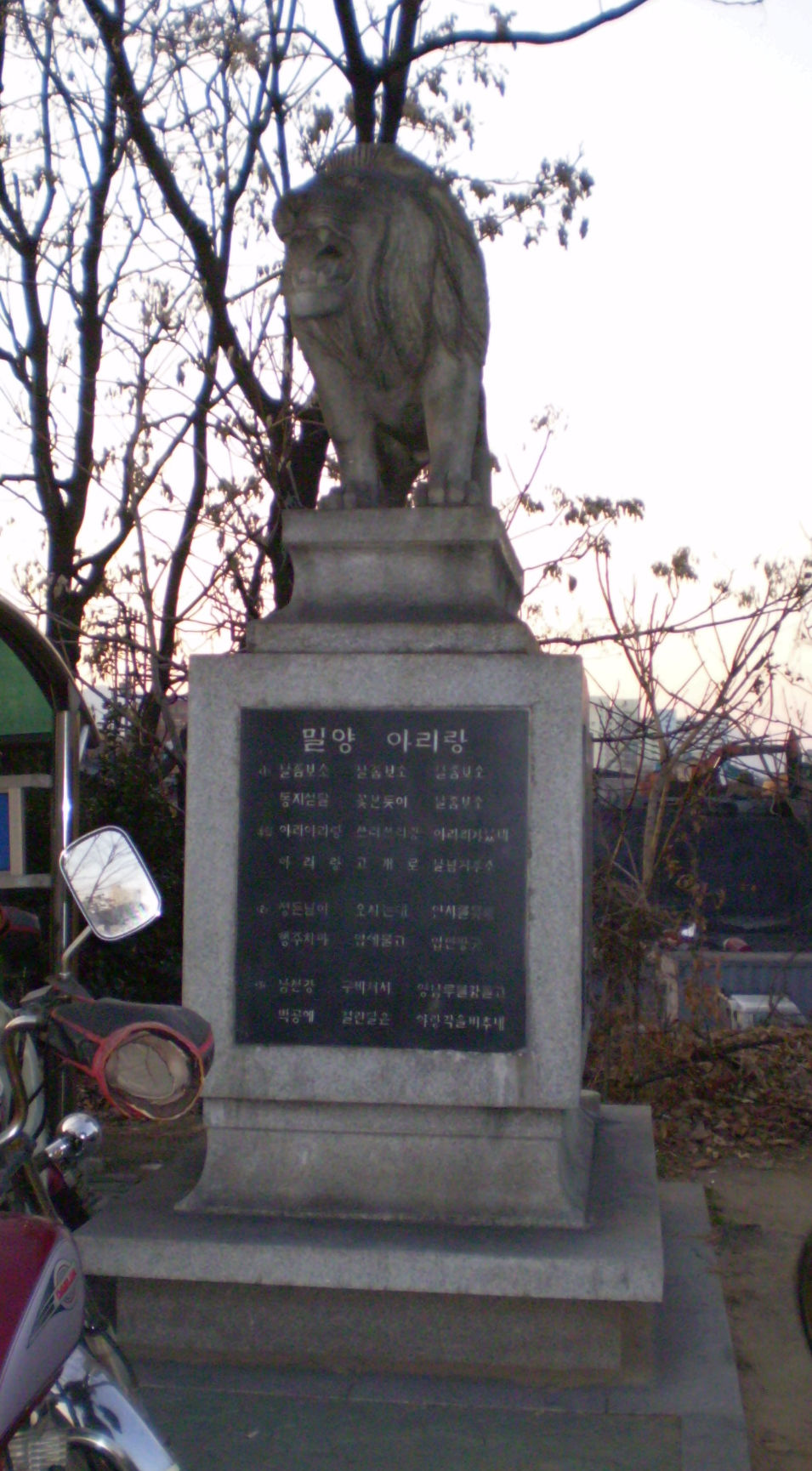
Statue commemorating the Miryang arirang.

Miryang is known as the home of the Miryang Arirang, which is sometimes considered to be close to the original form of the Korean folk song Arirang. The song is believed to have drawn its name from the local folktale of Arang. The Miryang Arirang Festival is held every May to preserve and promote this tradition. Other preserved elements of traditional Korean culture include Baekjung performances.

Residents of Miryang speak a variant of the Gyeongsang dialect of the Korean language. Linguistic studies have contrasted the Miryang dialect with that of Changwon, particularly in terms of pitch patterns.

Miryang is also well known as the setting and filming location of the 2007 film Miryang (released in English-language markets under the title Secret Sunshine).

== Education ==
Education in Miryang dates back to the Goryeo period, when a hyanggyo, a government-run village school, was built in what is now Gyo-dong. This school, once renowned for its size, remained operational through the Joseon period, though it was gradually supplemented by private seodang and seowon academies. These institutions trained young men for the royal civil service examinations, a system that lasted until the Gabo Reforms of 1894.

Today, as elsewhere in South Korea, compulsory public education in Miryang is provided through middle school, and nearly all students continue on to high school. The city's education system is overseen by the Miryang Office of Education, which operates under the Gyeongsangnam-do Provincial Office of Education and ultimately the Ministry of Education, which sets the national curriculum.

There are 23 elementary schools, 14 middle schools, and 8 high schools in Miryang. Private supplementary education is widely available through hagwons, most of which are located in the city center, with a smaller number in the outlying towns.

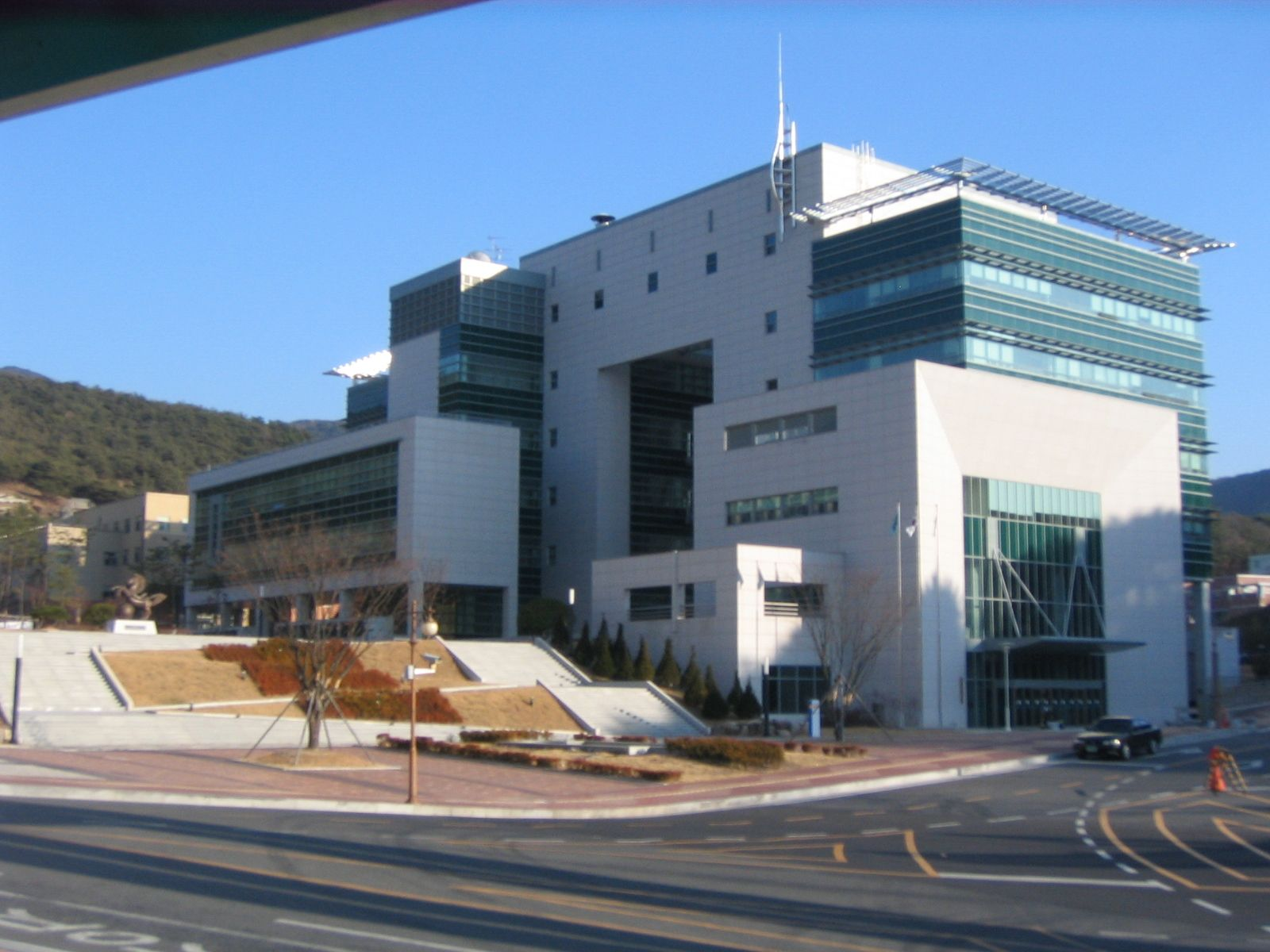
Main administration building at the Miryang campus of Pusan National University.

The city's sole institution of higher education is the Miryang campus of Pusan National University. The campus primarily focuses on science and technology, housing the College of Nano Science and Technology and the College of Biological Sciences. It is located in northern Samnangjin-eup, about 9 kilometres (5.6 mi) from downtown Miryang. A branch campus, formerly the main campus, is also situated near the city center. These two campuses merged with Pusan National University in 2006, having previously constituted Miryang National University, which traced its origins to 1923.

== Tourism ==
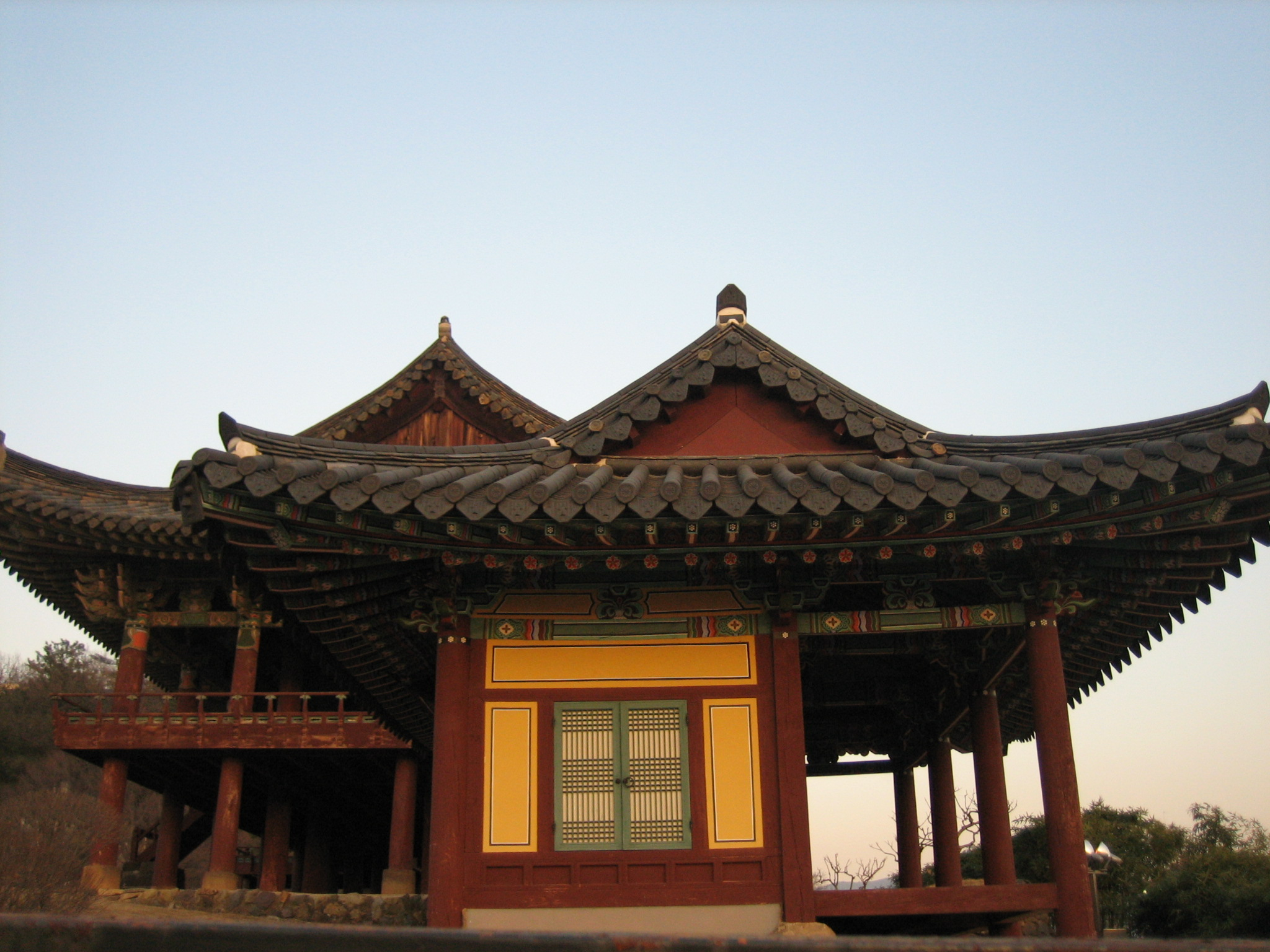
Yeongnamnu

Miryang has long been renowned for its natural scenery. The Yeongnamnu Pavilion, overlooking the Miryang River, is mentioned in multiple pieces from the Joseon Dynasty. The city's northeastern region forms part of the Yeongnam Alps, portions of which are protected within Gajisan Provincial Park. Notable natural attractions include the "Ice Valley" of Eoreumgol, also located in the northeast.

The city is also home to many historic landmarks. These include several seowon or Confucian academies, such as Yerim Seowon, dedicated to the Neo-Confucian scholar Kim Chong-jik, and Pyochung Seowon, the only seowon constructed within Pyochungsa Temple. South Korean National Treasure No. 75 is also located there.

Another notable site is Yangyangji, a reservoir originally built during the Silla period to irrigate rice paddies. Though it has lost its original agricultural function due to the construction of a larger reservoir, it is now a popular tourist attraction known for its picturesque scenery.

== Twin towns – sister cities ==
Miryang is twinned with:

- Yasugi, Shimane, Japan (1990)
- Ōmihachiman, Shiga, Japan (1994)
- Benxi, Liaoning, China (1998)
- Namwon, North Jeolla, South Korea (1999)
- Ulan Hot, Inner Mongolia, China (1999)
- New Milford, New Jersey, United States (2004)
- Handan, Hebei, China (2004)
- Setouchi, Okayama, Japan (2006)
- Nanping, Fujian, China (2016)

== See also ==
- Secret Sunshine
- List of cities in South Korea

== Bibliography ==
- Lee Hong-jik (이홍직) (1983). 새國史事典 (Sae guksa sajeon, New encyclopedia of Korean history). Seoul: Kyohaksa.
- Miryang City (2005). 밀양시 통계연보 (Miryang-si tonggye yeonbo, Statistical yearbook of Miryang City). Archived from the original on May 22, 2006.
- Pak Byeong-ryeon (박병련), ed. (2004). 남명학파와 영남우도의 사림 (Nammyeonghakpa-wa Yeongnamudo-ui sarim, The Nammyeong school and the Sarim of right-hand Yeongnam Province). Seoul: Yemoon Seowon. ISBN 978-89-7646-190-2.
