= Cheonhwangsan (South Gyeongsang and Ulsan) =

Mountain in South Korea

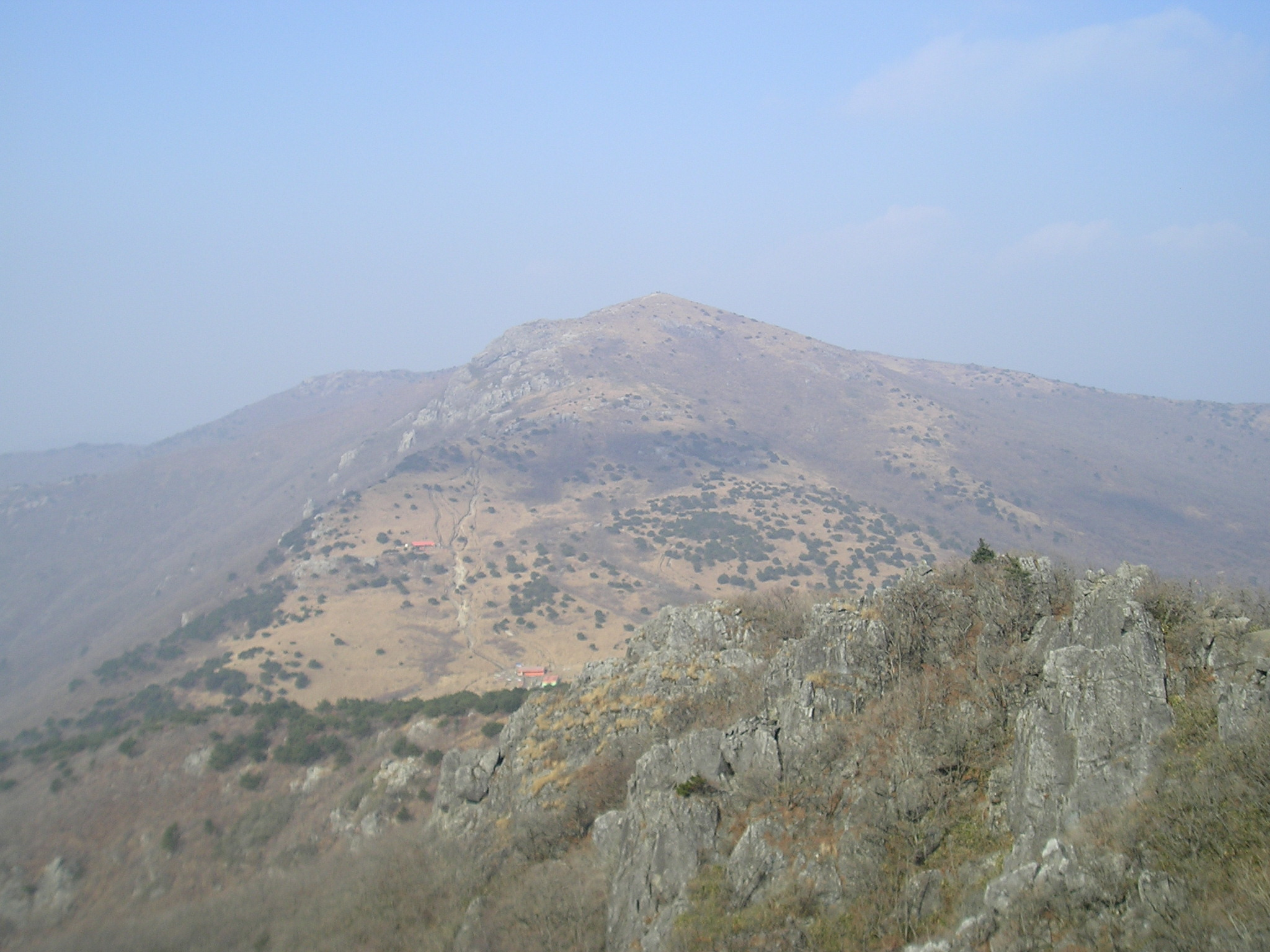

Highest point
- Elevation: 1,189 m (3,901 ft)
- Coordinates: 35°34′N 128°58′E

Geography
- Location: South Korea
- Parent range: Taebaek Mountains

Korean name
- Hangul: 천황산
- Hanja: 天皇山
- RR: Cheonhwangsan
- MR: Ch'ŏnhwangsan

Cheonhwangsan (Korean: 천황산; 天皇山) is a mountain in South Korea. It sits on the boundary between Ulsan and Miryang, in South Gyeongsang Province. Cheonhwangsan has an elevation of 1,189 m (3,901 ft). It is part of the Yeongnam Alps mountain range.

== See also ==
- List of mountains in Korea
