= Sannae-myeon, Miryang =

Sannae-myeon
- Myeon (administrative division)
- Interactive map of Sannae-myeon
- Coordinates: 35.5842°N 128.8809°E
- Country: South Korea

Area
  - Total: 107.41 km^{2} (41.47 sq mi)

Population (2011)
  - Total: 4,017
  - Density: 37.40/km^{2} (96.86/sq mi)
- Website: http://www.miryang.go.kr (in Korean)

Korean name
- Hangul: 산내면
- Hanja: 山內面
- RR: Sannae-myeon
- MR: Sannae-myŏn

Sannae-myeon is a myeon, or county, located in South Gyeongsang Province, Miryang, South Korea.

== Administrative divisions ==
Sannae-myeon is further divided into the following ri (administrative divisions):

- Imgo-ri (임고리)
- Samyang-ri (삼양리)
- Nammyeong-ri (남명리)
- Gain-ri (가인리)
- Bongui-ri (봉의리)
- Songbaek-ri (송백리)
- Yongjeon-ri (용전리)
- Wonseo-ri (원서리)

== See also ==
- Administrative divisions of South Korea
