= Cheongdo County =

Coordinates: 35°38′50″N 128°44′03″E

Cheongdo
- County
- Panoramic view of Cheongdo-eup

- Flag Emblem of Cheongdo

- Location in South Korea
- Country: South Korea
- Region: Yeongnam
- Administrative divisions: 2 eup, 7 myeon

Area
  - Total: 696.53 km^{2} (268.93 sq mi)

Population (2025)
  - Total: 40,117
  - Density: 57.44/km^{2} (148.8/sq mi)
  - Dialect: Gyeongsang

Korean name
- Hangul: 청도군
- Hanja: 淸道郡
- RR: Cheongdo-gun
- MR: Ch'ŏngdo-gun

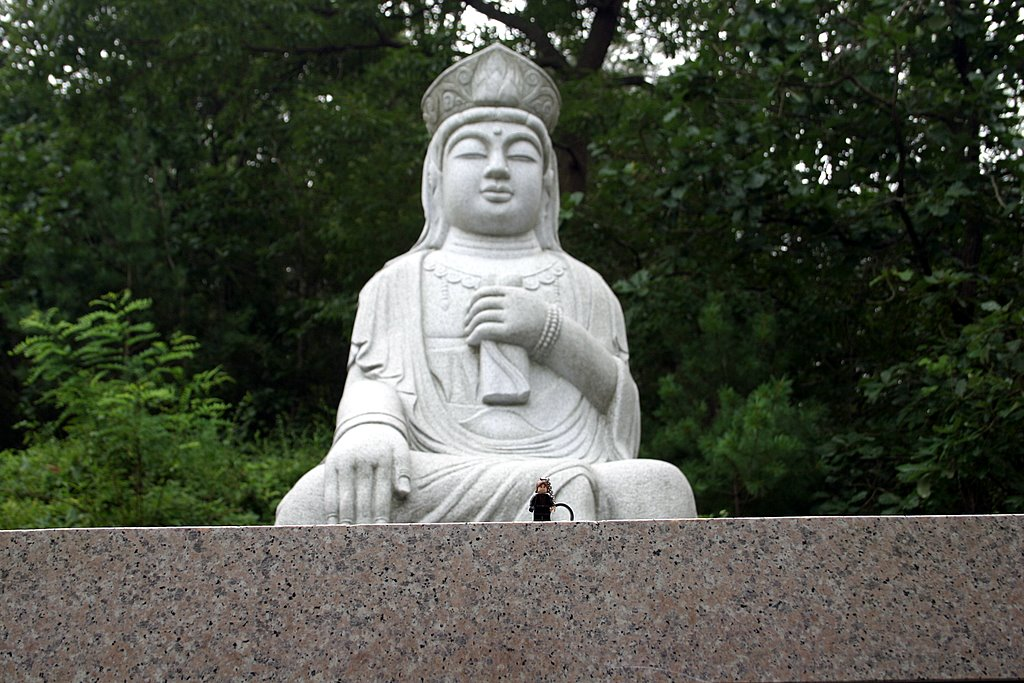
Bohyeonsa Buddha Statue

Cheongdo County (Korean: 청도군) is a county in North Gyeongsang Province, South Korea. It is connected to the national transportation grid by the Gyeongbu Line railroad and the Daegu-Busan Expressway. The seat of government is located in the center of the county, in Hwayang-eup.

In the Samhan period, Cheongdo may have been the site of the small polity of Iseoguk. It was later absorbed into Silla, and gained its current name of "Cheongdo" in 940. The county's nine subdivisions were established in 1919. The county government moved to its current location in 1961. In 1966, the New Village Movement began in Sindo 1-ri, Cheongdo-eup.

Every year Cheongdo is host to an international bullfighting festival.

The slogan for Cheongdo is "Singgreen Cheongdo."

== Administrative divisions ==
Cheongdo is divided into two eup and seven myeon, as below. These in turn are divided into 212 ri, and 668 natural villages (jayeon burak).

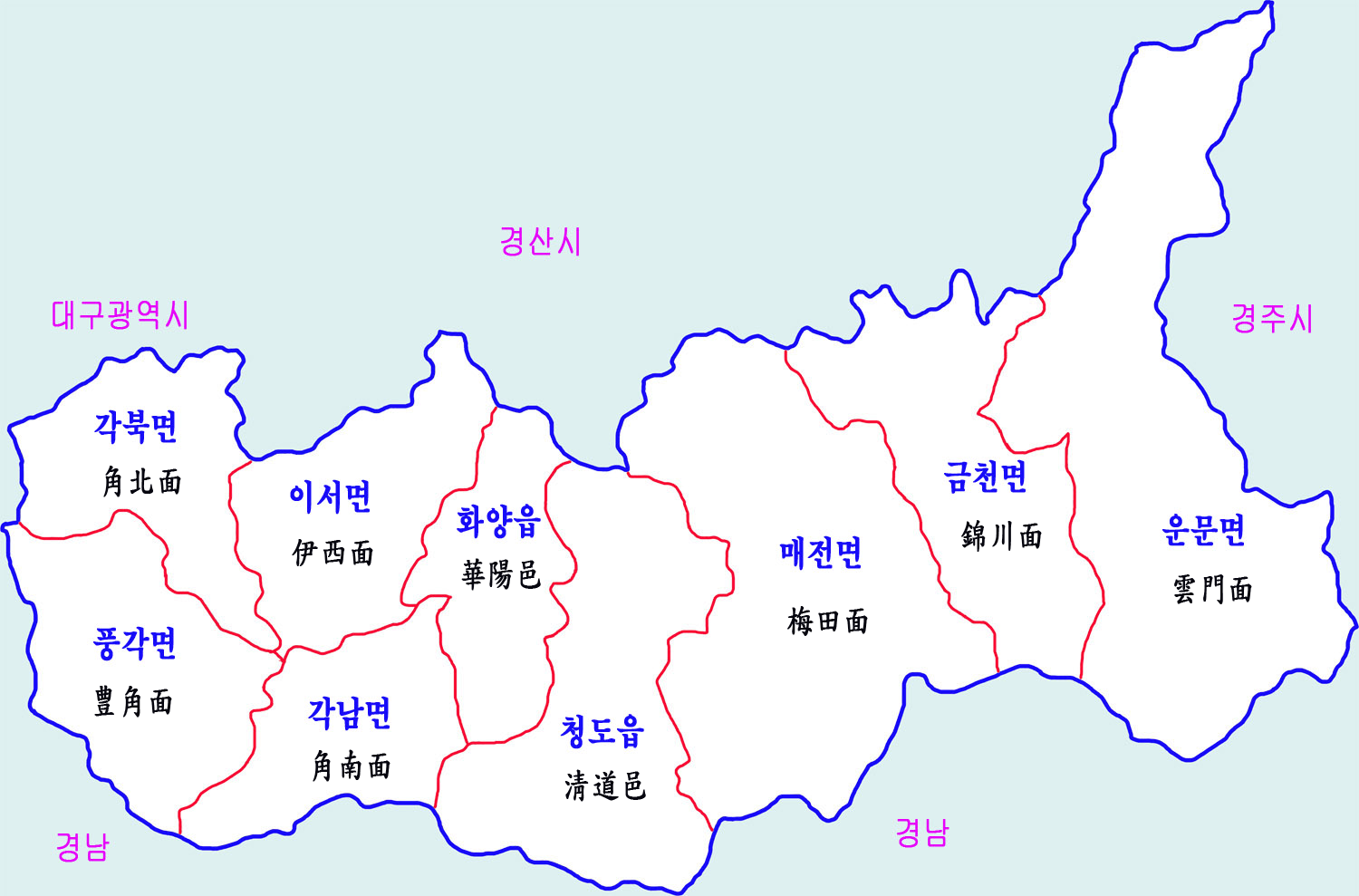
Map of Cheongdo County in Korean

Name	Hangeul	Hanja
Hwayang-eup	화양읍	華陽邑
Cheongdo-eup	청도읍	淸道邑
Gakbuk-myeon	각북면	角北面
Punggak-myeon	풍각면	豊角面
Iseo-myeon	이서면	伊西面
Gangnam-myeon	각남면	角南面
Maejeon-myeon	매전면	梅田面
Geumcheon-myeon	금천면	錦川面
Unmun-myeon	운문면	雲門面

== Twin towns – sister cities ==
Cheongdo is twinned with:

- Gangnam-gu, South Korea
- Jung-gu, South Korea
- Nenjiang, China

== Festivals ==
- Bullfighting Festival
- Persimmon (Bansi) Festival
- Lantern Festival

== Culture ==
=== Museums ===
- Cheongdo Museum

=== Monuments ===
- Cheongdo Memorial Park of Saemaeul Undong

=== Parks ===
- Unmunsan National Recreational Forest

=== experiences ===
- Seonamseowon Confucian Academy
- Cheongdo Hwarang-themed Cultural Park Auto-camping Site
- Cheongdo Bicycle Park Camping Site
- Cheongdo Rail Bike
- Cheongdo Hwarang-themed Cultural Park
- Comedy Cheolgabang Theater
- Korea Comedy Town

=== Other important spots ===
- Cheongdo Bullfighting Stadium
- Cheongdo Wine Tunnel
- Cheongdo Provence

== Architecture ==
=== Historical ===
- Songamjeongsa House
- Unmunsa Temple

== Foreigners ==
As Cheongdo is a small town, with a population that is just over 50,000, there is not a high number of foreigners. However, there are a few foreigners that are living there as English teachers through the EPIK Program. Unfortunately, it is very rare to come across a local Cheongdo resident that speaks English. Learning basic Korean is an essential for living in Cheongdo.

== Climate & Weather ==
Much like the rest of Korea, Cheongdo has four distinct seasons. Summers in Cheongdo can be extremely hot as Cheongdo is only 30 minutes away from Daegu by train. Daegu is known to be one of the hottest cities in South Korea, due to the surrounding mountains that trap all the heat.

Winters can be rather cold, reaching -15 degrees Celsius on occasion. Furthermore, the air is extremely dry during the winter time.

Both Autumn and Spring are rather mild, no extreme weather conditions for either. However, during Spring, typically in April, the air quality is very poor. It is very common to see locals protecting themselves with face masks against the "yellow dust."

== See also ==
- Geography of South Korea
- Subdivisions of South Korea
