= Hamchang =

Place in South Korea

- Panoramic view of Hamchang-eup

Korean name
- Hangul: 함창읍
- Hanja: 咸昌邑
- RR: Hamchang-eup
- MR: Hamch'ang-ŭp

Hamchang is an eup in Sangju City, North Gyeongsang province, South Korea. It comprises 30 distinct ri (the smallest South Korean administrative division), and has a population of 8,427 (from 2003 registration figures). There are two elementary schools, a middle school and a high school. Hamchang was once the capital of a small kingdom, Goryeong Gaya. Although its role today is far less central, it remains an important local town, served by intercity buses as well as the Gyeongbuk Line railroad.

== Geography ==
Hamchang is located about 19 kilometers north of the Sangju city center, and borders Jeomchon in Mungyeong City directly on the north. Within Sangju, it adjoins the local districts of Ian-myeon, Gonggeom-myeon, and Sabeol-myeon. It covers a total area of 43.37 km². Of this 16.87 km² are vacant. The vacant land is mostly mountainous, but contains no high peaks; Obong Mountain itself stands a mere 192 meters high. Hamchang's eastern border is formed by the Yeong River, which flows between Mungyeong's Yeongsun-myeon and Hamchang-eup. The Iancheon stream runs from west to east across southern Hamchang and into the Yeong, which shortly thereafter meets the Nakdong.

== History ==
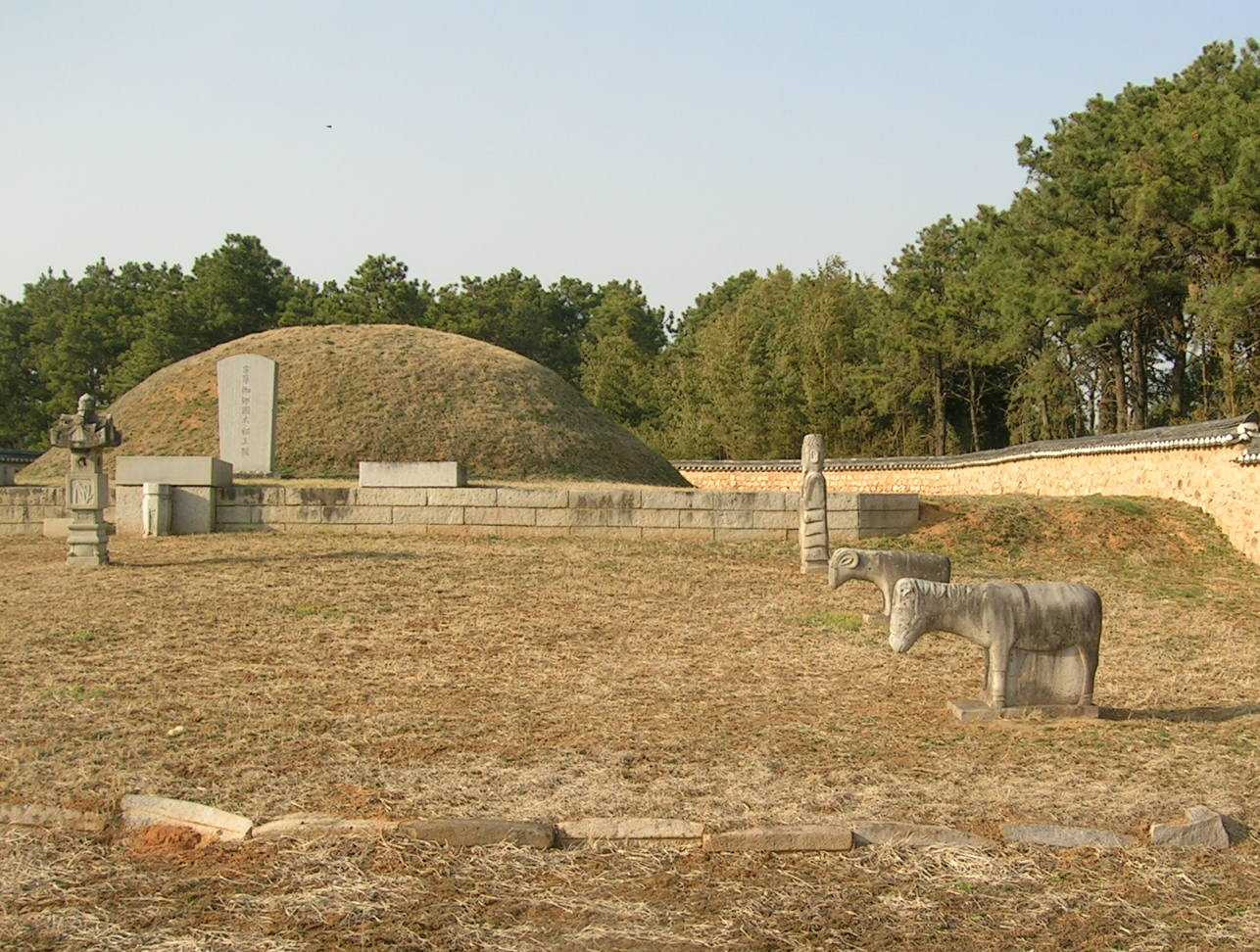
Tomb attributed to King Taejo of Goryeong Gaya, in Hamchang-eup, Sangju City.

In the early Three Kingdoms period, the small kingdom of Goryeong Gaya is traditionally supposed to have been based in Hamchang, making it by far the northernmost state of the Gaya confederacy.

The reputed tomb of Goryeong's founder, who is also the progenitor of the Hamchang Kim lineage, is located near the town center. On Obong Mountain, other tombs dating to the Three Kingdoms period have been excavated. These are sometimes associated with Sabeol-guk, a minor state which appears in early Silla records . What relation may have existed between Sabeol-guk and Goryeong Gaya, or whether they were in fact the same kingdom, is not known.

By the early 6th century, the Hamchang area was securely under Silla control. It was subsequently administered as part of the ju of Sangju. At this time, Hamchang was known by various names which appear to suggest a connection with Goryeong Gaya, such as Goreung (고릉, 古陵), Gonyeong (고녕, 古寧), and Godongnam-gun (고동람군, 古冬欖郡).

In the Goryeo period, in 964, the area became known as Hamnyeong-gun (함녕군, 咸寧郡). The name changed to the present "Hamchang" in 1018. In the Joseon period, the Hamchang area was designated as Hamchang-hyeon in 1490 and Hamchang-gun (Hamchang County) in 1895. In 1914, it became known as Hamchang-myeon and was included in Sangju County. It received its present designation as Hamchang-eup by presidential decree on December 1, 1980.
