= Haneuljae =

Mountain pass in South Korea

Coordinates: 36°49′14″N 128°6′0″E

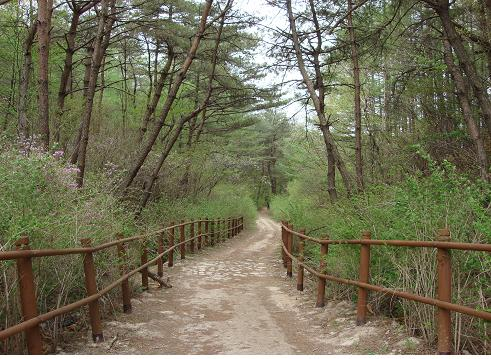

Korean name
- Hangul: 하늘재
- RR: Haneuljae
- MR: Hanŭljae

Haneuljae (Korean: 하늘재), also known as Gyerimnyeong (계립령; 鷄立嶺) is a mountain pass in the Sobaek Mountains of central South Korea. It runs between Chungju in North Chungcheong province and Mungyeong in North Gyeongsang province. Haneuljae rises to about 530 metres (1,740 ft) above sea level, between the peaks of Poam Mountain (963 m) and Juheul Mountain (1106 m).

During the Silla and Goryeo periods of Korean history, it played a role of critical importance, as the principal pathway between southeastern and southwestern Korea, and in particular between the valleys of the Han and Nakdong rivers. In the Joseon period, this role was taken over by the pass of Mungyeong Saejae, and Haneuljae fell into disuse. Today only a minor country road traverses the pass.

Seo (2001) contends that the pass played a particularly critical role in the diffusion of Buddhism into Silla from Goguryeo. The first monks bearing Buddhism to Silla came by land from the north, and Haneuljae would have been their most likely route. In addition, the area around Sangju; which would have been the first major city a traveler from the north would come to after crossing Haneuljae, became an early center of Buddhism, in contrast to the rest of Silla, which put up stiff resistance to the new faith.

The Chungju side of Haneuljae is currently protected as part of Woraksan National Park.

== See also ==
- List of mountain passes
- Baekdu-daegan
