= Gaeun =

Town in South Korea

Coordinates: 36°39′N 128°04′E

- Hangul: 가은읍
- Hanja: 加恩邑
- RR: Gaeun-eup
- MR: Kaŭn-ŭp

Gaeun (Korean: 가은) is an eup in Mungyeong, Gyeongsangbuk-do, South Korea. It was formerly a center of coal mining, but its main mine closed in the early 1990s. Tourism has grown around the old mine and railway sites. It also has a celadon kiln site dating back to the 14th–15th centuries.

== History ==
The area was called Gahae County under Silla, and it was renamed in 757 to Gaseon and made a subordinate county under Goryeong Commandery. In 940, under Taejo, the county was renamed Gaeun.

The county was later abolished in 1018 and absorbed into Sangju, then transferred to Mungyeong County in 1390, where it has remained since then.

The area sits on the southern slope of the Sobaek Mountains, where the early Silla built the old Gaeun fortress. Taejo of Goryeo and Kyŏn Hwŏn, the founder of Later Baekje, fought a battle in the area in late Silla, and a mountain road ran from Gaeun toward Boeun.

According to local tradition, Kyŏn Hwŏn was born in Galjeon-ri in southern Gaeun. The legend is tied to Geumha cave in Acha village, and a shrine was built near it in 2002.

Uibyeong general Yi Gang-nyeon, a leader of the righteous armies from the late Joseon period, was born in the village of Wanjang-ri in Gaeun, and a memorial hall to him stands at the entrance to the village. A monument to him stood in the square of the former Gaeun station as well.

Wanjang-ri also contains the site of a celadon kiln from the 14th to 15th centuries.

Gaeun gained eup status in 1973.

== Coal mining and the railway ==
The Eunseong mine ran from 1938 to 1994, when it was closed under the government's coal industry rationalization policy. After the closure, the town's population fell from close to 25,000 to under 5,000.

In 1956, a train station was opened under the name Eunseong station, later renamed Gaeun station in 1959. It handled passengers and coal shipments out of the valley, and the surviving building is reported to date back to 1955.

The 9.6 kilometres (6.0 mi) Gaeun Line was a coal-transport branch of the Mungyeong Line. When the mine closed, the line lost its purpose, and the last passenger train ran on 31 March 1995, with the station closing in July of the same year. The line was formally abolished in 2004.

In December 2016, the station was registered as modern cultural heritage, and was subsequently turned into a cafe that drew about 900 monthly visitors in 2018.

In 1999, the mine site was converted into the Mungyeong Coal Museum, covering how coal forms and is mined and displaying a steam locomotive and a briquette machine. Part of the site also recreates miners' housing quarters, where the workers lived with their families.

== Landmarks and local life ==
The Ajagae market is a traditional five-day market held on dates ending in 4 and 9. The Gaeun area was the base of Kyŏn Hwŏn and his father, Ajagae.

Rock inscriptions in Seonyudong Valley, in Wanjang-ri along the border with Goesan County, are traditionally attributed to the Silla scholar Ch'oe Ch'iwŏn. The valley is a summer destination, with a walking trail starting near the Yi Gang-nyeon memorial hall.

The Yeong River flows past Gaeun on its way to the Nakdong River.

== See also ==
- Geography of South Korea
- Subdivisions of South Korea
