= Park In-won =

South Korean politician and businessman (born 1936)

- Hangul: 박인원
- Hanja: 朴仁遠
- RR: Bak Inwon
- MR: Pak Inwŏn

Park In-won
- Born: October 9, 1936 (age 89)
- Education: Dankook University - Diploma in law
- Occupations: politician and businessman

Park In-won (Korean: 박인원; born October 9, 1936) was the third mayor of Mungyeong, South Korea. He is an independent, without formal affiliation to any political party. He was elected to the post on June 13, 2002, and completed his term in June 2006.

Park received his elementary schooling in Mungyeong, at Jeomchon's Hoseonam Elementary School, but completed his subsequent education in Daegu. He graduated from high school in 1955, and acquired a diploma in law at Dankook University in 1957. Subsequently, he worked as a venture capitalist.
