= Mungyeong-eup =

Place in South Korea

- Hangul: 문경읍
- Hanja: 聞慶邑
- RR: Mungyeong-eup
- MR: Mun'gyŏng-ŭp

Mungyeong-eup (Korean: 문경읍) is an eup in Mungyeong city in Gyeongsangbuk-do. It was formerly the seat of government of Mungyeong County, until its merger with Jeomchon in 1995 to form Mungyeong city. The eup contains the provincial park of Mungyeong Saejae. It also takes in a strip of the southern reaches of Woraksan National Park, including the once-busy mountain pass of Haneuljae. Other wild areas include the mountains of Bongmyeongsan and Seongjubong. The urban part of the eup contains a number of tourist hotels as well as the spa Mungyeong-oncheon.

Principal agricultural products of Mungyeong-eup are apples and shiitake mushrooms (표고버섯). It's also the home of a number of ceramic studios, and a ceramic museum.

Highways No. 3 and 34 run through the eup as does the expressway No. 45. Trains no longer run here; nearest access to the railroad is now in Jeomchon.

== Population ==
(as of 2009):

- Total population: 7,646
- Males: 3,752
- Females: 3,894
- Number of households: 3,308
- Number of foreigners: 39 (5 male, 34 female)
