= Andong (disambiguation) =

Andong may refer to:

- Andong, city in Yeongnam, South Korea
- Andong Dam, South Korea
- Dandong, formerly named Andong until 1965, city in Liaoning, China
- Andong Province, a former province of China
- Andong Duhufu, military government established by the Chinese Tang dynasty to rule portions of the Korean Peninsula
- Mount Andong, a mountain in Java, Indonesia
