= Dae-Ho Eom =

South Korean composer (born 1972)

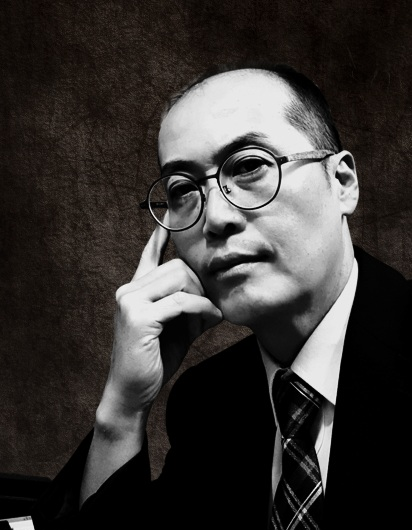
- After the Geojedo Suite was released, composer Dae-Ho Eom

Background information
- Born: May 22, 1972 (age 54); Mungyeong, South Korea
- Genres: Contemporary classical
- Occupations: Composer, Philosopher

- Dae-Ho Eom
- Hangul: 엄대호
- Hanja: 嚴大號
- RR: Eom Daeho
- MR: Ŏm Taeho

Dae-Ho Eom (Korean: 엄대호; Hanja: 嚴大號; born May 22, 1972, in the lunar calendar) is a South Korean musician, philosopher, and composer of contemporary classical music.

== Biography ==
Eom is a member of the Yeongwol Eom clan, and he was born in Gaeun, Mungyeong, North Gyeongsang Province, where he spent his early life. He attended Gaeun Elementary School and Gaeun Middle School in Gaeun-eup, Mungyeong-gun, and then Munchang High School in Mungyeong-si. He graduated from Kyungil University in Gyeongsan with a degree in computer engineering, and then graduated from Daegu Institute of the Arts' Department of Piano. He then served as vice president of the Korean National Music Association, a life-long member of the "Changakhoe", a member of NACUSA (National Association of Composers/USA), executive director of the Eom Dae-ho Foundation since 2018, and director of the Korean Music Critics Association since 2022. It has been done.

He founded the Fantaga music format in 2008, and in 2022, he was selected as a "Korean classical music pioneer" by the Westminster Conservatory of Music in the United States, and "Song of Waheon" from the chamber music suite <Geojedo suite> was performed at Rider University. There are four composers selected, including South and North Korea. These are the late Kim Seong-tae (professor emeritus at Seoul National University), the late) Kim Sun-nam (composer who defected to North Korea), the late) Isang Yun (contemporary musician), and Dae-Ho Eom (contemporary musician).

He composed various classical music using modern music techniques, including the opera <Jesus Christ>, released several piano albums and electric guitar albums, and published music papers.

"Composer Dae-Ho Eom's new attempt is giving great stimulation to the world music world. The new style he created, 'Fantaga', is a groundbreaking style that every composer should try at least once. In particular, his deep faith and pious spirit are reflected in his music. "- Jeon In-pyeong (Professor Emeritus at Chung-Ang University, President of the Korean Music Critics Association)

“Dae-Ho Eom’s unique creations led him to be selected as a contemporary musician by the Westminster Conservatory in the United States, following composer Isang Yun."

"Dae-Ho Eom's genius in composition is well known in the United States and Sweden, but in Korea, he is just a trying composer. Dae-Ho Eom is Rilke's 'Autumn Day', which calls for bringing in a little more southern sunlight to fully ripen grapes, or Kim Kwang-gyun's 'Chuil Lyrics', which draws a lonely semicircle beyond the curtain of a slanted landscape and sinks into it. We have passed through the late autumn scenery where ‘(秋日抒情)’ endures. In the early winter, we live warmly in this world with a warm heart."- Genius composer Dae-Ho Eom's 'JESUS CHRIST' composition collection

“His original compositions are extremely intimate, atonal music that excludes too slow or extreme modernity, but uses the theme of tonal music as it progresses." – Jang Seok-yong (Chairman of the Korean Association of Critics)

“Dae-Ho Eom, a modern music composer, created the musical form “Fantaga" and applied it to his own songs, creating a new wave in the modern music world, instilling aesthetic elements in difficult modern music and creating a gateway to spectacular music leading the 21st century. "- Jeong Soon-young (composer, music critic, winner of the 43rd ‘Best Artist of the Year Award’)

“Composer Dae-Ho Eom, who has constantly thought about righteousness and is presenting and perfecting a new paradigm in the domestic composition world by developing a new world of works that reflects the deep inner self of the abyss" – Sunhwa Kim (『Review』 Editor-in-Chief)

== List of works ==
=== Collection of works (book) ===
- 『12 Violin Fantaga』 (Dae-Ho Eom Foundation, 2008)
- 『Geojedo Suite』 (Dae-Ho Eom Foundation, 2018)
- 『Piano Works released 2011 – 2013 album』 (Dae-Ho Eom Foundation, 2020)
- 『Symphony No.1 & No.2』 (Dae-Ho Eom Foundation, 2020)
- 『Ben-Hur Ballet Suite for string quartet』 (Dae-Ho Eom Foundation, 2020)
- 『Ben-Hur Ballet Suite for orchestra』 (Sumin Publishing, 2021)
- 『Violin Concerto No.1 & No.2』 (Dae-Ho Eom Foundation, 2021)
- 『Symphony No.3 "ΙΧΘΥΣ"』 (Sumin Publishing, 2022)
- 『Symphony No.4 "Noah's Ark"』 (Sumin Publishing, 2022)
- 『Opera 《Jesus Christ》 for Ballet, Voice & String Quartet』 (Sumin Publishing, 2023)

=== Piano albums ===
- 『Quiet Time Bible 1』 (2011)
- 『Quiet Time Bible 2』 (2011)
- 『Quiet Time Bible 3』 (2011)
- 『Quiet Time Bible 4 [Healing]』 (2012)
- 『Quiet Time Bible 5 [Piano Romans]』(2013)
- 『Quiet Time Bible 6 [Genesis 1]』 (2014)

=== Electric guitar albums ===
- 『Grace and Worship Hymns Vol. 1』 (2022)
- 『You Are My Everything Hymns Vol. 2』 (2023)

=== Fantaga albums ===
- 『Fantaga on the theme of Jeongseon Arirang』 (Feat. Baritone Gi-hong Jeon, piano Yoo Ji-hye)

=== Co-authored ===
- 『Creative Song Collection Based on Korean Folk Songs』 (2021)
- 『Collection of Original Songs Based on Korean Folk Songs』 (2022)

=== Theses ===
- 『Composition Techniques of Korean Music Composers』 (2022)
- 『Jump into the sea with fire!』 (Music Criticism Vol. 22)

Other compositions

<Two Fantaga on the theme of Korean folk songs>, <Piano Quartet for those getting married>, <Six four-voice hymns without words>, string quartet <Seeing the Private Meeting with Christ>, <3 Violin Rhapsody>

== Authority control ==
Authority control
VIAF	USA	UK	Germany	Sweden	Italy	Australia
