= Poamsan =

Mountain in South Korea

Highest point
- Elevation: 961.7 m (3,155 ft)

Geography
- Location: South Korea

Korean name
- Hangul: 포암산
- Hanja: 布岩山
- RR: Poamsan
- MR: P'oamsan

Poamsan (Korean: 포암산) is one of the Sobaek Mountains of central South Korea. It rises to 961.7 m (3,155 ft) above sea level, and stands on the border of Mungyeong, North Gyeongsang Province and Chungju, North Chungcheong Province. To the southwest of its principal peak, Poam mountain descends to the low pass of Haneuljae.

Much of Poam Mountain is now contained in Woraksan National Park. Its lower slopes contain a number of important cultural artifacts, many of which are linked to the role of Haneuljae as a key transit route in the Silla and Goryeo periods. For example, the site of the Goryeo-era Buddhist temple of Mireuksa is located in Mireung-ni, Chungju. The site of the Silla-era Buddhist temple of in Gwaneum-ni, Mungyeong-eup, Mungyeong. Stone pagodas and sculptures from these long-abandoned temples, which appear to have played a double role as temples and traveller's hostels, can still be found at the sites.

== See also ==
- List of mountains in Korea
- Geography of South Korea
