= Great Yeongnam Road =

One of The Principal Roads of Joseon

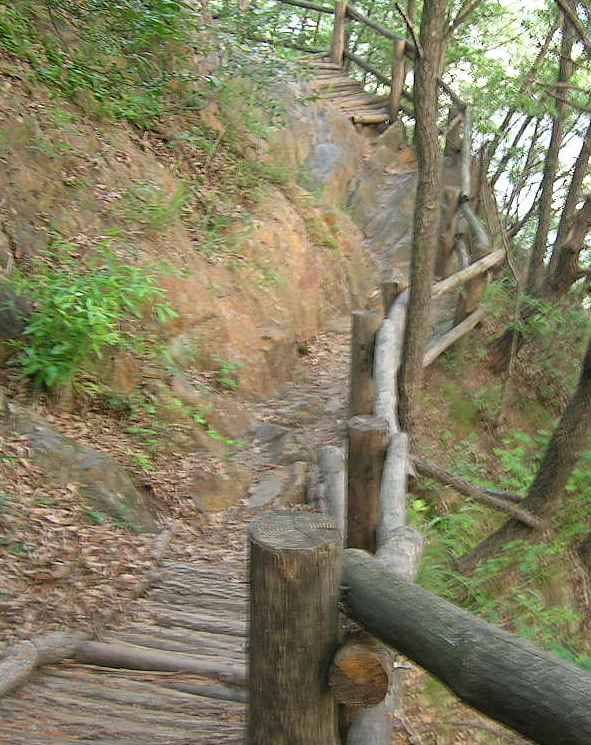
- Great Yeongnam Road near Rabbit Cliff, Mungyeong.

Korean name
- Hangul: 영남대로
- Hanja: 嶺南大路
- RR: Yeongnam daero
- MR: Yŏngnam taero

The Great Yeongnam Road (Korean: 영남대로), was one of the principal roads of Korea during the Joseon period (1392–1910). It ran between Hanseong (modern-day Seoul) and Dongnae (in modern-day Busan). More generally, it served to connect the Gyeongsang Province to the capital.

It takes its name from Yeongnam, an alternate name for the Gyeongsang region. In addition to officials and merchants, the road was used by scholars from Gyeongsang on their way to and from the gwageo: the national civil service examinations held in the capital.

Much of the course of the road was destroyed in the course of the 20th century. However, a few small stretches have been preserved. The most notable of these is Mungyeong Saejae, where the road crossed the Sobaek Mountains.

== See also ==
- History of Korea
