= Mungyeong =

City in North Gyeongsang, South Korea

Coordinates: 36°35′38″N 128°12′05″E

- Municipal City
- Panoramic view of Mungyeong

- Flag Emblem of Mungyeong

- Location in South Korea
- Country: South Korea
- Region: Yeongnam
- Administrative divisions: 2 eup, 7 myeon, 5 dong

Government
  - mayor: Shin Hyun-kook (신현국)

Area
  - Total: 911.73 km^{2} (352.02 sq mi)

Population (September 2024)
  - Total: 67,544
  - Density: 84.79/km^{2} (219.6/sq mi)
  - Dialect: Gyeongsang
- Time zone: UTC+9 (Korea Standard Time)
- Area code: +82-54

Korean name
- Hangul: 문경시
- Hanja: 聞慶市
- RR: Mungyeong-si
- MR: Mun'gyŏng-si

Mungyeong (Korean: 문경; Korean pronunciation: [mun.ɡjʌŋ]) is a city in North Gyeongsang Province, South Korea. The local government, economy, and transportation networks are all centered in Jeomchon, the principal town. Mungyeong has a lengthy history, and is known today for its various historic and scenic tourist attractions. The city's name means roughly "hearing good news." Recently, development has been somewhat stagnant with the decline of the coal industry. Since the 1990s, the proportion of people who rely on the tourism industry through Mungyeong Saejae has gradually increased.

The city of Mungyeong was created after Jeomchon City and rural Mungyeong County were combined in 1995. It is now an urban-rural complex similar to 53 other small and medium-sized cities with a population under 300,000 people in South Korea.

== History ==
The Mungyeong area is believed to have been controlled by a mixture of Jinhan and Byeonhan states during the Samhan period in the first centuries of the Common Era. The Jinhan state of Geungi-guk may have been located near Sanyang-myeon. Byeonhan states such as Sabeol-guk and Gosunsi-guk, which probably controlled the Hamchang area of Sangju, may also have extended their control over adjacent areas that are now part of Mungyeong. However, this stage of local history is almost entirely hypothetical, since very little evidence of any kind remains.

At any rate, the rising power of Silla controlled the area by 505. Capitalizing on the territory's strategic potential, Silla set up various mountain fortresses in the area to control movement in and out of western Korea. Control of transit through the area would have gained even greater importance after Silla's 553 seizure of the Han River valley on the western side of the mountains. At this time the low Haneuljae pass near Poam Mountain was probably the favored crossing, in contrast to the higher Mungyeong Saejae pass which came into favor in the Joseon period.

As Silla reorganized its administrative structure under King Seongdeok in 757, the Mungyeong area was placed under the province of Sangju, and divided among various hyeon, or local districts. During this Unified Silla period the temple of Gwaneumsa, of which all but a few traces have vanished, was constructed near Haneuljae in present-day Mungyeong-eup.

In the early Goryeo period, in 983, King Seongjong reorganized local government yet again. Most of Mungyeong remained divided into assorted hyeon, under the central jurisdiction of Sangju. In 1390, Mungyeong-gun (Mungyeong County) begins to appear in the records, although not with its current boundaries.

In the Joseon period, the Eight Provinces were laid out and thus Mungyeong became part of Gyeongsang Province, which it remains. During later Joseon times, the road from Seoul to Busan was established running over Mungyeong Saejae. Beginning in the 18th century, gates were erected on the road to control traffic and protect travelers from brigandage. These gates are still preserved today.

The first railroads were constructed in the area during the period of Japanese occupation. Jeomchon Station was opened on December 25, 1924. However, the pace of resource extraction did not accelerate greatly until the post-war period, under the first South Korean government led by Syngman Rhee. Construction on the Gaeun Line, with the goal of improving access to the coal deposits around Gaeun, began on January 18, 1953, before the official end of the Korean War (the line was completed in 1955).

Local self-governance was established in the early years of the Republic of Korea, but abruptly cancelled following the military coup of 1961. After the end of military dictatorship, local representative government was reinstituted in 1991. At that time, the present-day territory of Mungyeong was divided between Jeomchon City and Mungyeong County. The city acquired its present-day borders on January 1, 1995, when the two former units were merged to form Mungyeong City.

== Geography and climate ==
=== Geography ===
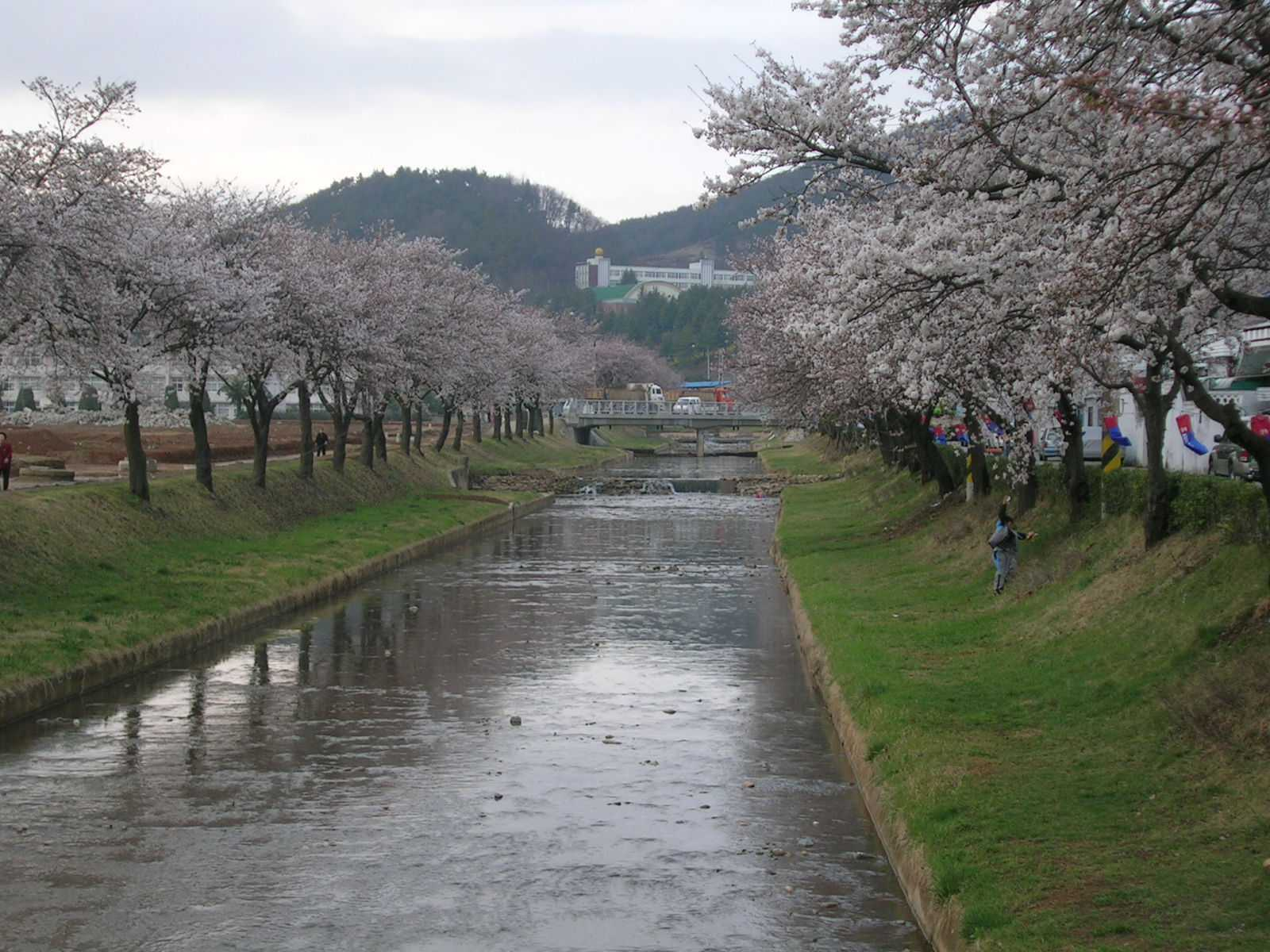
Mojeoncheon

Mungyeong extends a total of 40 km (25 mi) from west to east, and 37 from north to south. Its shape very roughly approximates a right triangle, with the hypotenuse corresponding to the peaks of the Sobaek Mountains. The northern tip is in Dongno-myeon, at 36°52'10'' N latitude. The southern extremity lies in Nongam-myeon, at 36°41'40'' N. The easternmost edge of the city can also be found in Dongno-myeon, at 128°22'42'' E longitude. On the west, Mungyeong comes to an end in Gaeun-eup, at 127°52'48'' E.

Mungyeong stands on the border between North Gyeongsang and North Chungcheong Provinces. On its northern and western borders, it adjoins the North Chungcheong districts of Danyang County, Jecheon, and Chungju on the north and Goesan County on the northwest. Within North Gyeongsang province, Mungyeong adjoins Yecheon County to the east and Sangju to the south.

The topography of Mungyeong is dominated by the Sobaek mountains, which form the line between North Gyeongsang and North Chungcheong provinces. The city's highest point lies on this line, at 1161-meter Munsu peak of Worak Mountain in Dongno-myeon. The city's terrain, cut by numerous valleys, slopes down from the Sobaek peaks toward the valleys of the Nakdong River and its tributary, the Yeong. At their meeting-point in Yeongsun-myeon, the rivers are barely 200 m above sea level. Above the valleys, the soil is thin and outcroppings of igneous or sedimentary bedrock are common. Millions of years of erosion have created spectacular cliffs and escarpments in many areas, some of which have become major attractions for local tourism.

=== Climate ===
Located in the shadow of the Sobaek mountains and west of the Taebaek Mountains, Mungyeong has a humid continental climate (Köppen: Dwa), but can be considered a borderline humid subtropical climate (Köppen: Cwa) using the −3 °C (27 °F) isotherm. The number of frost-free days is significantly lower than it is in more coastal areas of South Korea. Annual temperature fluctuates around 11 °C (52 °F), and annual rainfall around 1,300 mm (51.2 in). There are roughly 90 days of heavy rain per year, of which about 30 fall during the monsoonal rainy season in July and August.

Climate data for Mungyeong (1991–2020 normals, extremes 1973–present)
Month	Jan	Feb	Mar	Apr	May	Jun	Jul	Aug	Sep	Oct	Nov	Dec	Year
Record high °C (°F)	13.8 (56.8)	22.4 (72.3)	26.2 (79.2)	32.3 (90.1)	35.2 (95.4)	35.6 (96.1)	37.8 (100.0)	38.1 (100.6)	34.4 (93.9)	30.1 (86.2)	27.1 (80.8)	16.9 (62.4)	38.1 (100.6)
Mean daily maximum °C (°F)	3.4 (38.1)	6.3 (43.3)	12.1 (53.8)	18.9 (66.0)	24.0 (75.2)	27.2 (81.0)	28.8 (83.8)	29.4 (84.9)	25.3 (77.5)	20.0 (68.0)	12.4 (54.3)	5.4 (41.7)	17.8 (64.0)
Daily mean °C (°F)	−1.7 (28.9)	0.6 (33.1)	5.8 (42.4)	12.2 (54.0)	17.3 (63.1)	21.3 (70.3)	23.9 (75.0)	24.2 (75.6)	19.2 (66.6)	13.0 (55.4)	6.4 (43.5)	0.1 (32.2)	11.9 (53.4)
Mean daily minimum °C (°F)	−6.3 (20.7)	−4.7 (23.5)	−0.1 (31.8)	5.4 (41.7)	10.6 (51.1)	15.9 (60.6)	20.2 (68.4)	20.3 (68.5)	14.5 (58.1)	7.3 (45.1)	1.1 (34.0)	−4.7 (23.5)	6.6 (43.9)
Record low °C (°F)	−20.0 (−4.0)	−17.0 (1.4)	−11.0 (12.2)	−4.2 (24.4)	1.7 (35.1)	4.6 (40.3)	10.7 (51.3)	10.4 (50.7)	3.9 (39.0)	−4.0 (24.8)	−9.8 (14.4)	−16.7 (1.9)	−20.0 (−4.0)
Average precipitation mm (inches)	18.9 (0.74)	29.7 (1.17)	48.7 (1.92)	89.5 (3.52)	108.1 (4.26)	154.8 (6.09)	309.5 (12.19)	274.7 (10.81)	138.4 (5.45)	58.8 (2.31)	40.9 (1.61)	22.9 (0.90)	1,294.9 (50.98)
Average precipitation days (≥ 0.1 mm)	5.5	5.6	7.5	8.5	8.3	9.1	15.7	14.3	9.3	5.9	7.0	6.1	102.8
Average snowy days	6.7	5.1	2.8	0.3	0.0	0.0	0.0	0.0	0.0	0.1	1.4	4.5	20.7
Average relative humidity (%)	56.0	53.6	54.0	52.6	60.2	69.2	80.1	79.7	76.9	70.1	63.9	58.5	64.6
Mean monthly sunshine hours	167.6	183.6	200.4	220.3	241.7	198.6	148.9	163.0	171.2	201.1	163.4	161.2	2,221
Percentage possible sunshine	58.5	60.4	56.7	59.8	57.5	49.6	37.3	44.8	50.2	61.5	55.5	55.5	53.3
Source: Korea Meteorological Administration (snow and percent sunshine 1981–2010)

== Government ==
The seat of government is located in Jeomchon 4-dong. Local government is ruled by representative democracy in a parliamentary system. However, many aspects of local governance are actually under centralized provincial or national control. For example, educational affairs are overseen by the Mungyeong Office of Education, which reports not to the city government but to the North Gyeongsang provincial Office of Education. A similar situation applies to the local police.

=== Executive ===
The mayors of Mungyeong have been elected by popular vote since 1995. Under current South Korean law, elections are held every four years. The current mayor of Mungyeong is Shin Hyun-Kook (신현국), who prevailing in the local elections of July 1, 2022. The vice mayor is Baek Seungmo (백승모), who began serving on January 1, 2023.

=== Legislative ===
The head of the Mungyeong city council is Lee Jeonggeol (이정걸), who was elected from Ra constituency (Hogye, Jeomchon 1 and 3 dong). There are a total of thirteen members altogether.

=== Judicial ===
The city court of Mungyeong is located near the city hall. Along with the Yecheon city court, it is one of two courts overseen by the Sangju circuit, which in turn reports to the Daegu District Court in the provincial capital.

== Administrative districts ==
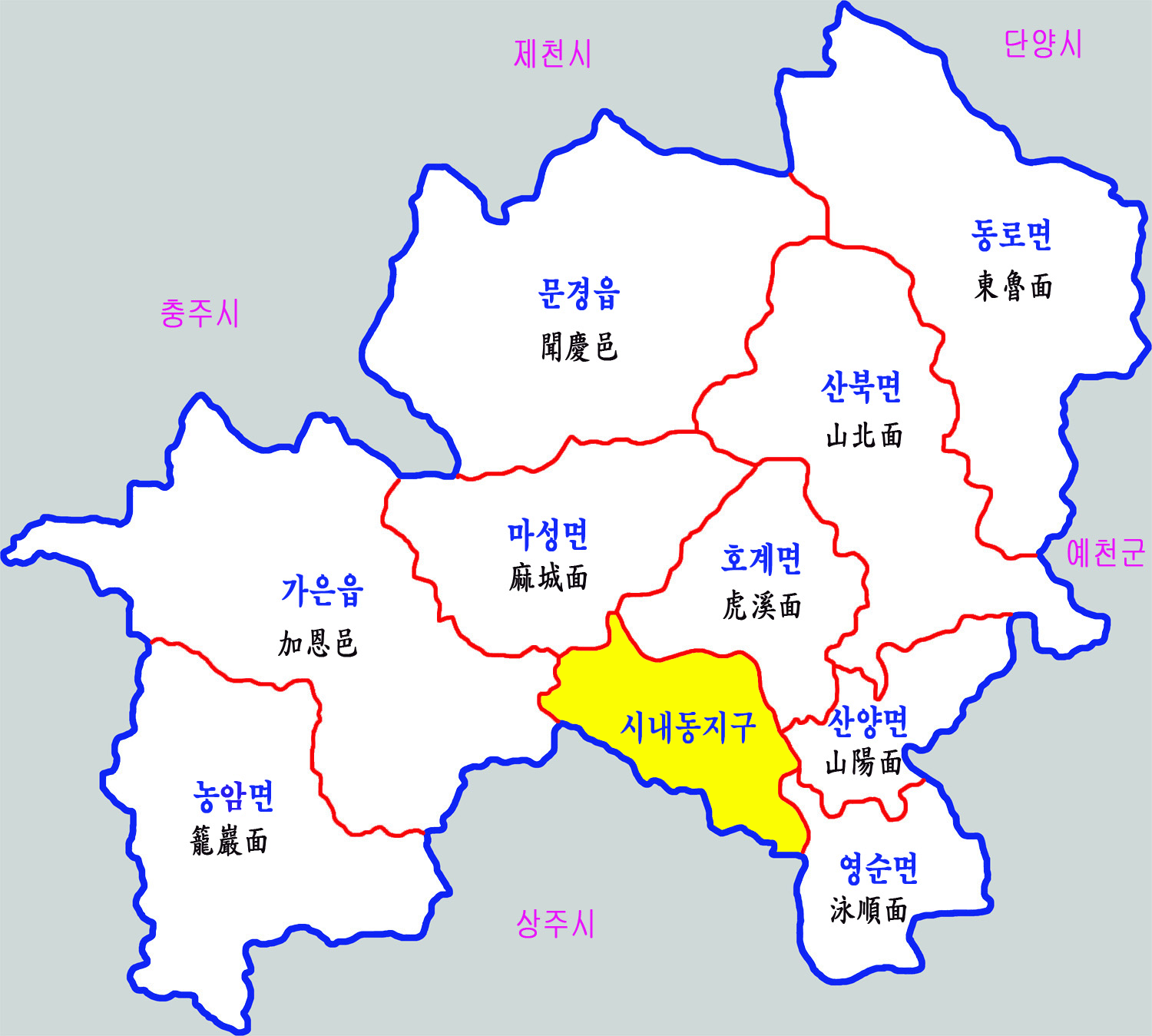
Map of Mungyeong in Korean

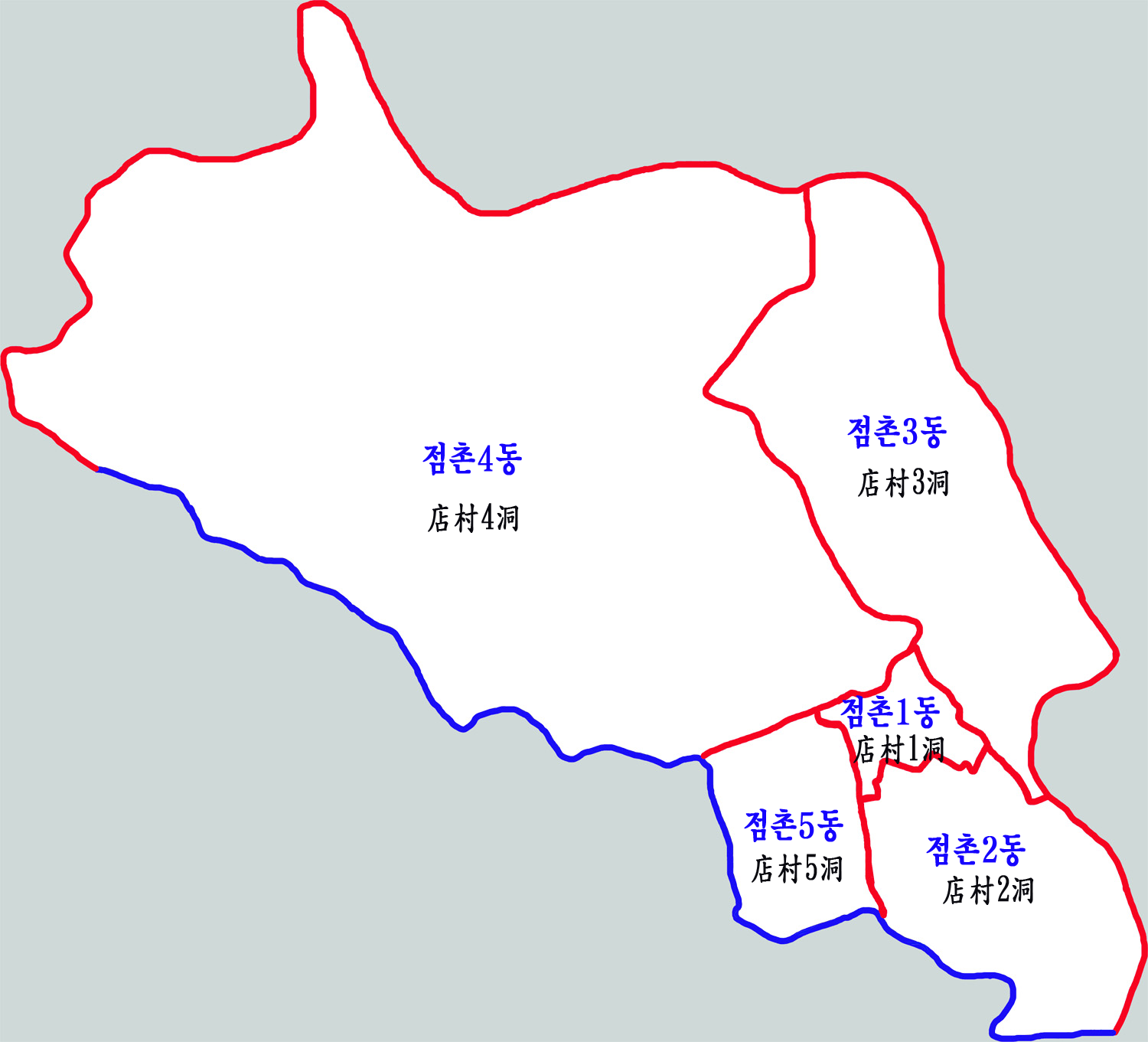
Inset map

It consists of 2 eup, 7 myeon and 5 dong.

Name	Hangeul	Hanja
Mungyeong-eup	문경읍	聞慶邑
Gaeun-eup	가은읍	加恩邑
Yeongsun-myeon	영순면	永順面
Sanyang-myeon	산양면	山陽面
Hogye-myeon	호계면	虎溪面
Sanbuk-myeon	산북면	山北面
Dongno-myeon	동로면	東魯面
Maseong-myeon	마성면	麻城面
Nongam-myeon	농암면	籠岩面
Jeomchon 1(il)-dong	점촌1동	店村1洞
Jeomchon 2(i)-dong	점촌2동	店村2洞
Jeomchon 3(sam)-dong	점촌3동	店村3洞
Jeomchon 4(sa)-dong	점촌4동	店村4洞
Jeomchon 5(o)-dong	점촌5동	店村5洞

- Number of Eup, Myeon, and Dong: 14 (2 Eup, 7 Myeon, 5 Dong)
- Administrative governance: 319 (103 tong, 216 ri)
- Legal governance: 130 (119 ri, 11 dong)
- Square area: 911.73 km^{2} Daeyasan Mountain Natural Recreation Forest
- Number of Ban (neighborhood associations): 1,560
- Number of natural settlements: 523 settlements
- Mungyeong City rural/urban municipality established: 1995. 01. 01

== Demographics ==
The population of Mungyeong continues to fall, as more people move away to major urban centers such as Daegu and Seoul. Although the city overall is losing population, there continues to be a considerable expansion in construction in the urban center of Jeomchon.

year	total population
1975	161,095
1980	147,242
1985	139,731
1990	119,416
1995	92,239
2000	90,846
2005	70,926
2010	69,021
2013	75,664
2017	73,294

The overwhelming majority of Mungyeong's people (approximately 99.7%) are ethnic Korean. Many of them are from families with long and deep roots in the area.

== Economy ==
The Mungyeong economy during much of the 20th century was based on coal mining. However, these mines were closed in the 1980s, and since then the municipal government has focused on developing tourism, agriculture and light industry in the region.

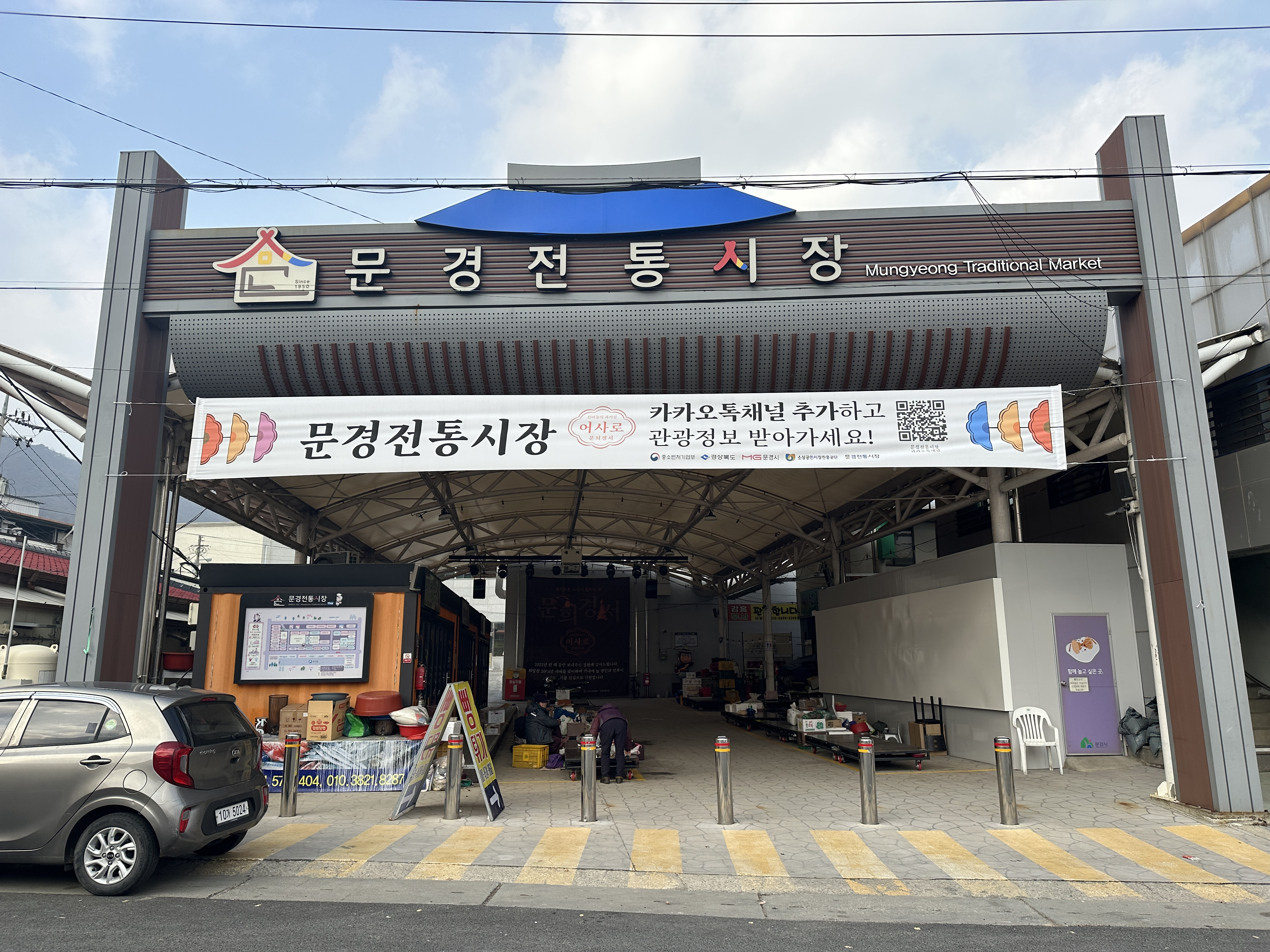
Mungyeong Traditional Market (2023)

Because of its mountainous condition, most of Mungyeong's land (roughly 75%) is unsuitable for farming. Nonetheless, the agricultural sector continues to play an important role in the local economy as well. Some local produce is sold directly in the area, but most is exported to major urban centers on South Korea. Orchard farming, particularly apple growing plays an important role, with 4.4 km^{2} (1.7 sq mi) of land devoted to orcharding.

The local government has set up various institutions to promote agricultural and industrial development, including "agro-industrial complexes" located around the rural districts. These efforts have met with some success, as for example the area under orchard cultivation expanded significantly in the late 1990s.

== Communications and media ==
In terms of media it may be considered largely identical with the rest of northern North Gyeongsang. Broadcast is dominated by network outlets in Daegu or Andong, and most available newspapers are printed in Seoul, although provincial newspapers also circulate.

Local journalism, therefore, is primarily limited to local weekly newspapers such as the Saejae Sinmun. These weeklies are dominated by classified advertising, but also carry a selection of local news and commentary.

In recent years, cable television and high-speed internet service has become widespread in Mungyeong.

== Divisions ==
Mungyeong is divided into 2 eup, 7 myeon and 5 dongs. These are the primary divisions of the city; each is divided in turn into a large number of ri. (For more information on these terms, see Administrative divisions of South Korea). The dongs are all clustered around the town of Jeomchon. The smallest is Jeomchon 1-dong, which covers only 0.98 square kilometers and covers the traditional city center of Jeomchon. The largest is Jeomchon 4-dong northwest of town, which at 29.62 km^{2} (11.44 sq mi) is bigger than all the others put together. Prior to January 1, 2004, the dongs were known by individual names; for example, Jeomchon 5-dong was known as "Mojeon-dong."

Six of the myeon, or townships, form an L, with its bottom in the southeast near the confluence of the Yeong and Nakdong rivers: Yeongsun-myeon, Sanyang-myeon, Maseong-myeon, Hogye-myeon, Sanbuk-myeon and Dongno-myeon. Nongam-myeon lies south of Gaeun, at Mungyeong's southern limit.

Gaeun-eup was once an important town in its own right, but has now become largely marginalized. Mungyeong-eup, the principal center of the city apart from Jeomchon, is found in the northern area of the county. It was the seat of Mungyeong County before that entity was merged with Jeomchon City to form the modern boundaries of Mungyeong. It still retains a relatively high profile in the county, with its own library and intercity bus terminal.

== People ==
In the late 9th century, when Mungyeong was a part of the Sangju district of Silla, a man from Gaeun-eup (then Gaseon-hyeon) named Ajagae fomented a local peasant rebellion which seized the fortress of Sangju. His son, Kyŏn Hwŏn, who was also probably born in Gaeun, ruled the kingdom of Later Baekje during the Later Three Kingdoms period.

Various literary figures of the Joseon period hailed from Mungyeong, as did heroes of the resistance against Japanese attacks in the late 16th century (the local commander Sin Gil-won, 1548–1592) and of the righteous army movement in the early 20th (the leader I Gang-nyeon, 1858–1908).

== Tourism ==
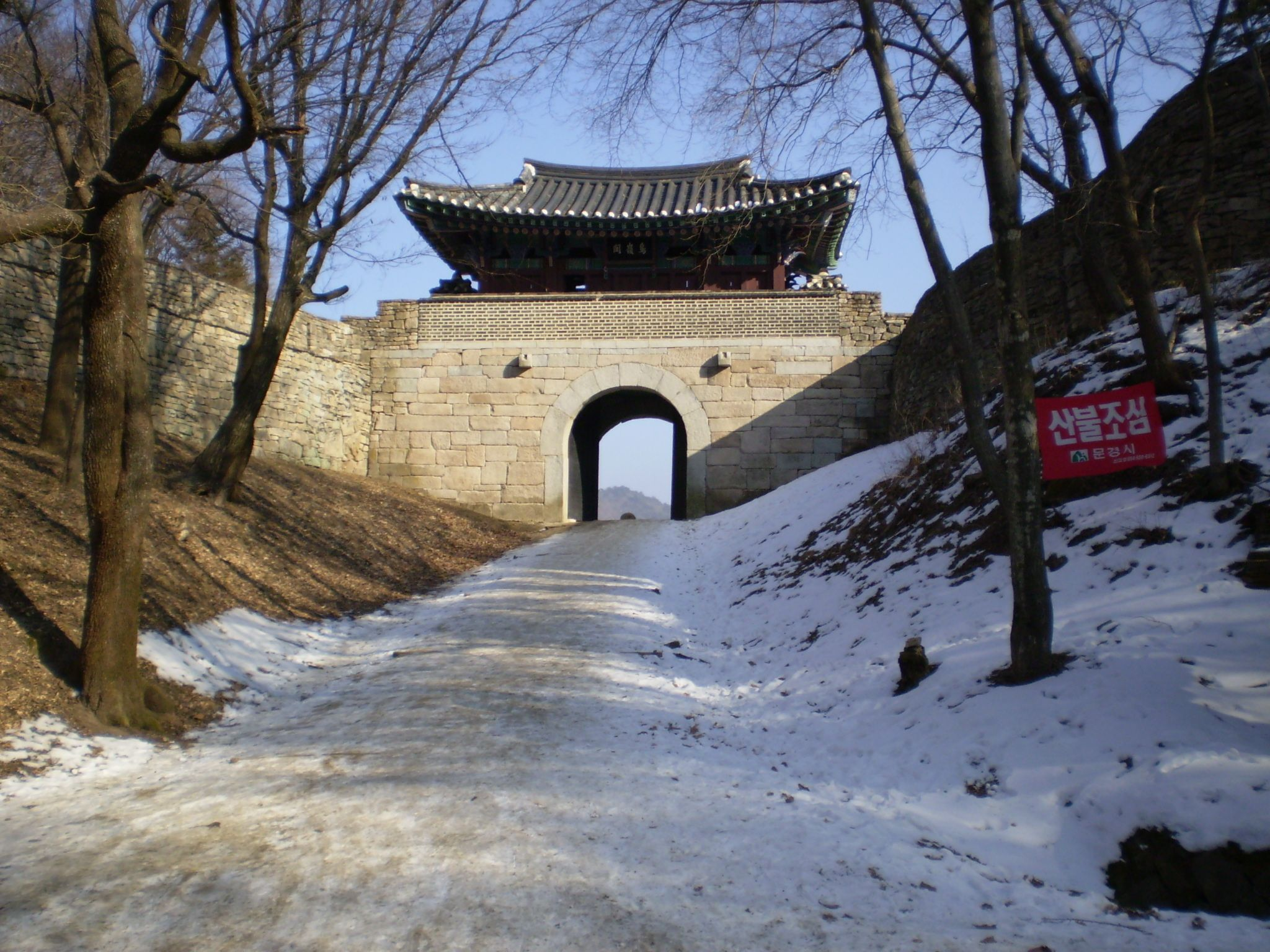
Mungyeong Saejae.

Numerous tourist attractions have been promoted throughout the city of Mungyeong. By far the best-known of these around the country is Mungyeong Saejae, the mountain pass where the old road from Busan to Seoul passed over the Sobaek mountains and out of the Gyeongsang region. The three gates which controlled traffic on that road are now maintained as tourist attractions.

Various other places around Mungyeong are renowned for their scenery. Among these is the Jinnam Bridge area, which a regional newspaper called the Yeongnam Ilbo once called "one of the eight wonders of Gyeongsangbuk-do." There are three museums in Mungyeong: the historical museum at Mungyeong Saejae, a ceramics museum nearby, and the Coal Museum in Gaeun-eup. Additional local tourist attractions include spas, a shooting range, a paragliding area, and the Gyeongcheon Lake reservoir in the east.

Parkland takes up a significant portion of Mungyeong's total area. The Songnisan National Park covers part of Gaeun-eup in the southwest. Mungyeong Saejae is itself a provincial park, covering a substantial area of Mungyeong-eup. Also covering part of Mungyeong-eup and a considerable chunk of Dongno-myeon is Woraksan National Park.

The municipal government has striven to convert the coal-mining tradition into a tourist attraction as much as possible. For example, a Coal Museum has been set up in Gaeun, which was once the heart of the mining district. Likewise, the former Gaeun Line railroad has been converted into a bicycle path.

In April 2020 a 1.8 kilometres (1.1 mi) cable-driven people mover - called the "Mungyeong Dansan Tourist Monorail" - opened to take people to the peak of Mount Dan (959 meters above sea level) near Mungyeongsaejae Pass. Ten 8-passenger vehicles take visitors to the summit, with a round trip time of 35 minutes. (Although the system is called a 'monorail' it runs on two rails). The summit has a number of attractions including camping sites and mountain bike trails.

== Festival ==
2015 Mungyeong Military World Games (세계 군인 체육 대회; 世界軍人體育大會)

In October 2015, competitions were held in various parts of North Gyeongsang Province. It was held in Mungyeong, and the match was held in Mungyeong at the stadium of the Korean Armed Forces Athletic Corps.

== Transportation ==
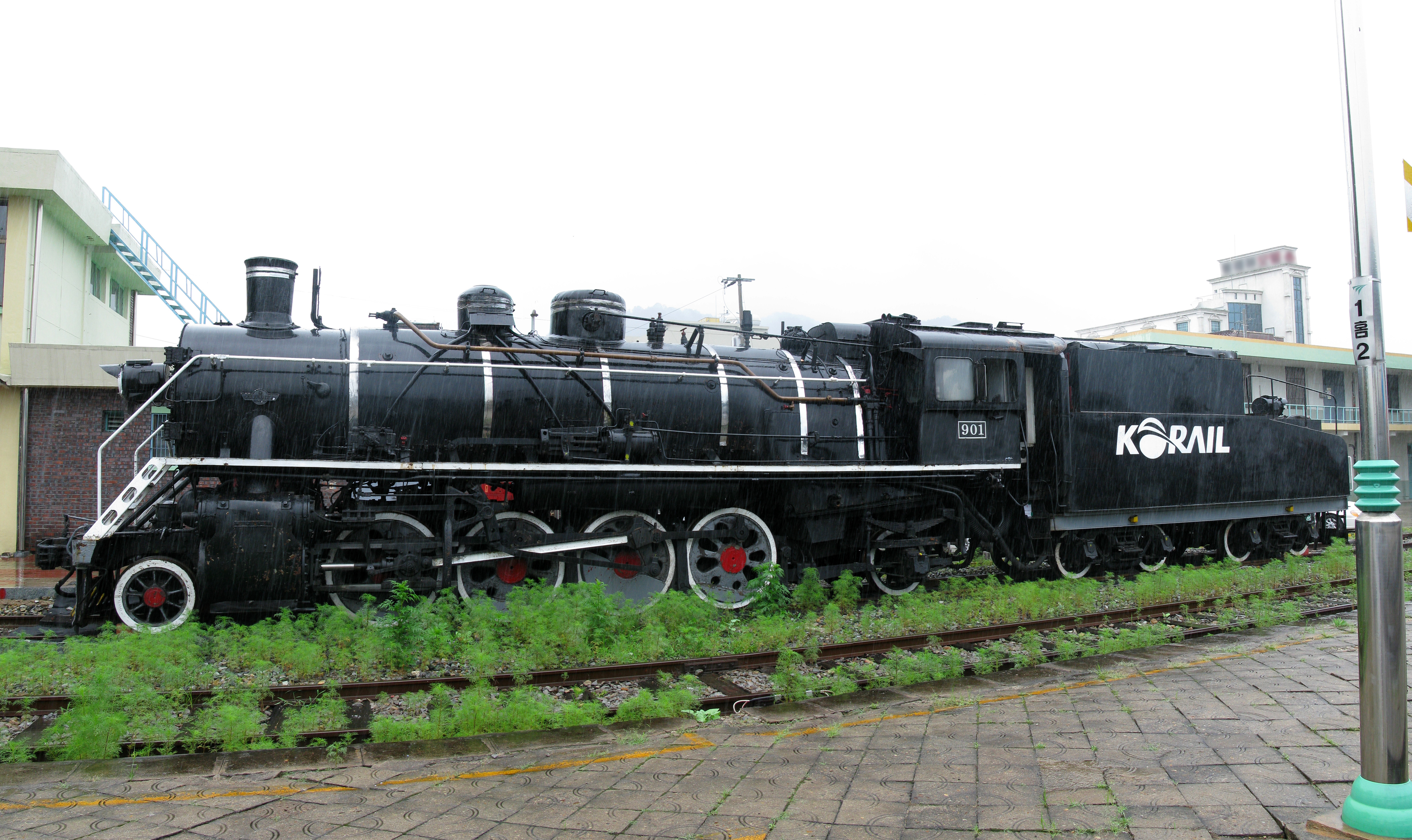
Korail SL901

The automobile is the preferred means of transportation for most Mungyeong residents. Auto ownership is quite high, with a total of 21,687 cars owned, according to local statistics. However, because of the city's low population density, traffic congestion is rare. National highways connect Jeomchon with Sangju, Chungju and Yeongju.

Before the end of 2004, the portion of the Jungbu Naeryuk Expressway running through Mungyeong was completed. Interchanges with the expressway are located at Jeomchon and Mungyeong-eup. This has led to significant changes in local transit patterns and the local economy.

The city's public transit needs are primarily served by buses: city buses which operate locally and to neighboring Sangju and Yecheon, and intercity buses which carry passengers to more distant destinations. Bus terminals are located in Mungyeong-eup and Jeomchon. Because of low passenger traffic, most intercity buses which pass through Mungyeong also stop in Sangju.

Mungyeong is also served by passenger rail, through the Gyeongbuk Line, which runs from Yeongju to Gimcheon (where it joins the Gyeongbu Line, and stops at Jeomchon Station. In the past, the Mungyeong Line and Gaeun Line, spurs which run from Jeomchon Station to Mungyeong-eup and Gaeun-eup, also carried passenger traffic. However, this was discontinued by the Korean National Railroad in 1995, as part of a general restructuring. The Gyeongbuk Line carries three to five passenger trains a day in each direction, in addition to significant freight traffic.

No airports are located within Mungyeong, but a small airport with passenger service operates in neighboring Yecheon.

== Culture ==
The culture of Mungyeong is generally speaking similar to that of other rural areas in Gyeongsang province. It is marked by a relatively strong persistence of Korean Confucian values.

The city retains ties to traditional arts. Various Korean folksongs, including the Mungyeong Saejae arirang, are distinctive to the district. However, the most intensely promoted art form in the district is Mungyeong's traditional ceramic craft, which dates to the Joseon period and is still practiced by many master potters in the area.

The city is also well known for its traditional tea bowl festival since 1999.

Local cuisine, although broadly similar to South Korean cuisine in general, does contain some local flourishes. The North Gyeongsang specialty jjim dalk, a spicy chicken and noodle dish, and Chuncheon-style chicken galbi are widely available.

=== Religion ===
As elsewhere in South Korea, Christianity coexists with Korean Buddhism and shamanism, and a large segment of the population professes no religious belief. Churches can be found in any sizeable community within Mungyeong. The area around Joryeong Mountain contains numerous places of importance for shamanic practitioners, or musogin.

=== Sports ===
Mungyeong is home to the Sangmu Phoenix baseball team and the Mungyeong Sangmu women's football team, and athletics remain highly popular in the city. The city stadium in Jeomchon hosts public athletic competitions, and in addition, numerous private establishments such as batting cages can be found in the area.

In 2015, Mungyeong hosted the 6th International Military Sports Council (CISM) Military World Games.

== Education ==
As elsewhere in South Korea, there is a three-tiered public educational system: 6 years of elementary school, 3 years of middle school, and 3 years of high school. School attendance is compulsory. Within Mungyeong, there are 18 elementary schools, 12 middle schools, and 8 high schools, all overseen by the Mungyeong Office of Education. There is one middle school and one high school exclusively for girls; the others are coeducational. Some high schools, such as Mungyeong Industrial High School and Mungyeong Tourist High School, provide specific vocational training.

Many parents supplement their children's public education with private instruction, and thus there are numerous hagwons, or private academies, both in Jeomchon and outlying areas.

There is only one institution of higher education within Mungyeong, namely Mun Kyung College in Hogye-myeon. Many attend universities nearby, such as Sangju National University, or elsewhere in the country.

Elementary school in Mungyeong

- Hoseonam elementary school
- Jeomchon north elementary school
- Jeomchon elementary school
- Singi elementary school
- Jeomchon jungang elementary school
- Mojeon elementary school
- Yeongsun elementary school
- Sanyang elementary school
- Hogye elementary school
- Sanbook elementary school
- Dongro elementary school
- Mungyeong elementary school
- Yongheung elementary school
- Dangpo elementary school
- Dongseong elementary school
- Gaeun elementary school
- Nongam elementary school

Middle school in Mungyeong

Mungyeong middle school; Mungyeong South middle school; Maseong middle school; Sanbuk middle school; Gaeun middle school	Dongro middle school; Sanyang middle school; Mungyeong Women middle school; Jeomchon middle school

High school in Mungyeong

Jeomchon high school; Gaeun high school; Mungyeong Technical high school; Gyeongbuk Culinary Arts Science High school	Munchang high school; Mungyeong Women high school

== Twin towns – sister cities ==
Mungyeong is twinned with:

- Gwangjin District, Seoul
- Kota Salatiga

== See also ==
- List of cities in South Korea
- Photos and text re: Mungyeong SaeJae Provincial Park, from Wild Korea
- People Power Party (South Korea)
