= Seondalsan =

Mountain in South Korea

Coordinates: 37°02′N 128°43′E

Highest point
- Elevation: 1,236 m (4,055 ft)

Geography
- Location: South Korea
- Parent range: Sobaek Mountains

Korean name
- Hangul: 선달산
- Hanja: 先達山
- RR: Seondalsan
- MR: Sŏndalsan

Seondalsan (Korean: 선달산) is a South Korean mountain that sits between Yeongwol County, Gangwon Province and Bonghwa, North Gyeongsang Province. It has an elevation of 1,236 m (4,055 ft).

== See also ==
- List of mountains in Korea
