= Munkyung College =

College in Mungyeong, South Korea

Coordinates: 36.65771°N 128.17288°E

- 문경대학교
- Type: Private
- Established: 1995
- Undergraduates: 630 (2025)
- Location: Mungyeong, North Gyeongsang South Korea

Korean name
- Hangul: 문경대학교
- Hanja: 聞慶大學校
- RR: Mungyeong daehakgyo
- MR: Mun'gyŏng taehakkyo

Munkyung College, also known as Mun Kyung College, is a private technical college in Mungyeong city, North Gyeongsang province, South Korea. It is located in Hogye-myeon, on the outskirts of Jeomchon. It was established as Mun Kyung Technical College (Korean: 문경전문대학) in 1990, and took on its present English name in 1995. It changed its Korean name to "Mungyeong University" (Korean: 문경대학교) in 2011 by government permission.

As of spring 2025, total enrollment was 630, down from 793 in 2022. The students are taught by 28 faculty. The school has six departments. The largest of these is the four-year nursing program, which as of spring 2025 had an enrollment of 452.

A 2010 evaluation by the Ministry of Education, Science and Technology determined that the school was at risk of shutting down. The school then began to receive a subsidy from the city government of Mungyeong; from 2011 to 2022, the total subsidy amounted to 28.2 billion won. As a result of this subsidy, as of 2025 Munkyung College had the fifth highest level of investment per student out of all private colleges in the country, and the highest in the Daegu and North Gyeongsang region.

== Proposed merger with Soongsil University ==
Following the 2022 local election, incoming Mungyeong mayor Shin Hyun-kook committed to establish a campus of Soongsil University in Mungyeong, and mentioned a possible merger of Munkyung College into Soongsil as one way of achieving that. This was part of a trend toward mergers among South Korean institutions of higher education amid plummeting enrollments nationwide. In November 2022, however, Soongsil representatives stated that they had never heard of any plan to merge with Munkyung. The school's president, former National Assembly member Shin Yeong-guk, also announced his opposition to a merger. The Mungyeong city government then announced that its subsidy for the school would end. In December 2022, Munkyung College and Mungyeong city signed an agreement to work toward a merger with Soongsil.

In February 2024, a memorandum of understanding to cooperate on training tailored to local industry was announced among Munkyung College, Soongsil University, and the governments of North Gyeongsang province and Mungyeong city. In July 2025, mayor Shin stated his goal to obtain government permission for a merger of Soongsil and Munkyung within the coming year.

== See also ==
- Education in South Korea
