= West Nakdong River =

Coordinates: 35°12′00″N 128°54′20″E

West Nakdong

Location
- Country: South Korea
- Cities: Gimhae, Busan

Physical characteristics
- Source: Taebaek Mountains
  - location: Busan, South Korea

Korean name
- Hangul: 서낙동강
- Hanja: 西洛東江
- RR: Seonakdonggang
- MR: Sŏnaktonggang

The West Nakdong River (Korean: 서낙동강) is a river in South Korea.

== Geography ==
The Nakdong is distributary of Nakdong River. Originally being a main branch of the Nakdong River, it later became a distributary.

== Tributary ==
- Joman River
- Pyeonggang River

== See also ==
- Geography of South Korea
- List of rivers of Asia
- Nakdong River
