= Mungyeong Saejae =

Mountain pass in South Korea

Coordinates: 36°46′01″N 128°04′27″E

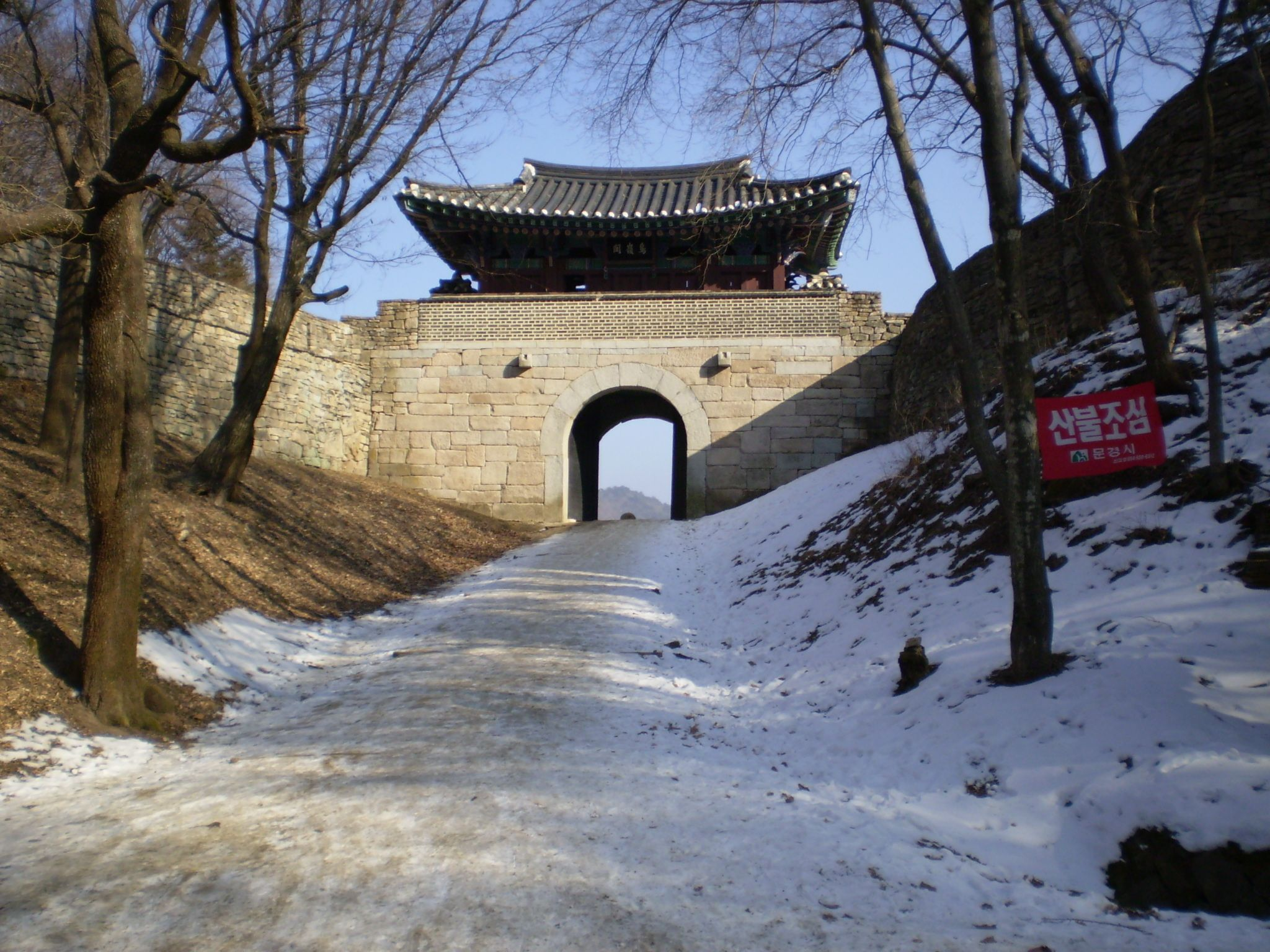
- Gate at the top of Mungyeong Saejae

Korean name
- Hangul: 문경새재
- Hanja: 聞慶새재
- RR: Mungyeong saejae
- MR: Mun'gyŏng saejae

Mungyeong Saejae (Korean: 문경새재) is a mountain pass in central South Korea. It lies on Joryeong Mountain between the main peak (1017 m) and Sinseon Peak (967 m). The pass itself rises to 642 metres (2,106 ft) above sea level. Mungyeong Saejae connects Mungyeong City, North Gyeongsang province with Goesan County in North Chungcheong province. Water flowing down from the Mungyeong side of the pass eventually flows into the Nakdong River and meets the Sea of Japan at Busan. Runoff from the Goesan side eventually flows into the Han River, which passes through Seoul to meet the Yellow Sea at Incheon.

The pass is also known by the name Joryeong (Korean: 조령; Hanja: 鳥嶺). Both names literally mean "bird pass," and probably signify "a pass so high that even birds find the crossing difficult."

The pass is renowned as the only place where the old road between Seoul and Busan, the Great Yeongnam Road, still looks like it did in the Joseon Dynasty. On June 4, 1981, the area around the Mungyeong side of the pass was declared Mungyeong Saejae Provincial Park, which is now a significant tourist attraction. In addition to the pass and the surrounding scenery, the park boasts a museum and tourist hotel, along with a small village of businesses catering to the tourist trade.

During the Joseon period, Mungyeong Saejae played an important role as the gateway in and out of the Gyeongsang province. Scholars, traders and government officials from Gyeongsang had to go through the pass when going to or from Seoul. Three great gates which maintained control over the pass during that time still stand, although the only people who go through them now are tourists.

Mungyeong Saejae is the subject of at least one traditional Korean folksong in the arirang style.

== Images ==
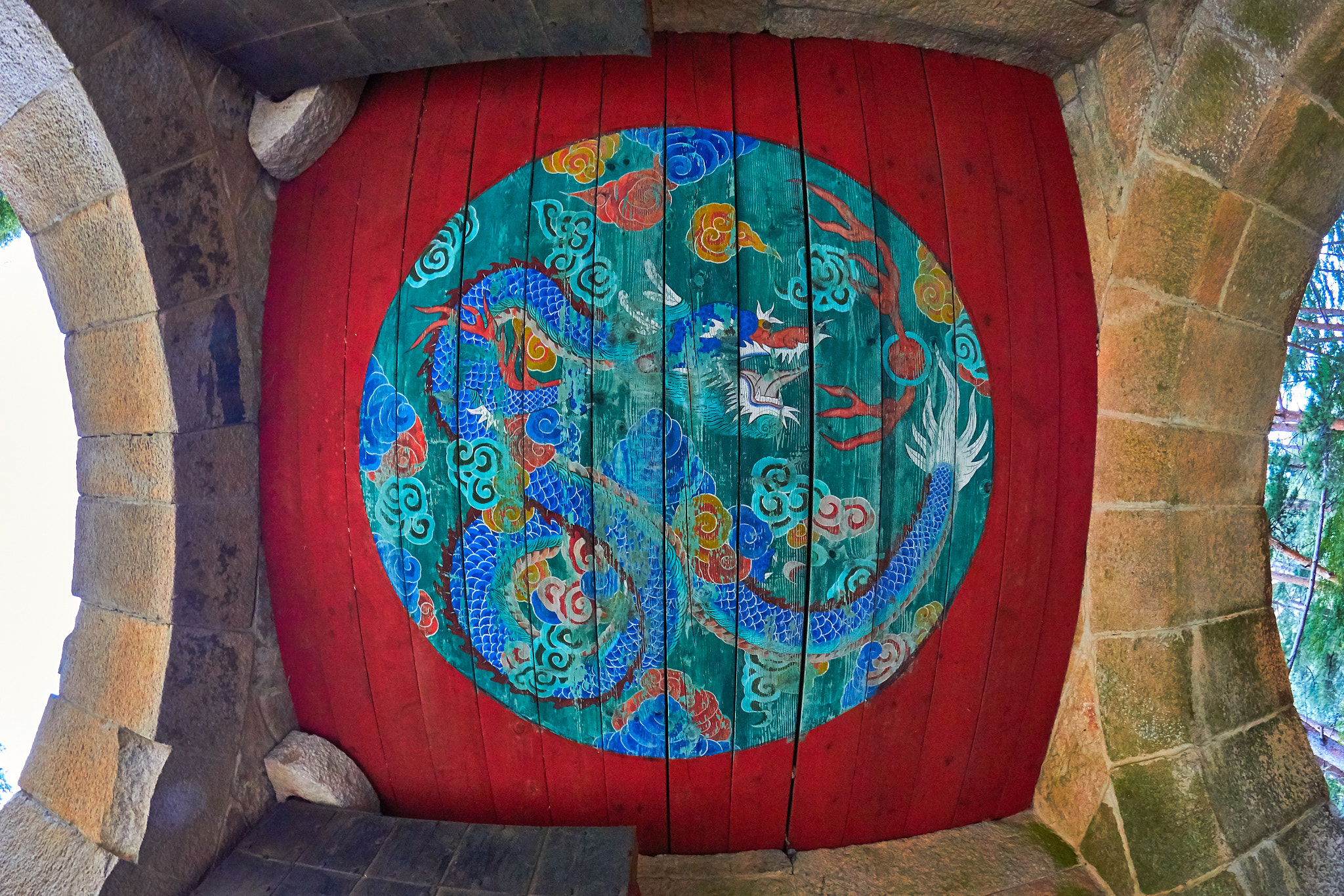
Ceiling of the second gate

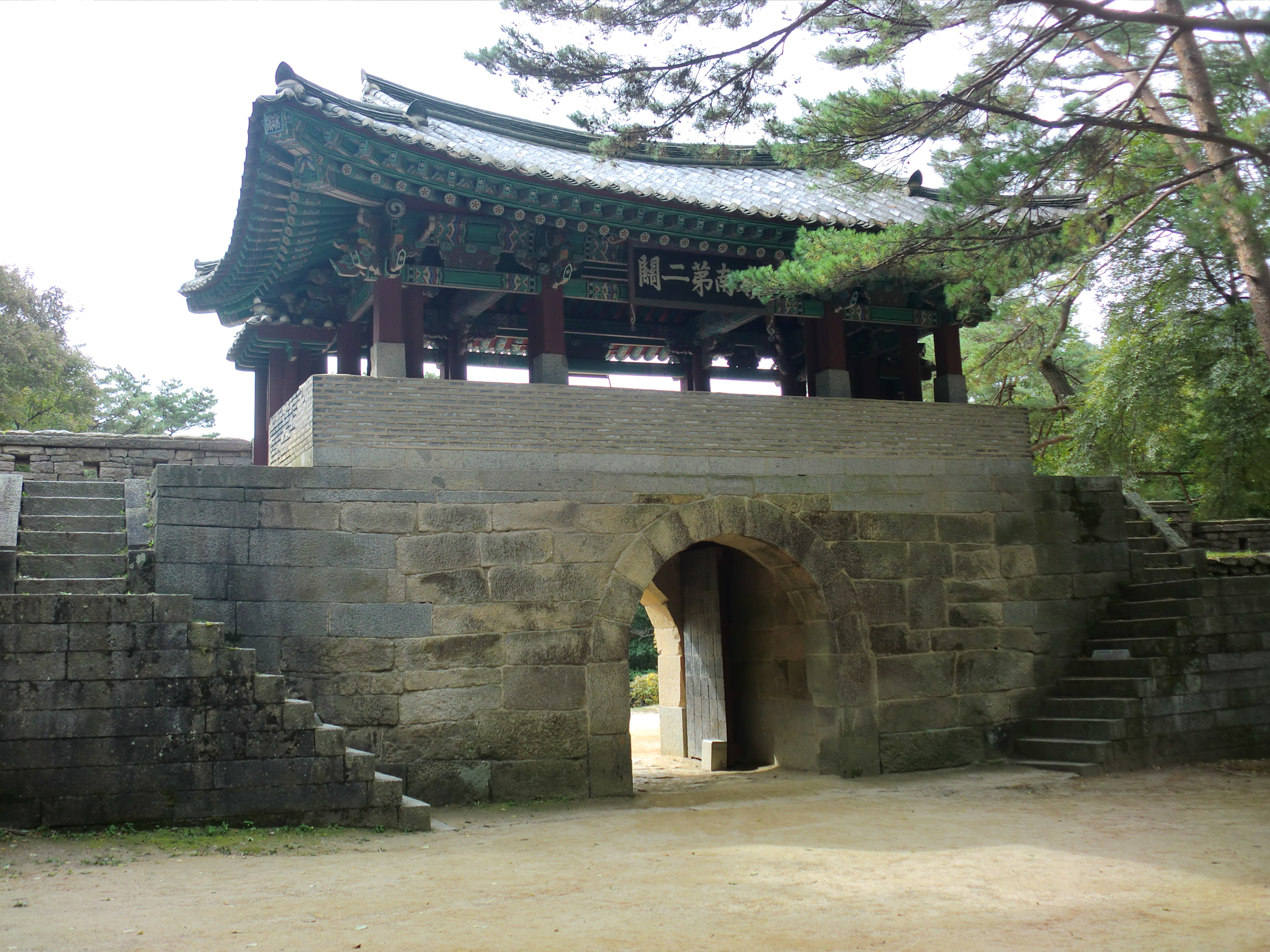
Second gate

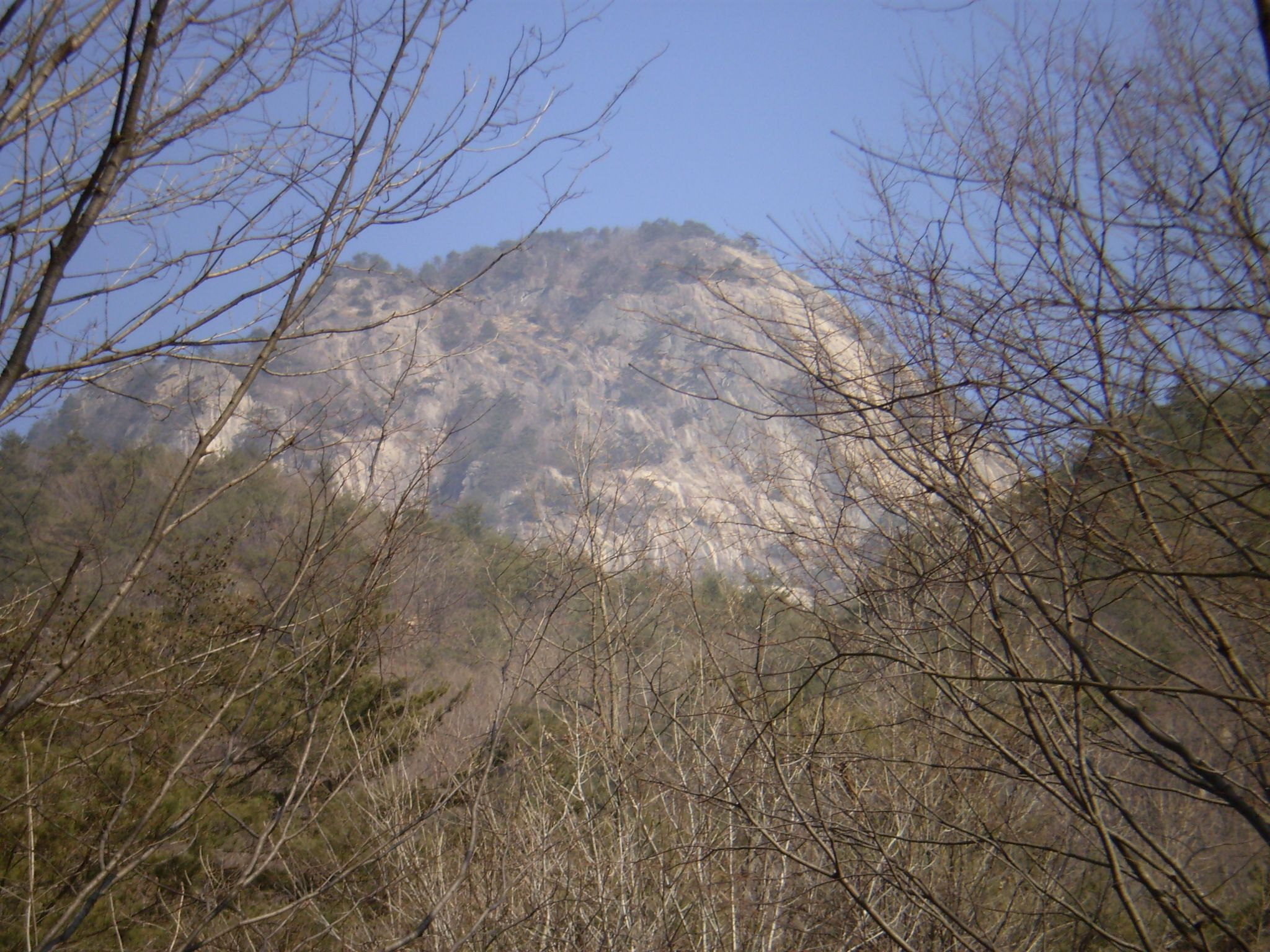
Joryeongsan, from Mungyeong Saejae

== See also ==
- Baekdu-daegan
