= Taebaeksan =

Mountain in South Korea

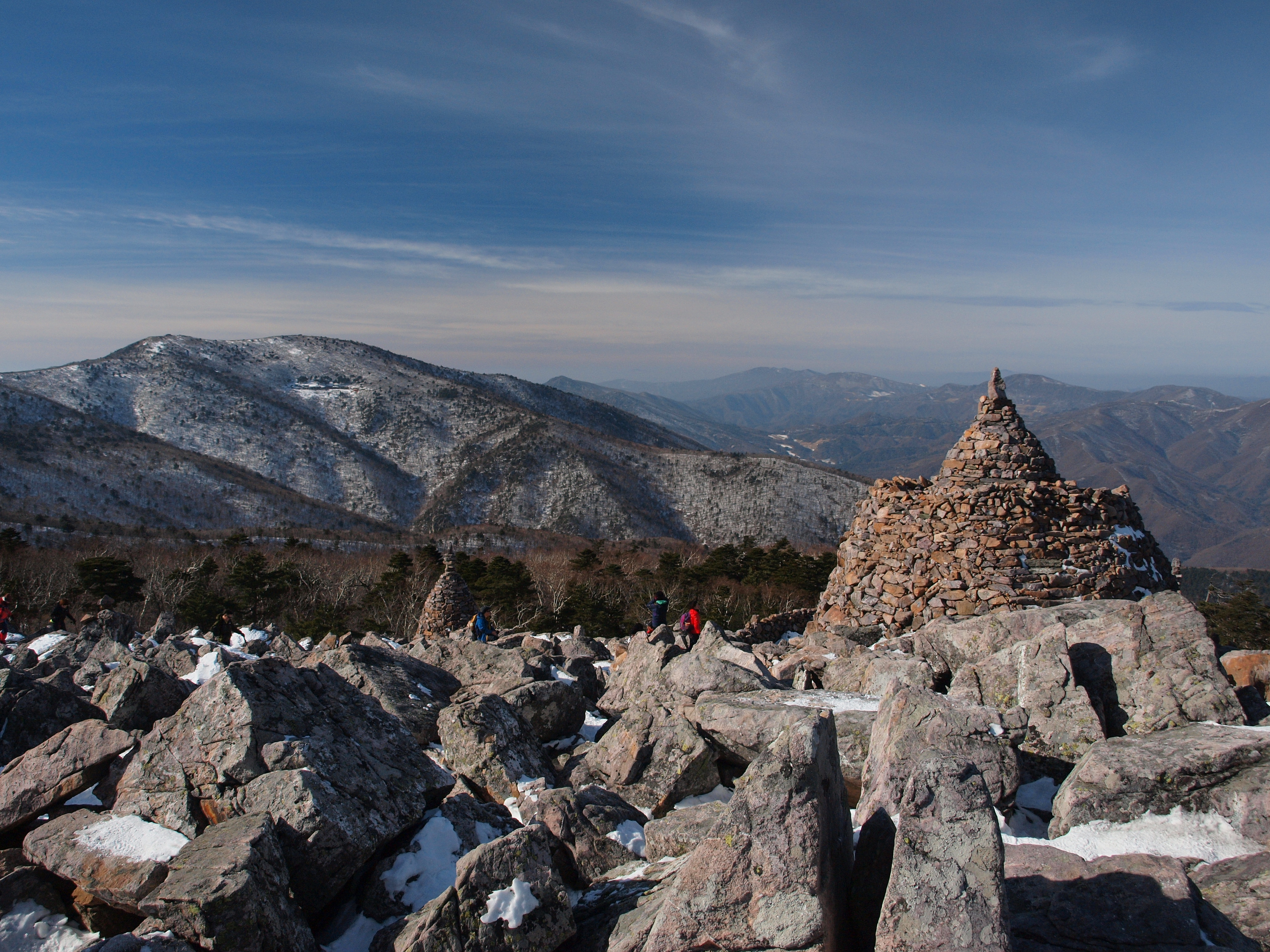
- Main peaks of Taebaeksan as viewed from Munsubong, another of its peaks

Highest point
- Elevation: 1,566.7 m (5,140 ft)
- Coordinates: 37°5′45″N 128°54′55″E

Geography
- Location: South Korea
- Parent range: Taebaek Mountains

Climbing
- Easiest route: Hike

Korean name
- Hangul: 태백산
- Hanja: 太白山
- RR: Taebaeksan
- MR: T'aebaeksan

Taebaeksan, also known as Mount Taebaeksan or Mount Taebaek, is a South Korean mountain with several important peaks of the Taebaek mountain range (in Western-style geography), or the Taebaek Jeongmaek Range (in Korean-style geography). It is an important mountain in the Baekdu-daegan mountain range, the point where it turns west after running along Korea's east coast for a long distance. Its territory stretches from Taebaek in Yeongwol-gun County, Gangwon-do Province to Bonghwa-gun County, Gyeongsangbuk-do Province, and it was designated South Korea's 22nd national park on 22 August 2016. It has an elevation of 1,566.7 m (5,140 ft).

== Attractions ==
Manggyeongsa Temple in Hyeol-dong Taebaek, Yeongwol-gun County, Gangwon-do Province at an elevation of 1,460 meters on Taebaeksan, is a temple built to enshrine the statue of the Bodhisattva of wisdom. It was built by Jajang, a Silla Dynasty monk. The "Dragon Spring" at the entrance of the temple is known as the highest spring in South Korea.

The summit ridge of Taebaeksan is home to a multitude of both azalea bushes and ancient yew trees, making spring (for blossoms) and winter (for rime frost on the twisted trees) particularly good times to visit. The highest peaks are also home to Cheonjedan, a series of ancient Shamanist altars.

The main Danggol entrance plays host to an annual snow festival and a coal mining museum.

== See also ==
- List of mountains in Korea
