= Andong Dam =

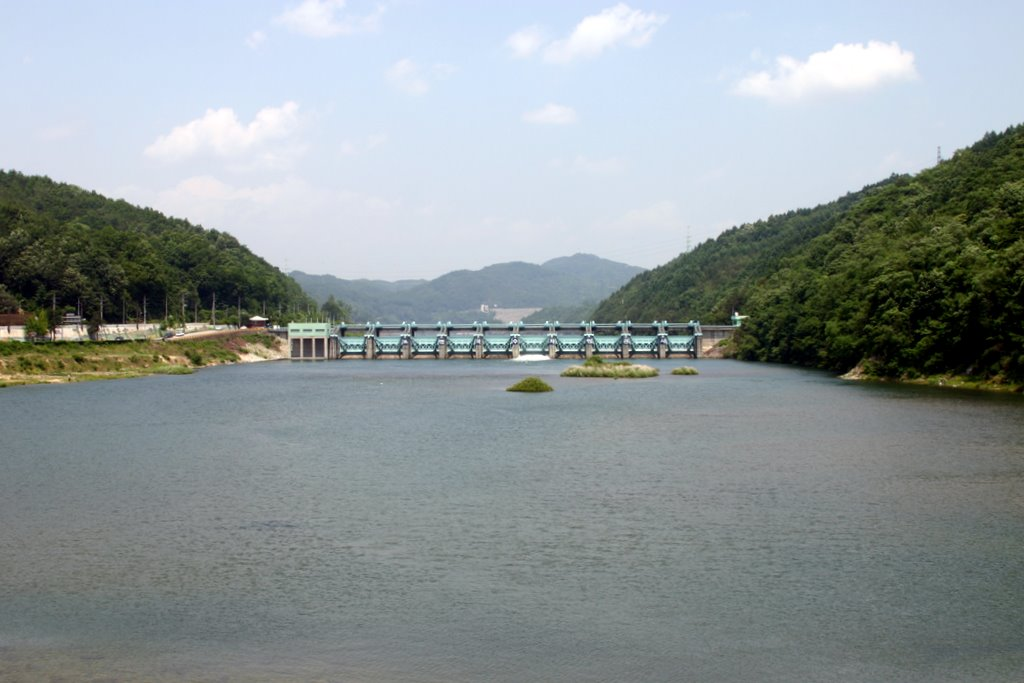
- View from downstream

- Location within South Korea
- Country: South Korea
- Location: Andong
- Coordinates: 36°35′05″N 128°46′26″E
- Status: Operational
- Construction began: 1971
- Opening date: 1976
- Owner: Korea Water Resources Corporation

Dam and spillways
- Type of dam: Embankment, rock-fill
- Impounds: Nakdong River
- Height: 83 m (272 ft)
- Length: 612 m (2,008 ft)
- Width (crest): 8 m (26 ft)
- Width (base): 200 m (656 ft)

Reservoir
- Total capacity: 1,248,000,000 m^{3} (1,011,770 acre⋅ft)
- Active capacity: 1,000,000,000 m^{3} (810,713 acre⋅ft)
- Surface area: 60 km^{2} (23 sq mi)

Power Station
- Commission date: 1976
- Turbines: 2 x 45 MW reversible
- Installed capacity: 90 MW

The Andong Dam is an embankment dam on the Nakdong River, 4 km (2 mi) east of Andong in Gyeongsangbuk-do province, South Korea.

The purpose of the dam is flood control, water supply and hydroelectric power generation. Construction of the dam began in 1971 and was complete in 1976. The 83 m (272 ft) tall rock-fill, central clay core dam withholds a reservoir of 1,248,000,000 m^{3} (1,011,770 acre⋅ft) and provides water to an 90 MW pumped-storage power station. The lower reservoir (afterbay) for the power station is created by a 20 m (66 ft) high and 238 m (781 ft) long weir. The power plant is operated by the Korea Hydro and Nuclear Power (KHNP) organisation.

== See also ==
- List of power stations in South Korea
