= Mount Andong =

Mountain in Central Java, Indonesia

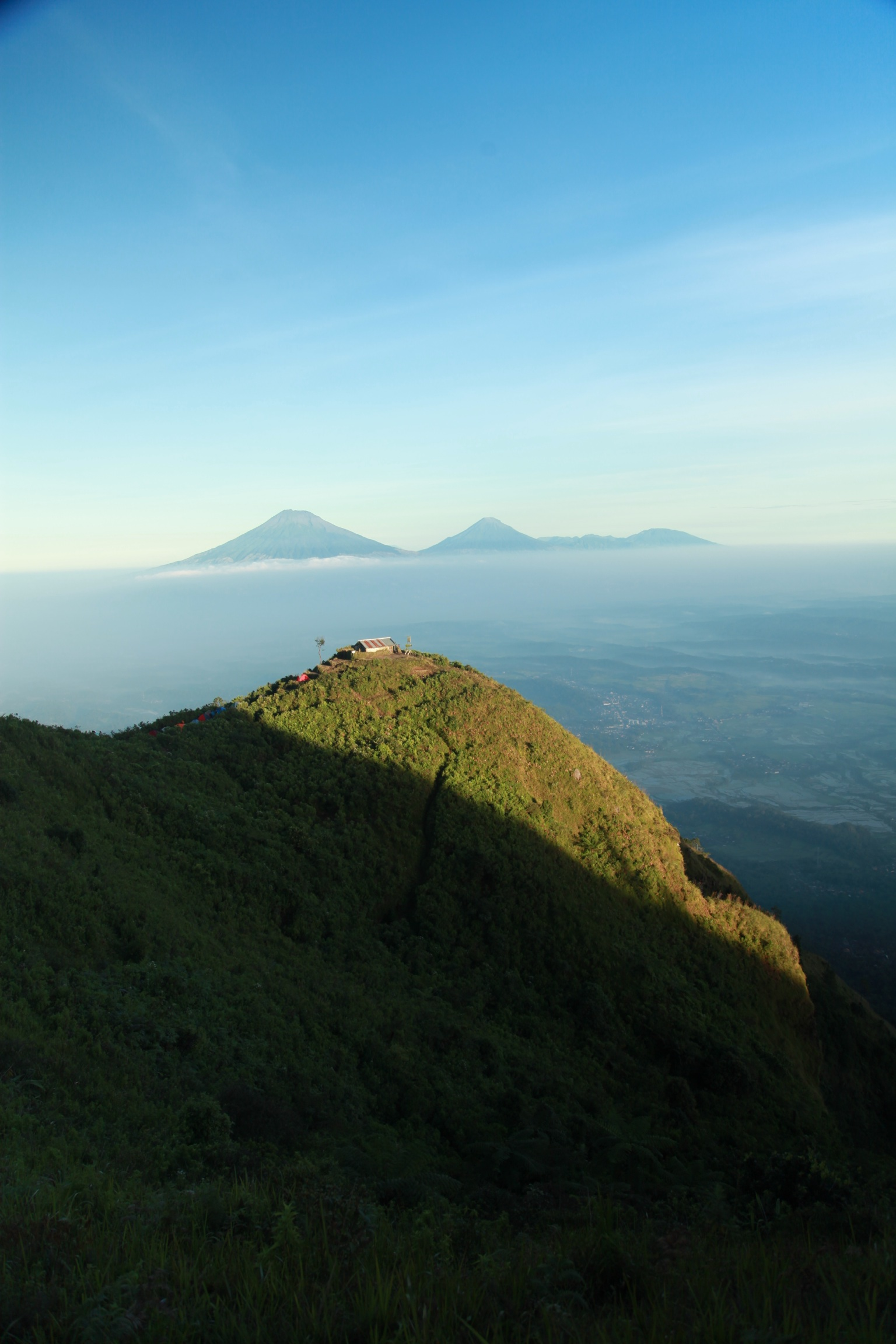
- Tomb at a peak of Mount Andong

Highest point
- Elevation: 1,463 m (4,800 ft)
- Coordinates: 7.528520°S 110.183650°E

Geography
- Location within Java Location within Indonesia
- Location: Magelang, Java, Indonesia

Geology
- Volcanic arc: Sunda Arc

Moung Andong (Indonesian: Gunung Andong) is a mountain in Magelang Regency, Central Java in Indonesia. Andong mountain is located between Ngablak and Tlogorjo, Grabag and has an altitude of around 1,463 meters. Andong Mountain is one of several mountains that encircle Magelang, adjacent to Mount Telomoyo. The mountain is on the border of the Salatiga, Semarang and Magelang regions.

Mount Andong has four peaks, namely Tomb, Soul, Andong, and Alap-alap which stretches from west to east. The highest peak is the Andong Peak.

== Tourist attraction ==
The mountain is a popular hiking place. At the top, climbers can see Mount Merapi, Merbabu, Sindoro, Sumbing, Prau, Ungaran, Telomoyo, and other Andong Mountain peaks, just by turning around.

One natural tourist destination on the slopes of Mount Andong that can be visited is Mangli Tourism Forest. Mangli forest management is under the responsibility of the Mountain Pager RPH, Ambarawa Forest Units Section which is one of the BKPH in the Perhutani Perum Pemangkuan Hutan (KPH) North Kedu region. The location of the Mangli Forest is not far from the main access road of Jogja-Semarang, which is by paved road through the Ngablak district area. On either side of the road there are clumps of shrubs and clumps of clove plants remaining in the colonial period. A variety of bamboo clumps also fence the right and left of the road with various types, ranging from petung, apus, legi, wulung to ampel. Some parts of the terracing are used by residents to plant vegetable commodities such as cabbage, carrots, long beans, eggplants, until Lombok and jetsin. Although the original includes tropical rain forest, the main vegetation in the Mangli forest is pine. There is the Mangli campground, which lies in the valley between pine trees. The campground area is quite large equipped with MCK facilities.

There is a spring within the mountain range. Also at one peak, there is a tomb of Kiai Abdul Faqih or known as Ki Joko Pekik, a figure respected by the local community. Five Mountains Festival is annually held in Mantran village on the slopes of Mount Andong to celebrate local arts and culture of the peoples living in nearby five mountains and volcanoes Andong, Menoreh, Merapi, Merbabu and Sumbing.

== See also ==
- List of volcanoes in Indonesia
