= Yeong River =

River in South Korea

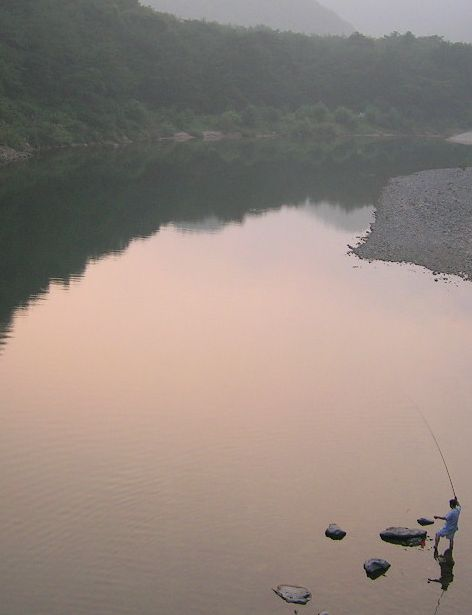

Korean name
- Hangul: 영강
- Hanja: 潁江
- RR: Yeonggang
- MR: Yŏnggang

The Yeong River (Korean: 영강) is a river in Mungyeong, North Gyeongsang Province, South Korea. It flows into the Nakdong River, which in turn flows into the Sea of Japan (East Sea). The Yeong rises from Hwabuk-myeon in Sangju, and drains most of western Mungyeong and parts of northern Sangju. From tip to tail, it covers a total of 66.2 km² and drains an area of 913.7 km². The Yeong flows into the Nakdong at the southeastern corner of Mungyeong between Yeongsun-myeon and Sangju's Sabeol-myeon.

During most of the 20th century, coal mines were widespread throughout the Yeong valley, and the quality of the river was heavily degraded. As the water has cleared in recent years, efforts have been made to improve the river's potential to support tourism. The river flows past Jinnam Bridge, which is known as one of the most beautiful places in North Gyeongsang and is a popular symbol of Mungyeong. In addition, rafting trips are now often organized along the Yeong. The river has also become a noted spot for recreational fishing for species including Korean aucha perch, catfish, dark chub, and pale chub.

The Yeong may take its name from the Ying River in China, which is identified by the same Chinese character.

== See also ==
- Rivers of Korea
- Geography of South Korea
