= Joryeongsan =

Mountain in South Korea

Coordinates: 36°46′N 128°03′E

Highest point
- Elevation: 1,017 m (3,337 ft)

Geography
- Location: South Korea

Joryeongsan is a mountain of South Korea located in the North Chungcheong province. It has an elevation of 1,017 metres.

== See also ==
- List of mountains of Korea
