= Taebaek Mountains =

Mountain range in North and South Korea

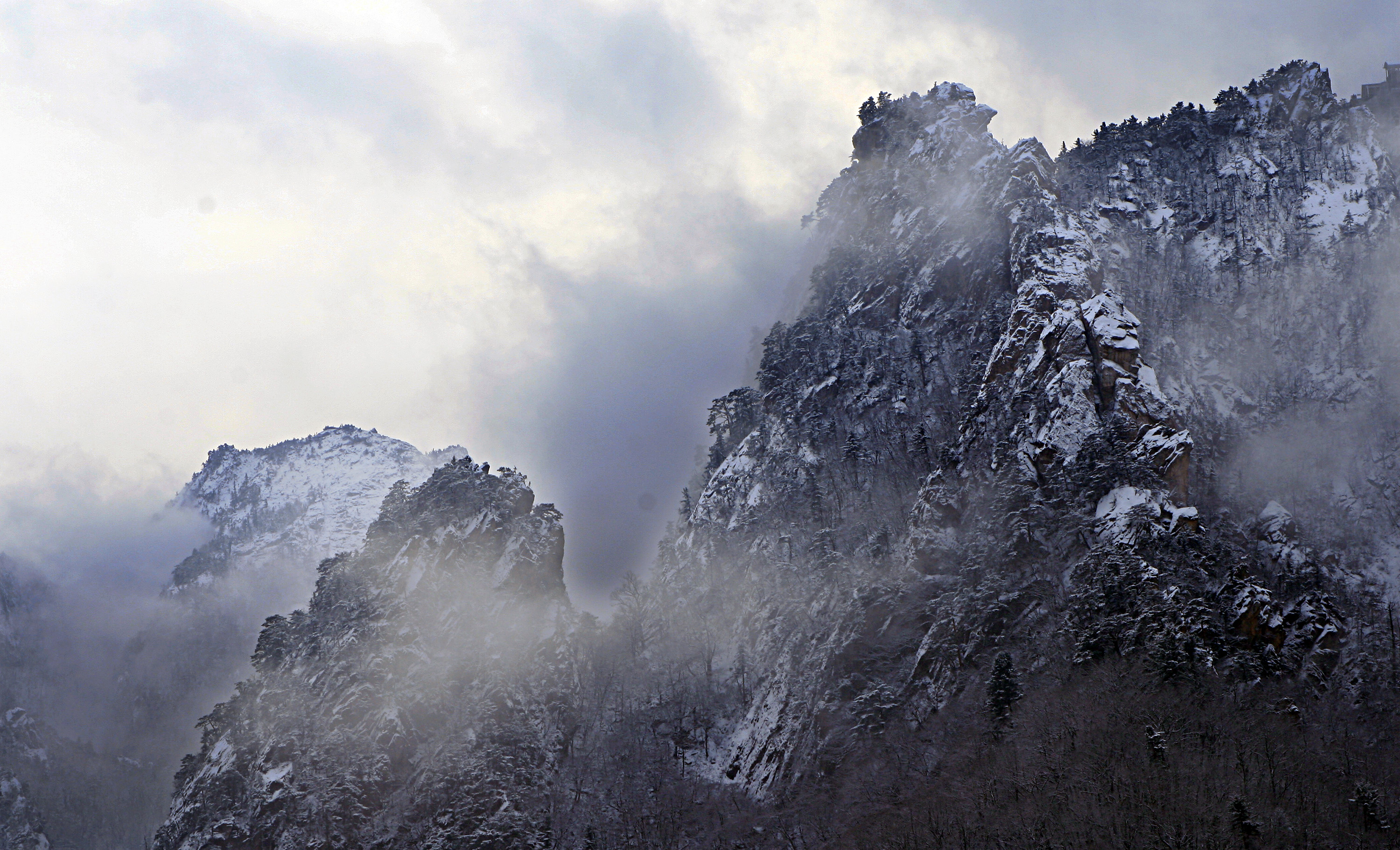
- View of Seoraksan, the highest peak of the Taebaek Mountains

Highest point
- Peak: Seoraksan, Gangwon Province, South Korea
- Elevation: 1,708 m (5,604 ft)
- Coordinates: 38°7′10″N 128°27′56″E

Dimensions
- Length: 500 km (310 mi)

Geography
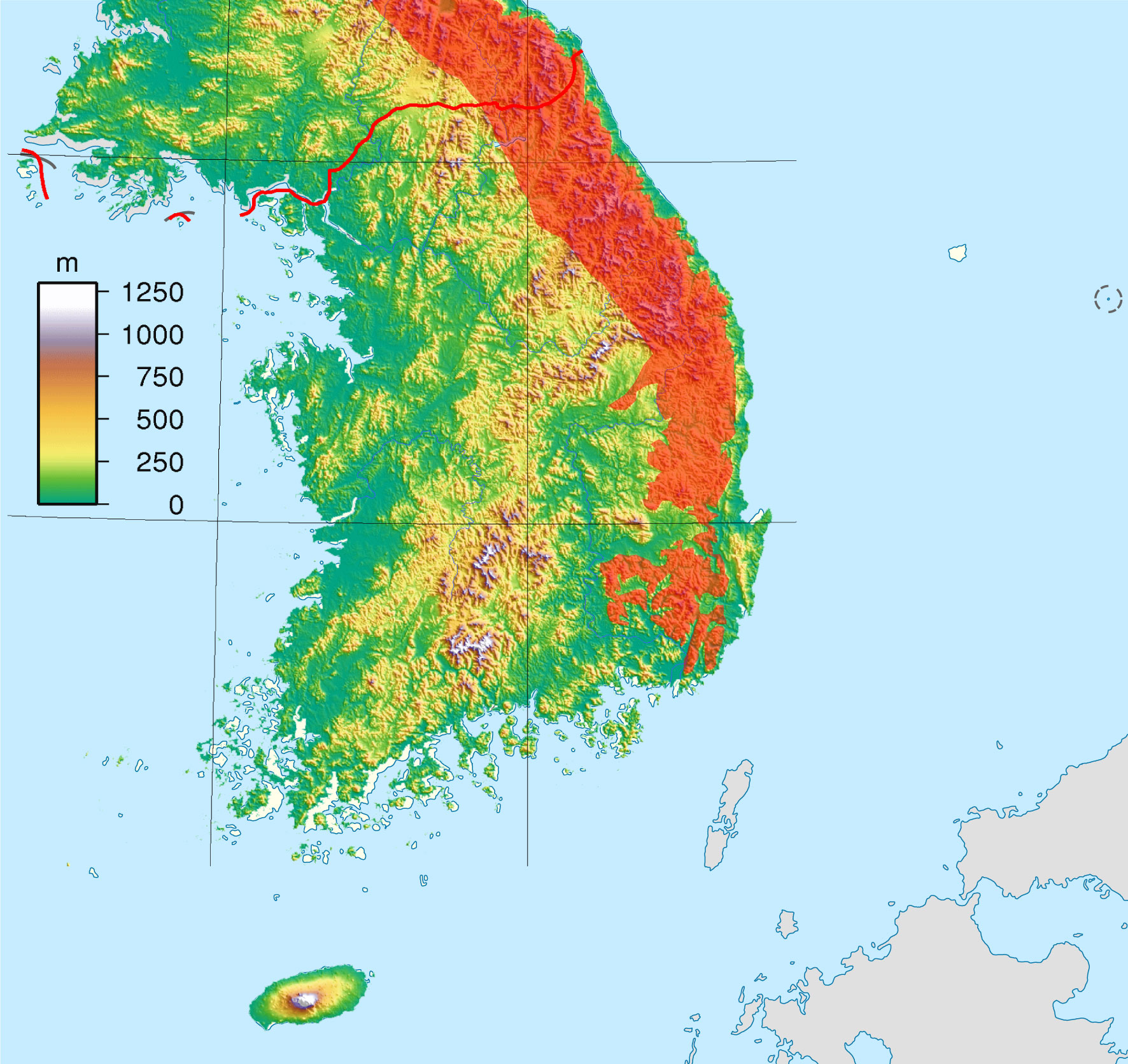
- Map of South Korea, with the Taebaek Mountain range marked in red
- Countries: North Korea; South Korea
- Range coordinates: 38°13′29″N 128°11′7″E

Korean name
- Hangul: 태백산맥
- Hanja: 太白山脈
- RR: Taebaeksanmaek
- MR: T'aebaeksanmaek

The Taebaek Mountains (Korean: 태백산맥; Hanja: 太白山脈) are a mountain range that stretches across North Korea and South Korea. They form the main ridge of the Korean Peninsula. The mountain range is the source of the Han River, which flows through Seoul, as well as the Nakdong River, the longest river in South Korea, which passes through Daegu and Busan, making it one of the most important geographical features in South Korea and the Korean Peninsula as a whole. The mountain range extends 500 to 600 kilometers, from the area near the city of Wonsan in North Korea, to the Yeongnam Alps in the south and beyond.

== Geography ==
The Taebaek Mountains are located along the eastern edge of the peninsula and run along the eastern coast of the Korean Peninsula. The Hwangnyong Mountain in North Korea (1268 meters) forms the northern end of the range. Busan lies at the southern end of this mountain range, thus making the mountain range a total length of over 500 kilometers, averaging about 1000 meters in height. The range functions as the primary watershed of the Korean Peninsula, determining the drainage patterns between the East Sea and the Yellow Sea. It exhibits a distinct asymmetric topography, characterized by steep eastern slopes descending toward the East Sea and more gradual western slopes that form the basins of major rivers such as the Han and Nakdong.

Prominent peaks of the range include Mount Seoraksan (1,708 m), Mount Kumgangsan (1,638 m), Mount Taebaeksan (1,566.7 m) and Mount Odaesan (1,563 m). To the east, the mountain range falls steeply into the sea, but to the west, there are more gentle slopes. Many spurs stretch southwest. The most important rivers of South Korea, the Han River and the Nakdong River, both originate in the Taebaek Mountains.

== Ecology ==
Many of the slopes are extensively covered in forests.

== Geology ==
The mountain range features a relatively gentle slope on the western (inland) side, while its eastern flank drops steeply toward the East Sea (also known as the Japan Sea). A notable peak in this range is Daegwanryeong, approximately 850 meters high and situated near the midpoint of the range (around latitude 37.5°N). Daegwanryeong primarily consists of Jurassic granite, representing a single large igneous intrusion.

To understand the geological history and exhumation processes of the Taebaek range, researchers applied single-grain apatite (U-Th)/He thermochronometry on samples from the eastern crustal section of Daegwanryeong. Apatite samples collected between 25 and 500 meters elevation yielded ages between approximately 21 and 26 million years (Ma), with a weighted average of about 23 Ma. The consistency of these ages across this elevation range suggests a rapid exhumation event around 23 Ma. In contrast, samples taken from higher elevations (770 m and 840 m) showed older ages of 30 Ma and 36 Ma, respectively, indicating an earlier, less intense cooling event before the rapid exhumation.

Analysis of the age-elevation relationship in the Taebaek Mountains reveals a slope break near 600 to 700 meters elevation, interpreted as the base of the previous helium partial retention zone (He-PRZ) in apatite minerals. The onset of rapid exhumation at Daegwanryeong coincides with the geological timing of the opening of the East Sea. Although the precise timing of the Japanese islands’ separation from the Eurasian continent is debated, multiple studies support an initial rifting phase during the Late Oligocene to Early Miocene.

This temporal correlation highlights the coupled development of mountain building within the Taebaek Mountain Range and basin formation in nearby back-arc settings. These processes are likely driven by large-scale transtensional tectonic movements trending northwest-north (NNW). The Early Miocene exhumation event recorded in Daegwanryeong is likely representative of tectonic uplift affecting the broader coastal mountain belts of the Korean Peninsula, including the Taebaek Mountains, and possibly extending to similar mountain systems such as Russia’s Sikhote-Alin range.

== Industry ==
Economically, the Taebaek Mountains are important for the mining of iron, coal, tungsten, fluorite, and limestone.

== Attractions ==
Manggyeongsa Temple in Hyeol-dong Taebaek, Gangwon-do Province at an altitude of 1,460 meters on Mount Taebaeksan, is a temple built to enshrine the statue of the Bodhisattva of wisdom. It was built by Jajang, a Silla Dynasty monk. The "Dragon Spring" at the entrance of the temple is known as the highest spring in Korea.

The 2018 Winter Olympics took place in Pyeongchang, Gangwon-do, located in the mountains.

Taebaek is also a name of a poomsae that is performed by the 3rd Dan black belts in Tae Kwon Do. Taebaek is mostly practised in Southern South Korea.

== See also ==
- Baekdudaegan
- List of mountains in Korea
- Geography of South Korea
- Sobaek Mountains
