= Jeomchon =

Area of Mungyeong, South Korea

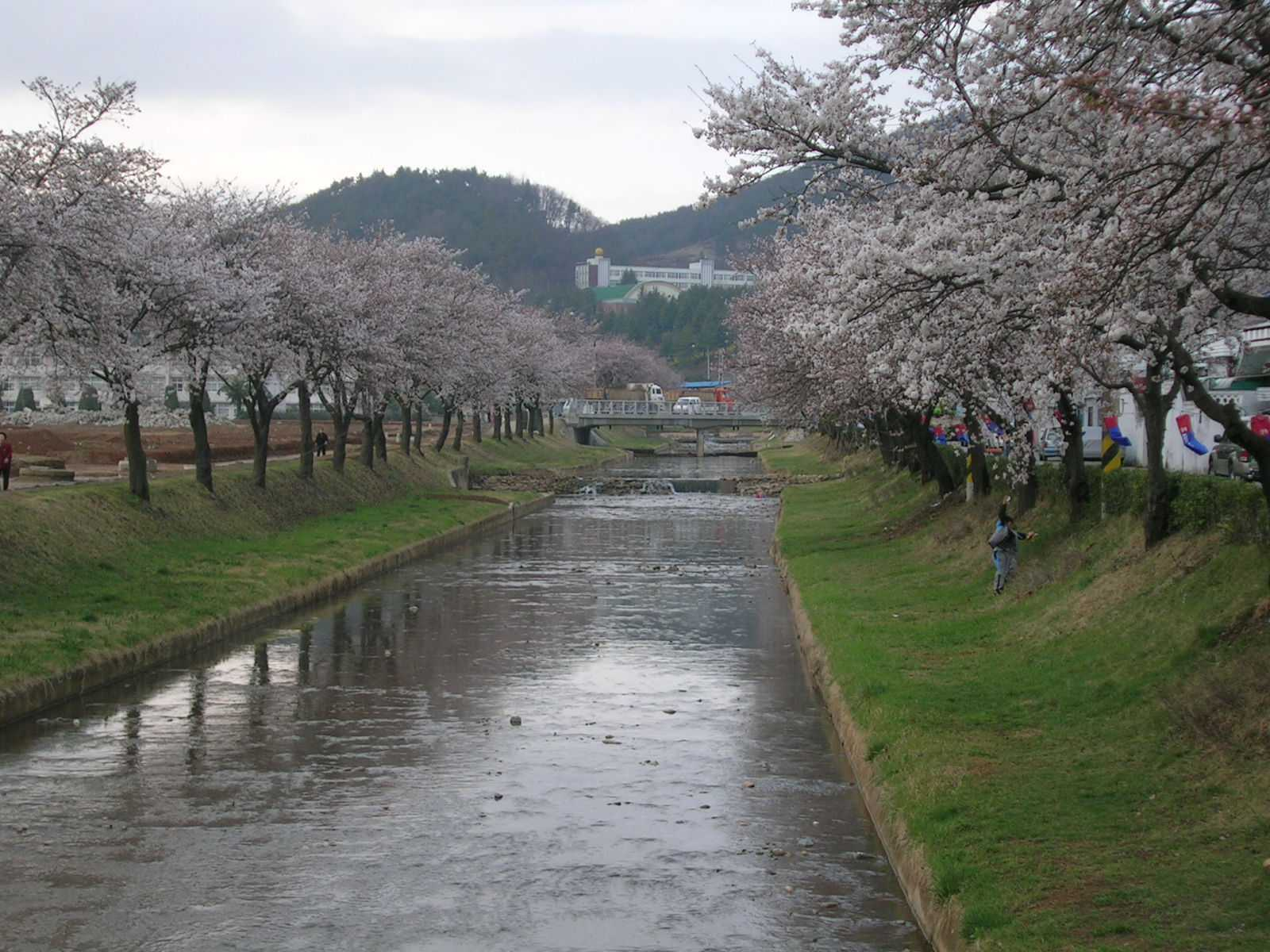
- Mojeoncheon stream in Jeomchon

Korean name
- Hangul: 점촌
- Hanja: 店村
- RR: Jeomchon
- MR: Chŏmch'on

Jeomchon is the urbanized center of Mungyeong city, in Gyeongsangbuk-do province, South Korea. The name literally means "mountain-pass village", and may refer to the low hills that run along the edge of town. It has a population of about 45,000 (based on 2003 city residence figures), on an area of roughly 45 km^{2}. Jeomchon comprises roughly the five dongs known today as Jeomchon 1-dong through Jeomchon 5-dong.

Jeomchon contains the seat of Mungyeong city government, and the city's principal bus and train stations. It is home to more than half of the city's population, although it takes up only 5% of the city's land, and thus also serves as a major economic center for Mungyeong.

From 1986 to 1995, Jeomchon was a separately-administered city. Its merger with Mungyeong County in 1995 created the present-day entity of Mungyeong-si.
