= Nakdong River =

Longest river in South Korea

Coordinates: 35°03′06″N 128°55′21″E

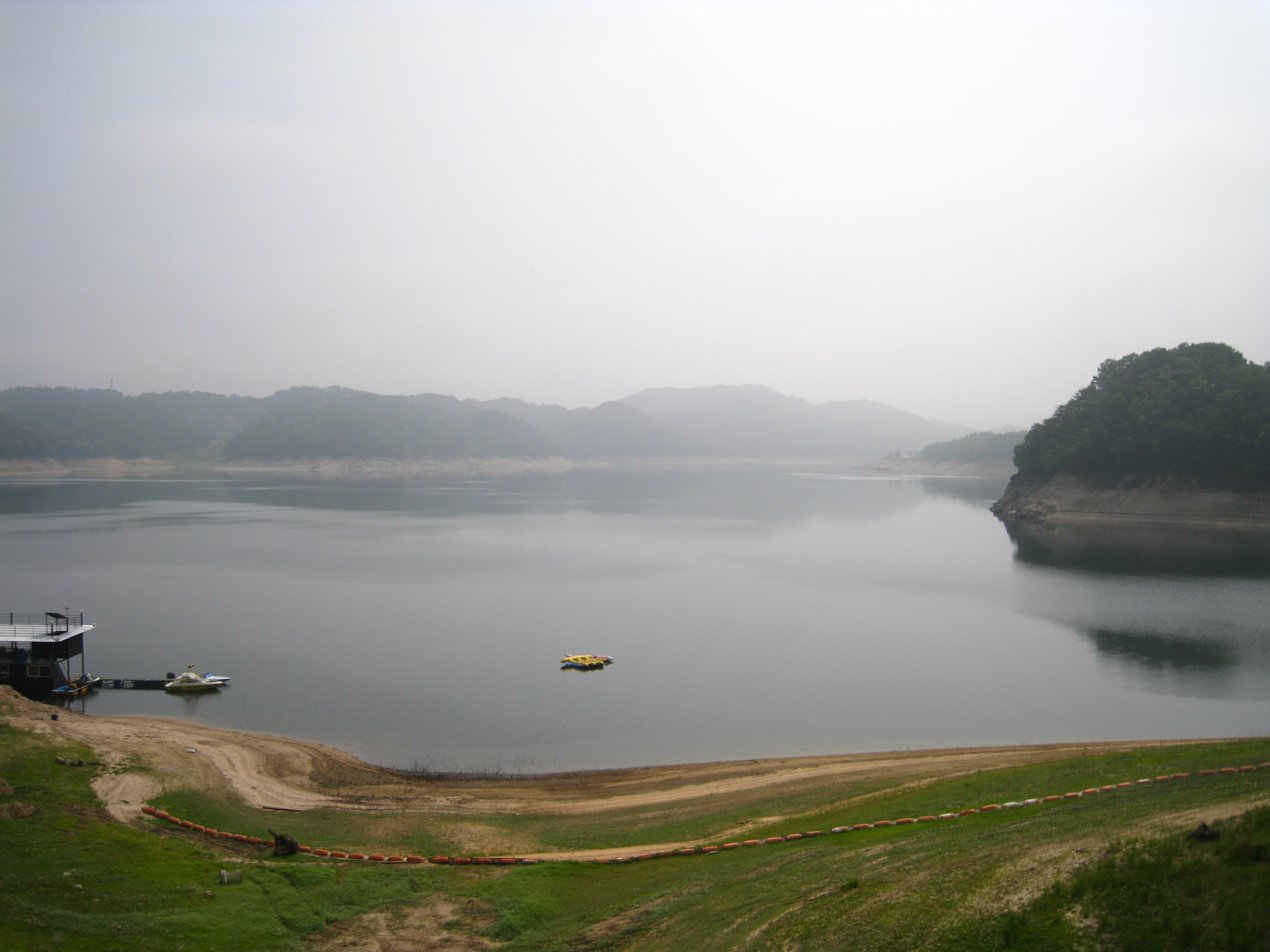
- The Nakdonggang in Andong, North Gyeongsang Province

- The Nakdonggang River
- Native name: 낙동강 (Korean)

Location
- Country: South Korea
- Provinces: Gangwon Province, North Gyeongsang Province, Daegu, South Gyeongsang Province, Busan

Physical characteristics
- Source: Taebaek Mountains
  - location: Eundae Peak, Taebaek, Gangwon (Note: Eundae Peak (1,442.3m, Korean: 은대봉; Hanja: 銀臺峰; RR: Eundaebong. The peak is also known as the Sanghambaek Mountain (상함백산) or Cheonui Peak (천의봉).))
- Mouth: East Sea
  - location: Estuary Bank, Gangseo, Busan
- Length: 510 km (320 mi)
- Basin size: 23,384 km^{2} (9,029 sq mi)
- Discharge
  - location: Jindong, Haman (Note: Discharge average from 2004 to 2013.)
  - average: 383 m^{3}/s (13,500 cu ft/s) (Note: Discharge average from 2004 to 2013.)

Basin features
- Tributaries
  - left: Banbyeoncheon, Geumho River, Miryang River, Yangsancheon, West Nakdong River †
  - right: Naeseongcheon, Gamcheon, Hwang River, Nam River
- † : Distributary of Nakdonggang

- Nakdong River
- Hangul: 낙동강
- Hanja: 洛東江
- RR: Nakdonggang
- MR: Naktonggang

The Nakdong River or Nakdonggang (Korean: 낙동강, pronounced [nak̚t͈oŋgaŋ]) (Note: In the 19th century, it was also known in English sources as Nam-tong River or Nam-tong Kang. The name was romanized as Naktong during the Korean War.) is the longest river in South Korea, which passes through the major cities of Daegu and Busan. It takes its name from its role as the eastern border of the Gaya confederacy during Korea's Three Kingdoms Era.

== Geography ==
The Nakdong River flows from the Taebaek Mountains to the South Sea or Korea Strait, which separates Korea from Japan. The river originates from the junction of the Cheoramcheon and Hwangjicheon streams in Dongjeom-dong, Taebaek, Gangwon Province at Gumunso. From there to its mouth it winds for about 506 kilometres (314 mi). The width of the river ranges from only a few metres in its upper reaches to several hundred metres towards its estuary.

Major tributaries include the Yeong, Geumho, and Nam rivers. Together with its tributaries, the Nakdonggang drains most of North Gyeongsang and South Gyeongsang provinces, along with small portions of North Jeolla, South Jeolla, and Gangwon provinces. The total watershed is 23,384 square kilometres (9,029 mi^{2}).

== History ==
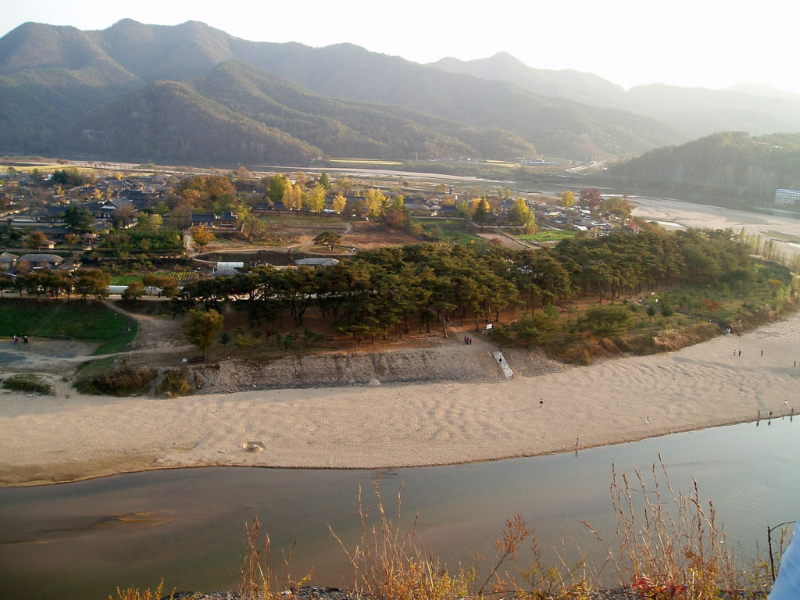
Hahoe Folk Village

The Nakdong has played an important role throughout Korean history. The river basin has been a favored dwelling-place for as long as people have inhabited the Korean Peninsula. Numerous Neolithic remains have been found in the valley.

Around the 1st century, the valley is believed to have been inhabited by the Byeonhan confederacy tribes. During the Three Kingdoms period, the Gaya confederacy controlled the valley until they were overrun by Silla in 562. These states exploited the river's potential for navigation and commerce, operating a thriving trade in armor and weapons with neighboring countries, including Yamato period Japan. Through the Silla, Goryeo, and Joseon periods, the river continued to serve as a major transportation corridor in the Gyeongsang region. It was especially used for transporting inland fresh seafood, such as mackerel, which were salted and dried to prevent them from spoiling. The city of Andong was the farthest inland the fish could be brought before going bad, so many people flocked there during the Joseon dynasty to eat fish.

As a barrier to movement, the Nakdong River gained sudden prominence during the Korean War. The southern length of the river formed the western portion of the Pusan Perimeter, which the UN forces fought to maintain during the autumn of 1950. The bridge at Waegwan was blown up on August 3, 1950, in an effort to prevent North Korean forces from advancing on Daegu. A large number of South Korean refugees were killed in the explosion. Although some North Korean forces did cross the Nakdong River in places, for the most part the river marked their furthest advance.

== Ecology ==
The Nakdong River valley includes numerous floodplain wetlands, the most well-known of which are the Junamjeosuji Reservoir near Changwon and Upo Wetland in Changnyeong County. These wetlands, while significantly degraded and overdeveloped, provide habitat to a significant number of rare and threatened species, most especially birds (such as the Baikal teal and White-naped crane), fish and plants.

Despite being home to the bustling Port of Busan, the Nakdonggang estuary is internationally important for waterbirds, despite recent ecologically-destructive developments including reclamation for housing and industry (e.g. the Busan New Port), the ongoing construction of a major bridge (the Miyeonji Bridge) and most recently the threatened construction of the Korean Grand Canal project.

The Nakdonggang and its tributaries serve as a major source of drinking water for the inhabitants of the river basin and others nearby. However, water pollution from domestic and agricultural wastewater remains a serious concern.

=== Phenol contamination ===
In 1991, there were two incidents where phenol was leaked into the river from Doosan Electronics. There were two leaks, the first thirty tons on March 14, 1991 and the second 1.3 tons on April 22. The phenol ended up at a water processing facility used for drinking water in Daegu and began to smell after converting to chlorophenol when the water was sanitized with chlorine.

== Economic role ==
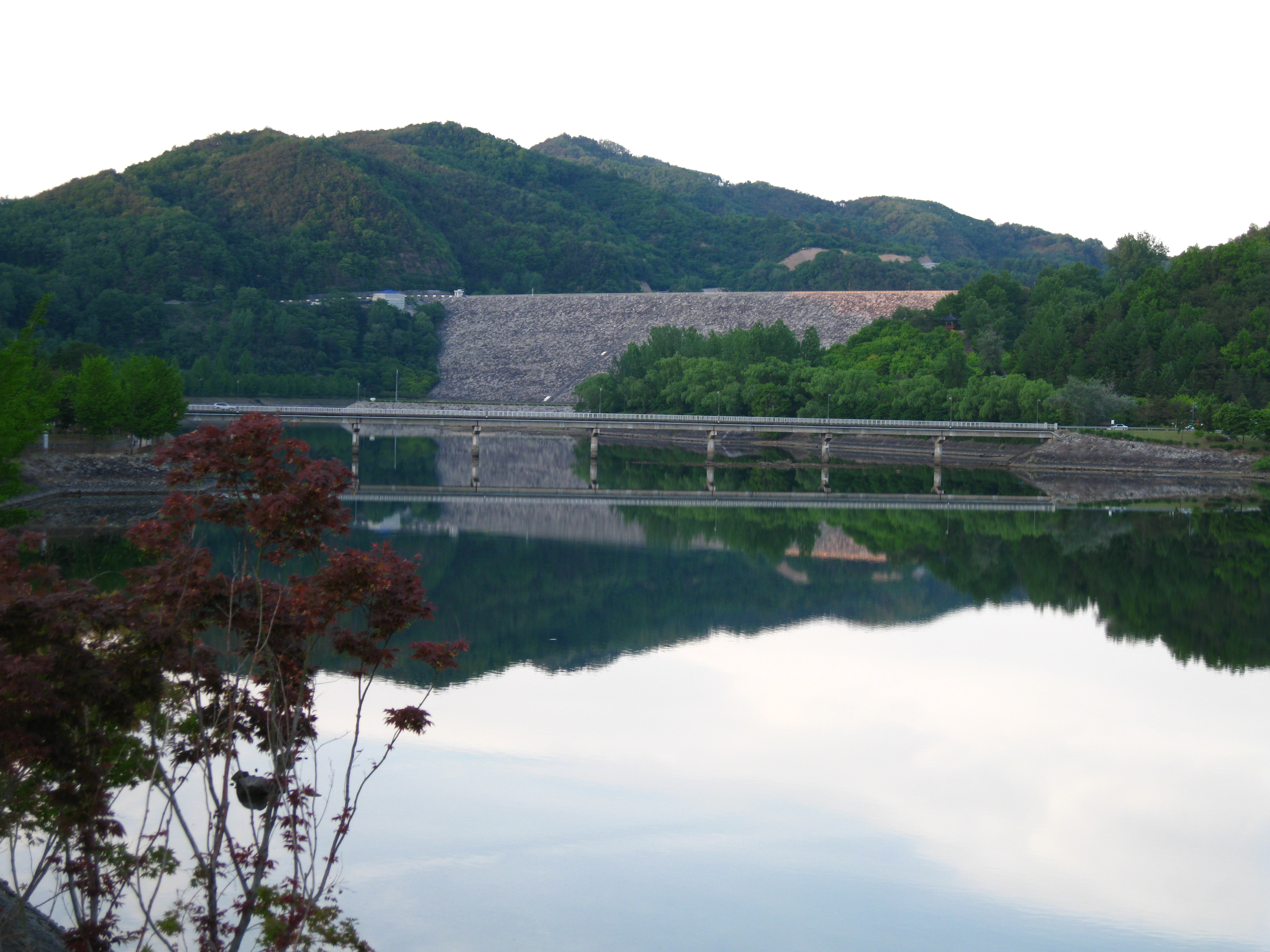
Andong Dam

Although all but the southernmost reaches of the Nakdonggang River have ceased to serve as a major commercial waterway, the river continues to feed those dwelling near it, both directly through fishing and indirectly through irrigation. Substantial amounts of snails and catfish are taken from the waters and used in local cuisine.

Near Andong, a series of massive hydroelectric dams have been constructed, creating a small chain of artificial lakes of which Andong Lake is the largest. These lakes also support a substantial recreational industry. Bass fishing is especially popular, since the lakes have been artificially stocked with bass.

In the early 2010s, the Nakdonggang River was to be part of President Lee Myung-bak's canal project, the Grand Korean Waterway. The project would link the Nakdong with the Han River to the north, creating a shipping canal spanning the length of the country, from Seoul to Busan. Encountering considerable controversy nationwide as well as from residents along the Nakdonggang, the waterway project was scrapped by the end of Lee's presidency.

== Festival ==
The Nakdong River Cultural Center holds bicycle festivals that everyone can enjoy the healthy leisure culture of local residents. It is composed of flat courses about 20 km in the vicinity of Eulsukdo and Nakdonggang River Cultural Center.

== See also ==
- List of rivers of Asia
- West Nakdong River

== Bibliography ==
- "Corea" , Encyclopædia Britannica, vol. VI (9th ed.), New York: Charles Scribner's Sons, 1878, pp. 390–394.
