= Sobaek Mountains =

Mountain range in South Korea

Coordinates: 35°20′16″N 127°43′50″E

- Hangul: 소백산맥
- Hanja: 小白山脈
- RR: Sobaeksanmaek
- MR: Sobaeksanmaek

Location of the Sobaek Mountains

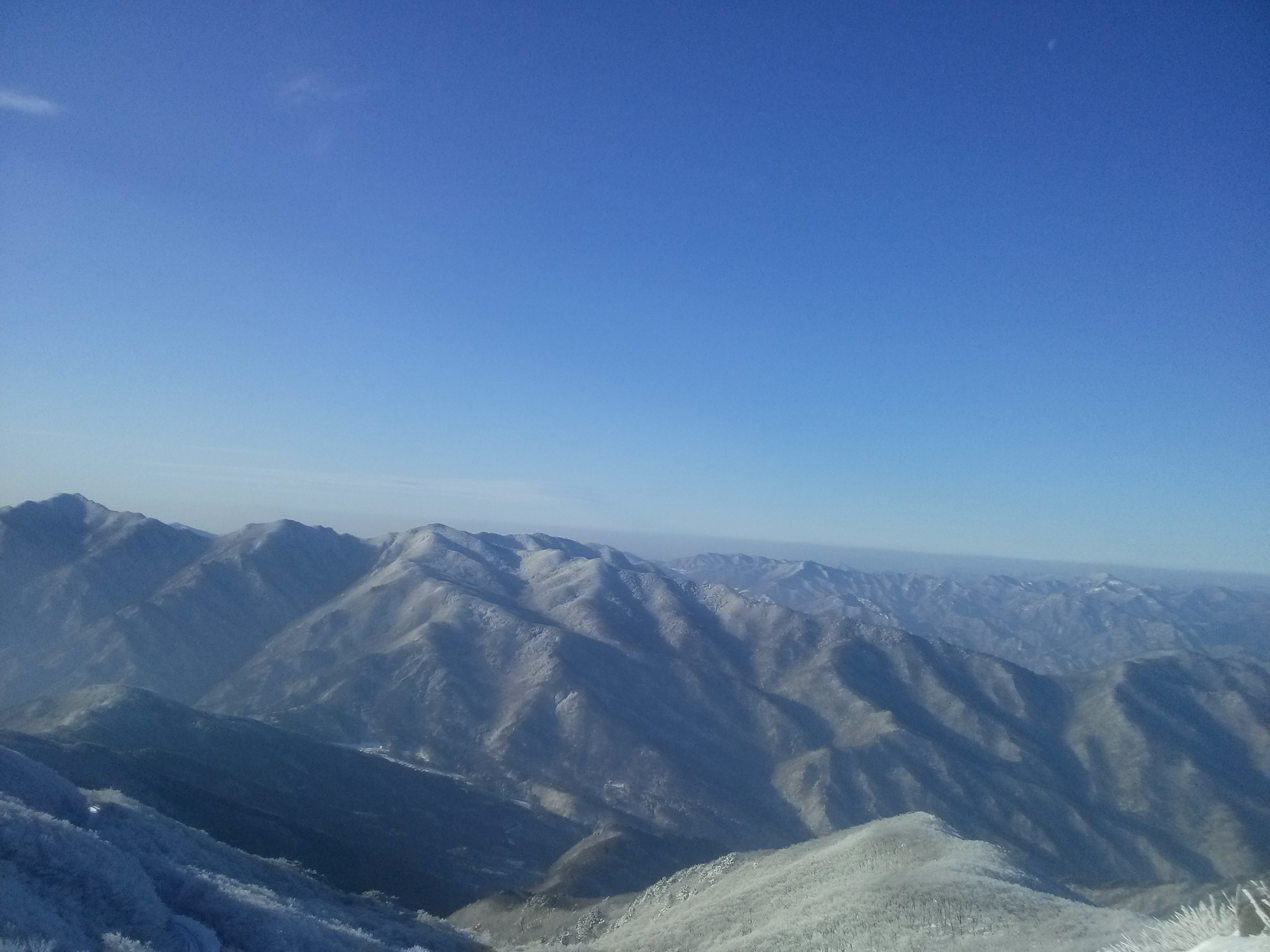
Landscape of Sobaek Mountain.

The Sobaek Mountains (Korean: 소백산맥, literally meaning "Little Taebaek Mountains") are a mountain range cutting across the southern Korean Peninsula. They split off from the Taebaek Mountains and trend southwest across the center of the peninsula. They are traditionally considered to reach their southwestern limit at Jirisan, which, at an elevation of 1,915 meters, is also the highest peak of the range. Other famous mountains in the range include Songni Mountain, Joryeong Mountain, Gaya Mountain, Worak Mountain, and Sobaek Mountain itself. The peaks of the Sobaek Mountains are generally well over 1,000 m above sea level.

The Sobaek Mountains form the southern half of the Baekdu-daegan, the symbolic "spine" of Korea. They mark the traditional border between the Honam and Yeongnam regions.

== See also ==
- Baekdudaegan
- Geography of South Korea
- List of mountains in Korea
