= Hwangjicheon =

Stream in Taebaek, South Korea

Coordinates: 37°05′32″N 129°02′34″E

Physical characteristics
- Mouth: Hwajeon-dong, Taebaek, Gangwon Province, South Korea
- Length: 29.1 km

Hwangjicheon (Korean: 황지천; Hanja: 黃池川) is a stream in Taebaek, South Korea and a headwater of Nakdong River, the longest river in South Korea. It originates in Hwajeon-dong, Taebaek, Gangwon Province, with a maximum flow path length of 29.1 km, a maximum straight-line length of 27.8 km, and a drainage basin area of 204.1 km^{2}. The stream flows through Hwangji-dong, Mungok-dong, Jangseong-dong, and Dongjeom-dong, and ends at Gumunso, where it merges with Cheoramcheon (철암천) to begin the Nakdong River.

The stream is home to many flora and fauna. A 2021 survey by Nakdonggang National Institute of Biological Resources identified 297 species of plants in Hwangjicheon. According to a 2020 literature review, 223 different taxa of vascular plants have been identified in Hwangjicheon, including Korean endemic plants Salix koriyanagi Forsythia koreana, Lonicera subsessilis, and Aster koraiensis.

Near the stream are many abandoned lead, zinc, and coal mines, including Yeonhwa Mine, Hamtae Coal Mine, and Eoryong Mine. The mine runoff pose a pollution risk, with reddish discolorations being observed in some parts of the stream. A 2019 survey showed that toxic runoff from coal mines had decreased biodiversity in the affected sections of the stream. To address heavy metal contamination and improve water quality, Taebaek city and the Korea Mine Rehabilitation and Mineral Resources Corporation (한국광해광업공단) renovated the Seongwon Mine purification facility from December 2015 to June 2019.

Tens of thousands of years ago, Hwangjicheon used to form a horseshoe-shaped meander as it flowed into Gumunso and deposited well-rounded gravel with interbedded sand. The sharp bend eventually eroded a hole in the mountain, creating Gumunso's iconic stone tunnel and cutting off the meander. Today, this abandoned channel consists of farmlands and formed a region called Sagundari (사군다리). Hwangjicheon is referenced in the 1530 geography book Sinjŭng Tongguk yŏji sŭngnam, which notes: "Hwangjicheon is located 110 ri west of Samcheok-bu. Its waters flow south for about 30 ri, piercing through a small mountain and continuing southward—called Cheoncheon".

== Hwangji pond ==
Most of Hwangjicheon's water flows from three ponds called Hwangji, also called Cheonhwang (천황; 天潢), outputting 5,000 tons of water daily. The three ponds have perimeters of 100m, 50m, and 30m. They are at an altitude of 700m. Before the construction of Gwangdong Dam in 1989, Hwangji served as a primary water source for nearby residents, and still serves as one during severe droughts. The city has developed Hwangji into a park.

The name Hwangji comes from a local legend. According to the story, a wealthy man named Hwang Dong-ji (황동지; 黃同知) once lived where Hwangji is now located. One day, a monk came to his house asking for alms. Instead of helping, Hwang insulted the monk by giving him cow dung. However, his daughter-in-law saw what happened, apologized to the monk, and offered him a bucket of rice. The monk then told her to follow him and warned her not to look back, as disaster was about to strike the house. She obeyed and followed him, but when she heard a thundering noise behind her—Hwang's house collapsing and turning into ponds—she instinctively looked back. In that moment, she turned to stone.
