= Geology of South Korea =

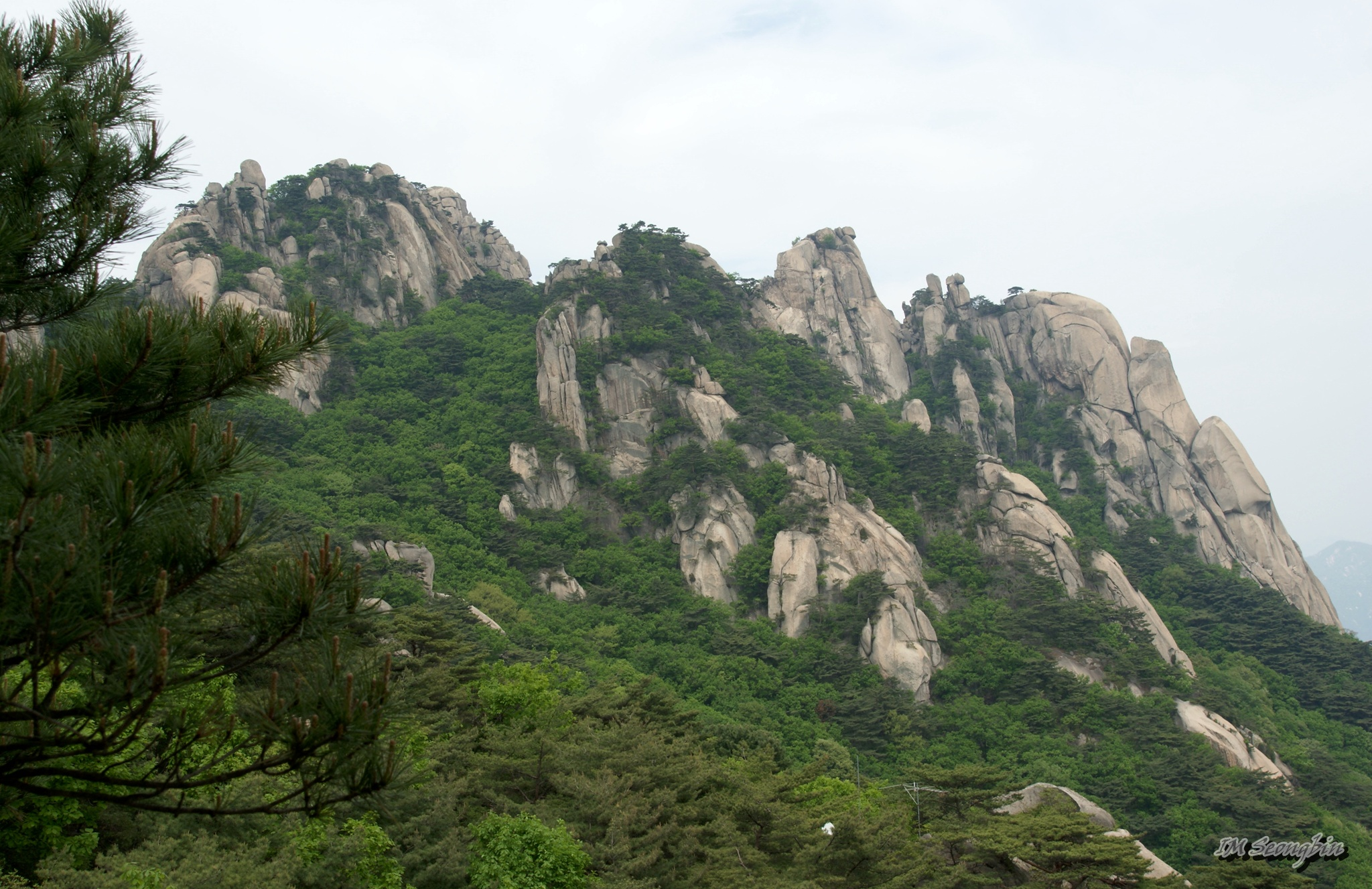
Dobongsan Peaks (도봉산 정산)

The geology of South Korea includes rocks dating to the Archean and two large massifs of metamorphic rock as the crystalline basement, overlain by thick sedimentary sequences, younger metamorphic rocks and volcanic deposits. Despite the country's small size, its geology is diverse, containing rocks formed during the Precambrian to Cenozoic eras.

== Geologic history, stratigraphy, and tectonics ==
The K'yŏnggi Massif and Yongnam Massif lie north and south of the Okch'on-T'aebaeksan Zone respectively. They are both polymetamorphic gneiss and schist complexes from the Precambrian and underlie the entire Republic of Korea. Units range in age from the Archean to the Proterozoic, with metamorphic facies from greenschist to amphibolite grade. Some geologists have attempted to correlate the rocks with North China-North Korea Paraplatform and Yangtze Paraplatform rocks although these categorizations are uncertain.

=== Precambrian (–539 million years ago) ===
The rate which Precambrian rocks occupy in Korean Peninsula is 40%. The Korea Peninsula formed mostly after the Paleoproterozoic (2,500 to 1,600 million years ago), and Archean rocks appear in some regions.

=== Paleozoic (539–251 million years ago) ===
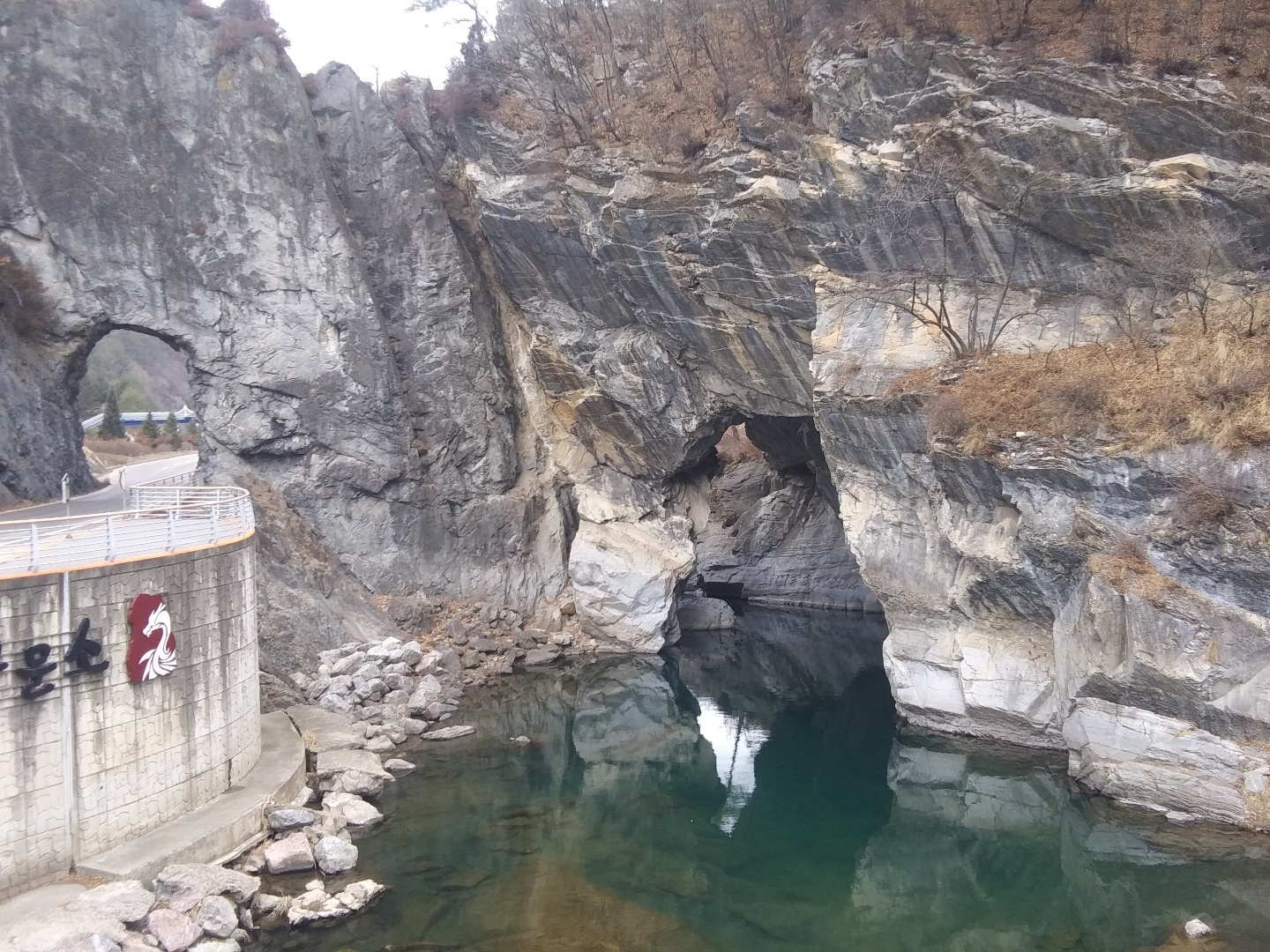
Gumunso, where early Paleozoic formation can be found. (Joseon Supergroup Makgol limestone Formation)

Rock formations formed during the Paleozoic are composed of the Joseon Supergroup (lower) and Pyeongan Supergroup (upper).

==== Joseon Supergroup ====
From the early Cambrian to the Ordovician in the early Paleozoic, the Joseon Supergroup was formed, and it was distributed in the Pyeongnam Basin and Okcheon Fold Belt. The early Paleozoic Joseon Supergroup in Korea has been divided into the Taebaek, Yeongwol, Pyeongchang, Yongtan and Mungyeong groups, depending on the sequence of lithology. Taebaek group that located in Taebaek, Samcheok is composed of the Jangsan, Myobong, Daegi, Sesong, Hwajeol, Dongjeom, Dumugol (Dumu-dong), Makgol (Makgol), Jigunsan, Duwibong Formations. The Yeongwol group is composed of the Sambangsan, Machari, Wagok, Mungok, Yeongheung Formations. The geological table of the Joseon Supergroup is as follows.

Geologic time scale	Taebaek Area				Yeongwol Area			Pyeongnam Area
Geologic time scale	division	Formation Name	Thickness(m)	Distribution region	Formation Name	Rock	Thickness(m)	Pyeongnam Area
Ordovician; 443.8–485.4 Mya	upper great limestone group	Duwibong limestone	50		Yeongheung	shale limestone	-	Sangseo-ri; Mandal; Singok
Ordovician; 443.8–485.4 Mya	upper great limestone group	Jigunsan shale	50~100		Yeongheung	shale limestone	-	Sangseo-ri; Mandal; Singok
Ordovician; 443.8–485.4 Mya	upper great limestone group	Makgol limestone	250~400	Taebaek	Yeongheung	shale limestone	-	Sangseo-ri; Mandal; Singok
Ordovician; 443.8–485.4 Mya	upper great limestone group	Dumugol shale (Odu)	150~200	Baegun Mt. Syncline Zone	Mungok	limestone Dolomite	120~200	Sangseo-ri; Mandal; Singok
Ordovician; 443.8–485.4 Mya	upper great limestone group	Dongjeom Quartzite (Od)	50	Baegun Mt. Syncline Zone	Mungok	limestone Dolomite	120~200	Sangseo-ri; Mandal; Singok
Cambrian; 485.4–538.8 Mya	lower great limestone formation	Hwajeol (CEw); Sesong	200~260	Baegun Mt. Syncline Zone; East Danyang	Wagok	limestone Dolomite	200~500	Gopung
Cambrian; 485.4–538.8 Mya	lower great limestone formation	Daegi(Pungchone limestone) (CEp)	150~300	Baegun Mt. Syncline Zone; Southeast Jeongseon	Machari (Om)	shale limestone Dolomite	420	Mujin
Cambrian; 485.4–538.8 Mya	Yangdeok Formation (C)	Myobong Slate (CEm)	80~250		Sambangsan (cs)	Sandstone shale	-	heuggyo(C)
Cambrian; 485.4–538.8 Mya	Yangdeok Formation (C)	Jangsan Quartzite (CEj)	150~200	Baegun Mt. Syncline Zone; Danyang				Junghwa(C)

==== Pyeongan Supergroup ====
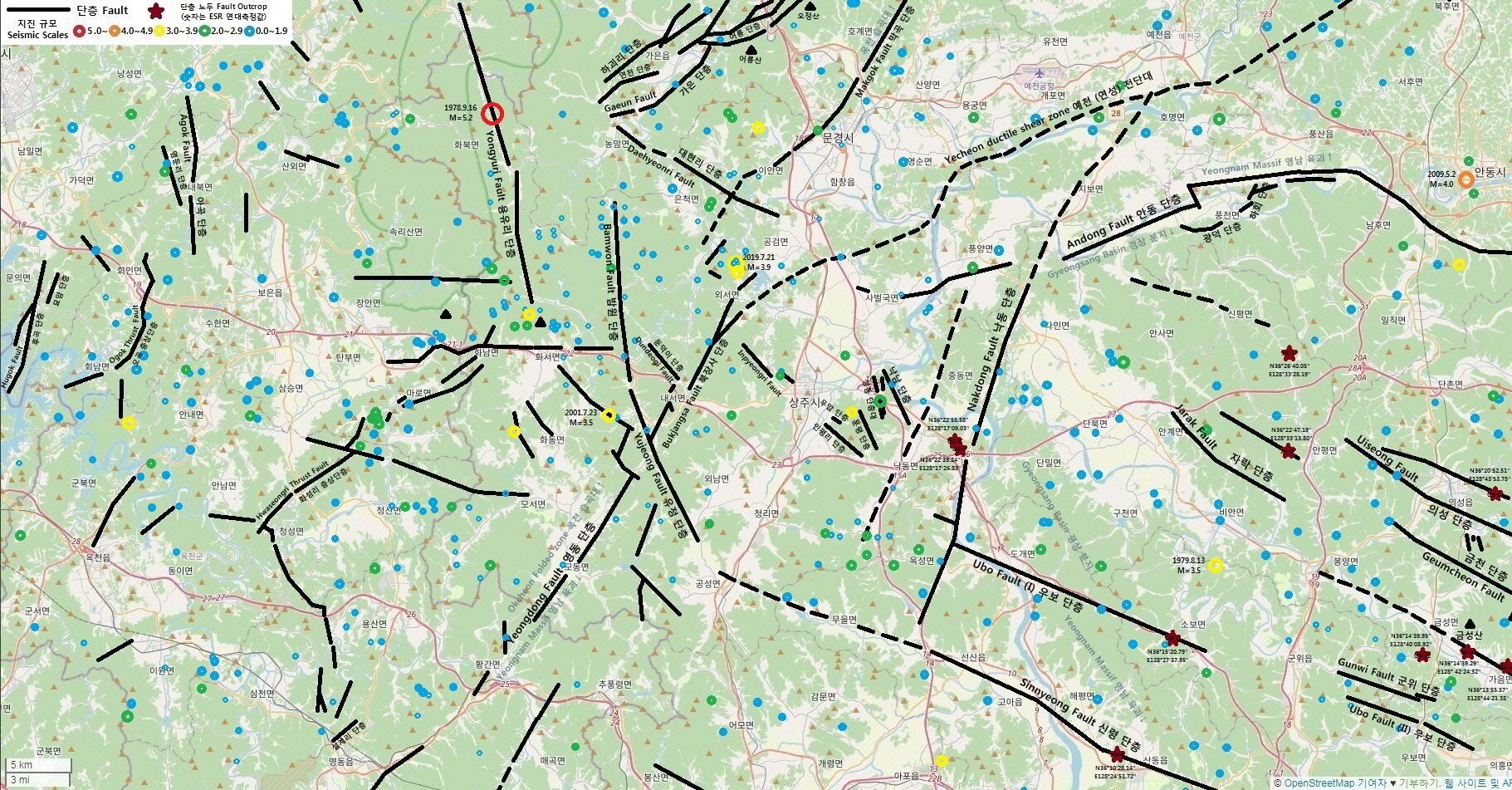
The border region of Gyeongsang Basin, Yongnam Massif, Okcheon Fold Belt in Sangju Area (using OpenStreetMap)

From the Carboniferous to Triassic, the Pyeongan Supergroup was formed, and it was distributed in the Pyeongnam Basin and Okcheon Folded Zone.

The geology and stratigraphy of the Pyeongan Supergroup are as follows.

Geologic time scale			Area							
period	Epoch	Age	Samcheok	Gangneung	Jeongseon-Pyeongchang	Yeongwol	Danyang	Boeun	Pyeongnam Basin	Duman Basin
Mesozoic Triassic; 201.3–252.17 Mya	Mid 237–247.2 Mya	Anisian	Donggo (Formation)		Bakjisan		Donggo		taejawon	
Mesozoic Triassic; 201.3–252.17 Mya	Early 247.2–252.17 Mya	Induan	Donggo (Formation)		Sangwonsan		Donggo		taejawon	
Paleozoic; Permian; 252.17–298.9 Mya	Lopingian 252.17–259.8 Mya								Gobangsan	Songsang
Paleozoic; Permian; 252.17–298.9 Mya	Guadalupian; 259.8–272.3 Mya	Capitanian	Gohan	Unbyeolri	Okgapsan		Gohan		Gobangsan	Songsang
Paleozoic; Permian; 252.17–298.9 Mya	Guadalupian; 259.8–272.3 Mya	Wordian	Dosagok	Mangdeoksan	Okgapsan		Dosagok		Gobangsan	Songsang
Paleozoic; Permian; 252.17–298.9 Mya	Guadalupian; 259.8–272.3 Mya	Roadian	Dosagok	Mangdeoksan	Okgapsan		Dosagok		Gobangsan	Songsang
Paleozoic; Permian; 252.17–298.9 Mya	Cisuralian; 272.3–298.9 Mya	Cisuralian	Hambaeksan	Hambaeksan	Okgapsan		Hambaeksan	Hambaeksan	Gobangsan	Gyeryongsan
Paleozoic; Permian; 252.17–298.9 Mya	Cisuralian; 272.3–298.9 Mya	Artinskian	Jangseong	Jangseong	Jangseong	Mitan	Jangseong	Jangseong	Sadong	Gyeryongsan
Paleozoic; Permian; 252.17–298.9 Mya	Cisuralian; 272.3–298.9 Mya	Sakmarian			Bamchi	Bamchi		Bamchi	Sadong	Amgi
Paleozoic; Permian; 252.17–298.9 Mya	Cisuralian; 272.3–298.9 Mya	Asselian			Bamchi	Bamchi		Bamchi	ibseog	Amgi
Paleozoic; Carboniferous; 252.17–298.9 Mya	Pennsylvanian; 298.9–323.2 Mya	Moscovian	Geumcheon	Geumcheon	Geumcheon	Pangyo	Geumcheon		hongjeom	
Paleozoic; Carboniferous; 252.17–298.9 Mya	Pennsylvanian; 298.9–323.2 Mya	Moscovian	Manhang	Manhang	Manhang	Yobong	Manhang	Manhang	hongjeom	
Paleozoic; Carboniferous; 252.17–298.9 Mya	Pennsylvanian; 298.9–323.2 Mya	Bashkirian	Manhang		Manhang	Yobong	Manhang			

==== Okchon (folded) Zone ====
The Okch'ŏn Zone likely formed in mid-Cambrian times with faulting, interpreted from olistolith limestone breccia.

In contrast to the Chŏsun Supergroup, the Okch'ŏn Supergroup crops out in the central Okch'on-T'aebaeksan Zone with thick sequences of metasedimentary and metavolcanic rocks. Some geologists have interpreted the supergroup as a series of nappe formations that took shape in a Cambrian intracratonic basin. Above the volcanic and sedimentary sequence in the middle part of the supergroup are jumbled rocks formed from submarine debris flows during rifting and contain granite, gneiss, quartzite, limestone, mudstone and basic volcanic rock fragments.

At first, the Taebo orogeny was credited with the folding, thrusting and metamorphism but Cluzel, Jolivet and Cadet in 1991 named the Okch'on orogeny to explain Silurian and Devonian deformation.

South Korea has no Silurian or Devonian sedimentary rocks, but sedimentation began again on a sinking paralic platform inland from the proto-Japan as it formed beginning in the Carboniferous. The P'yŏngan Supergroup outcrops northeast of the Okch'on Zone, subdivided into the Hongjom Formation gray mudstone, limestone and mudstone, Sadong Formation sandstone, mudstone and coal seams, Kobangsan Formation coarse terrestrial sandstone and mudstone, and Nogam Formation green sandstone and mudstone.

=== Mesozoic (251–66 million years ago) ===
During the Triassic at the beginning of the Mesozoic, as sedimentation continued in the P'yŏngan Supergroup, the Sŏngnim tectonic event affected the Okch'on-T'aebaeksan Zone, although it only caused slight faulting and warping of the major supergroup strata. Geologists have inferred that the event was related to deformation further west in Indonesia.

The event generated dextral strike-slip faulting in intermontane troughs in the Kyonggi Massif, in which the terrestrial sediments of the Taedong Supergroup accumulated. The rocks in the basin include two sequences of conglomerate grading to sandstone, mudstone, and coal beds. The Taedong Supergroup has extensive fossils, particularly crustaceans.

==== Daebo Orogeny ====
The Daebo orogeny is a major orogenic event in Korea, that involved widespread plutonism and tectonism in Korean peninsula during Jurassic to Early Cretaceous in Korea. in the Jurassic is broadly similar, and possibly linked to the Yanshanian movement in China. The event ended with the batholith intrusions of the Daebo granites which outcrop over 30 percent of the country. It is suggested that the Lower Cretaceous Myogok Formation was deposited during the end of the Daebo Orogeny.

==== Gyeongsang Basin ====
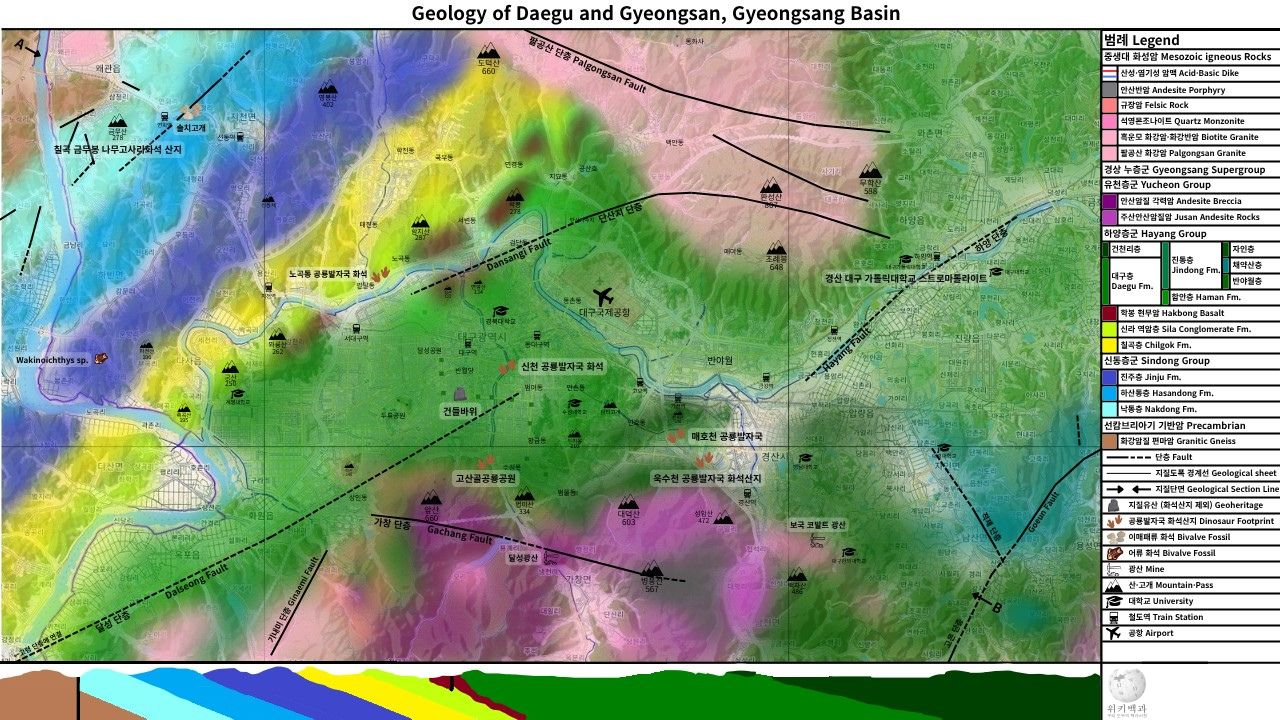
The Geology map of Daegu City and Gyeongsan City located in the middle of Gyeongsang Basin

The Gyeongsang Basin is a basin that was formed during the Cretaceous. It occupies most of the Yeongnam region and part of the Honam region.

The Gyeongsang Basin is composed of the Gyeongsang Supergroup, which consists of Sindong, Hayang, Yucheon group, and Bulguksa Granite. The Sindong Group is the lowest stratigraphic sequence in the Cretaceous Gyeongsang Basin and comprises three stratigraphic units: the Nakdong, Hasandong, and Jinju Formation in ascending order. Hayang group is mid group of Gyeongsang supergroup. Yucheon group is the top group of Gyeongsang supergroup.

Kyŏngsang rocks are intruded by microlite, diorite and granodiorite from the late Cretaceous.

=== Cenozoic (66 million years ago–present) ===
Volcanic activity continued into the Cenozoic ending 50 million years ago. No Paleogene sedimentary rocks have been found onshore. Yangbuk Group conglomerates and alluvial fan sediments gathered in small fault-bounded basins in the Miocene. During the last 2.5 million years of the Quaternary, Jeju and other offshore islands formed from volcanism.
