= Taebaek Coal Museum =

South Korean museum

- 태백석탄박물관
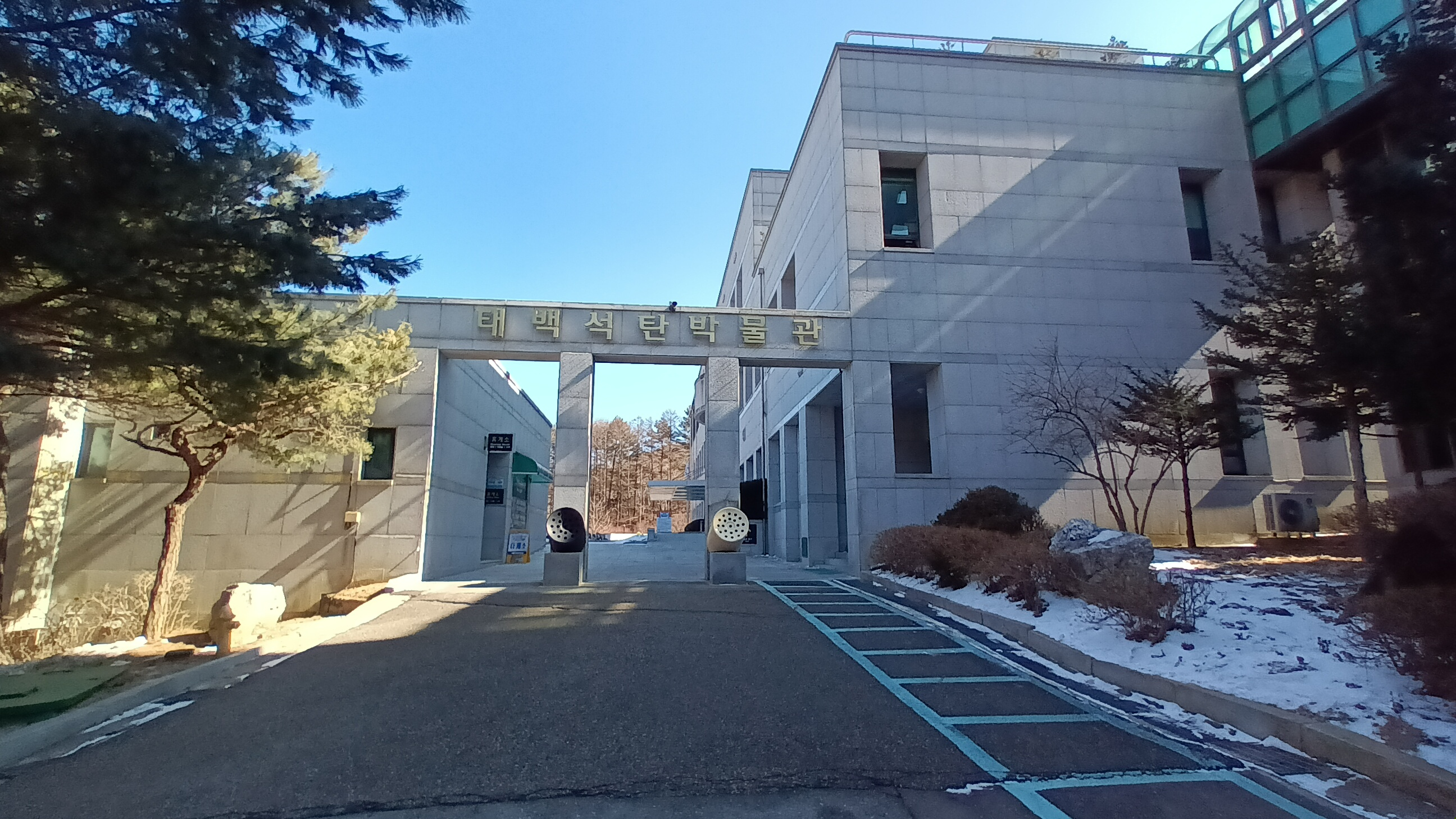
- Front entrance featuring stone sculptures of yeontan.
- Established: May 27, 1997
- Location: 195 Cheonjedan-gil, Taebaek-si, Gangwon Province, South Korea
- Coordinates: 37.117°N 128.950°E
- Website: https://www.taebaek.go.kr/coalmuseum/index.do

Taebaek Coal Museum (Korean: 태백석탄박물관) is a museum dedicated to the South Korean coal industry. It is located in Taebaek, Gangwon Province, South Korea.

== History ==
Coal powered much of South Korea's industrial development during the 1960s and 1970s, following the discovery of the country's first coal deposits in Taebaek city in 1930. As demand for coal declined in the 1980s, the city's economy dwindled as mines shut down and its population shrank.

The creation of the museum was part of an effort to revitalize the region. Basic plans for the museum were formed in 1989, and the blueprints were finalized in October 1933. The construction began in June 1994. The museum officially opened on 27 May 1997 as a Type 1 specialized museum (Registration No. 101). The museum originally had no entrance fee, but switched to paid entry on January 10, 2017. It has been absorbed by and operated by Taebaeksan Provincial Park Office (태백산도립공원사업) since 1998.

The museum has hosted multiple art exhibitions relating to coal. From July 2024 to August, an exhibition titled "The Physical Properties of Coal Dust and the Emotions of Highland Scenery" (석탄가루의 물성과 고원풍경의 감성), showcased 최법진's paintings which was drawn using only coal dust. In 2022, the museum held a coal mine photography contest and a gallery.

In 2021, the Ministry of Culture, Sports and Tourism handed the museum a 10,000,000 South Korean won grant to create audio guides, develop mission-based exhibits, and integrate technologies like augmented reality.

February 2025 saw a 38.5% increase in visitor count year-over-year, corresponding with the city seeing a 25% increase in tourists.

In May 2025, the museum announced plans to install a "slow mailbox", where letters are delivered one year after being sent, as part of a collaboration with local post offices and tourist destinations.

== Exhibits ==
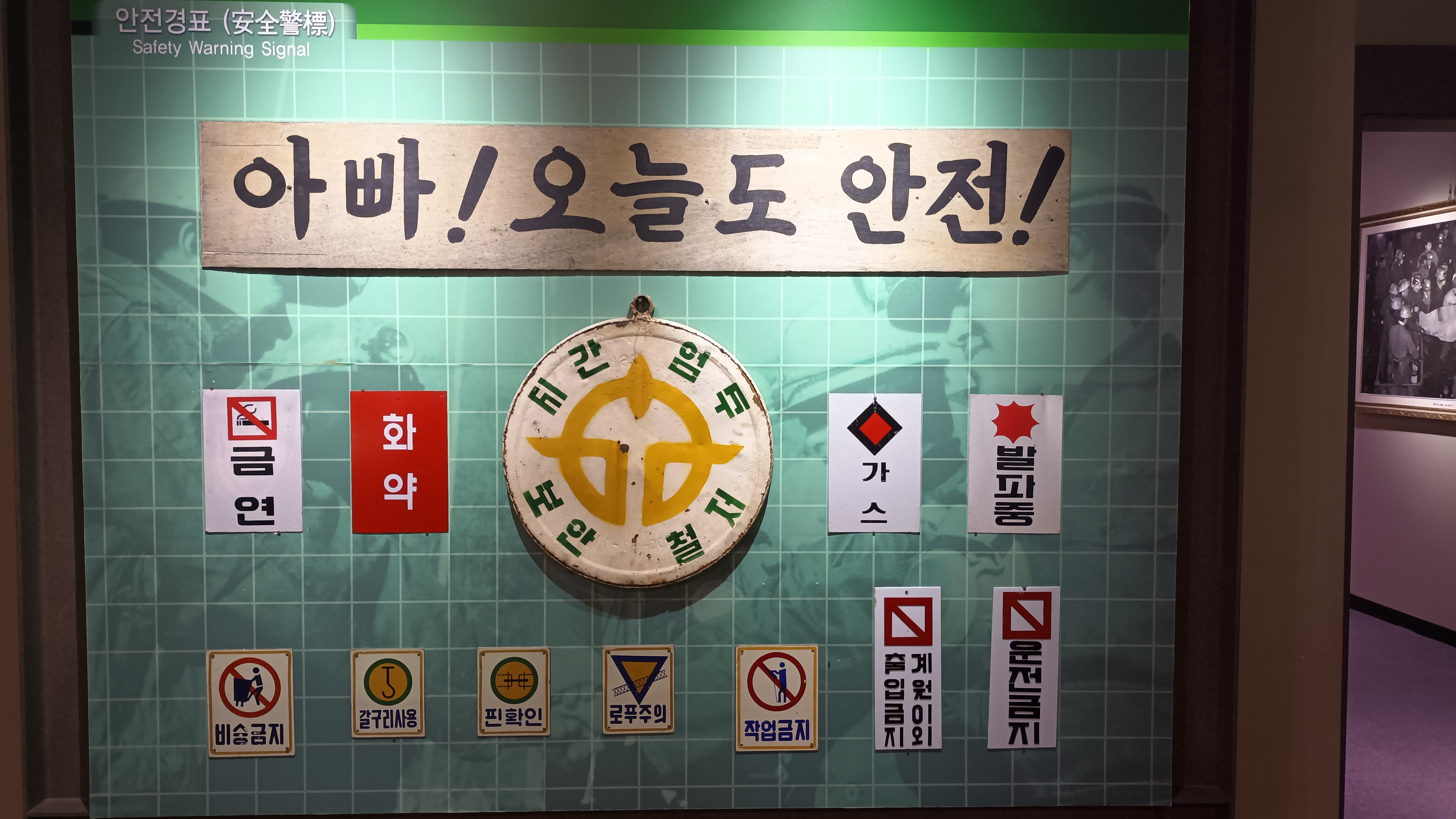
Safety signs used in coal mines

The museum occupies a site area of 23,811m^{2} (~7,203 pyeong), with an exhibition area of 11,576m^{2} (~3,502 pyeong). The museum has 3 aboveground floors, one basement floor, and a large outside section. The museum's eight exhibits contain historical documents, minerals, fossils, and mining equipment.

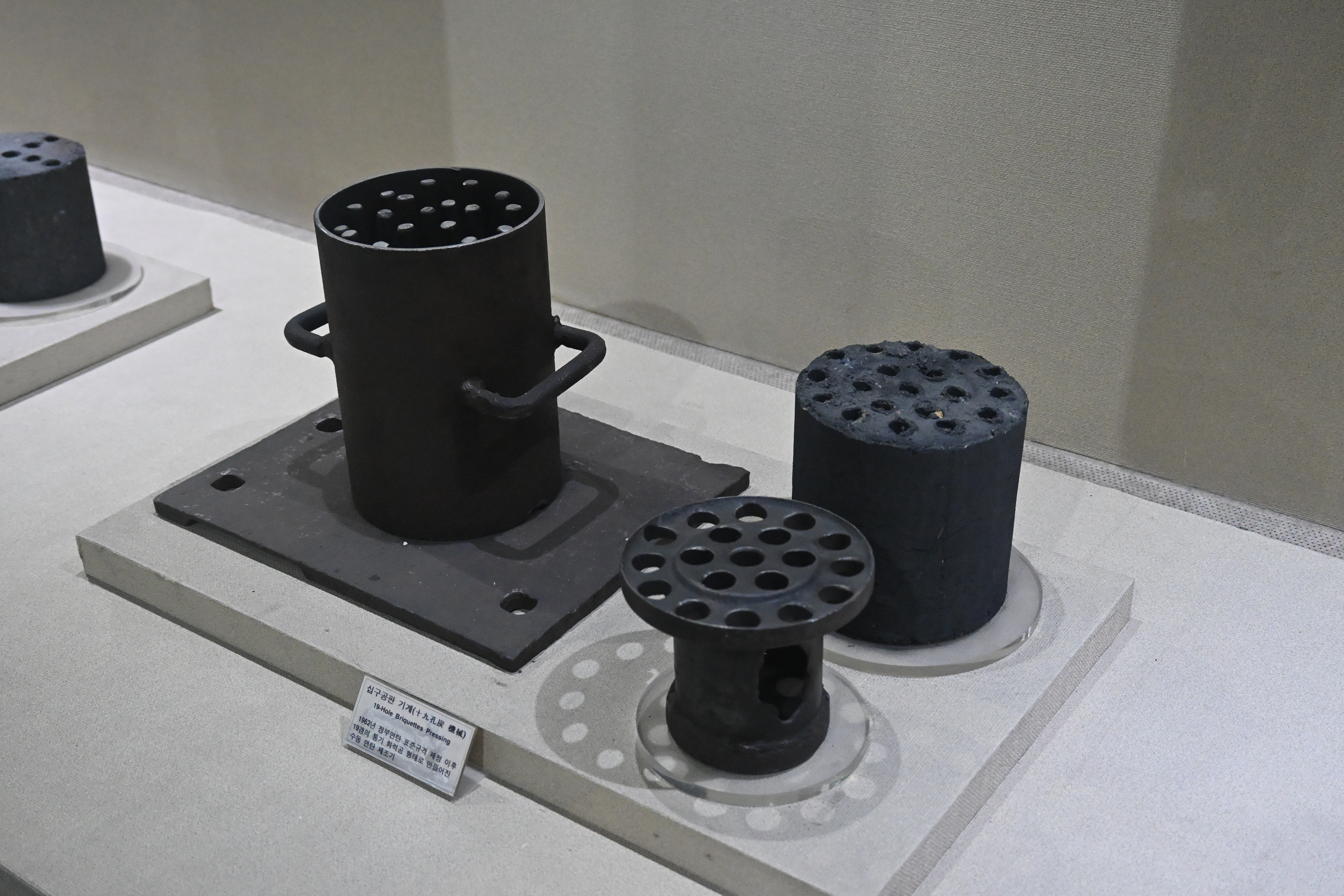
19-hole yeontan template and yeontan

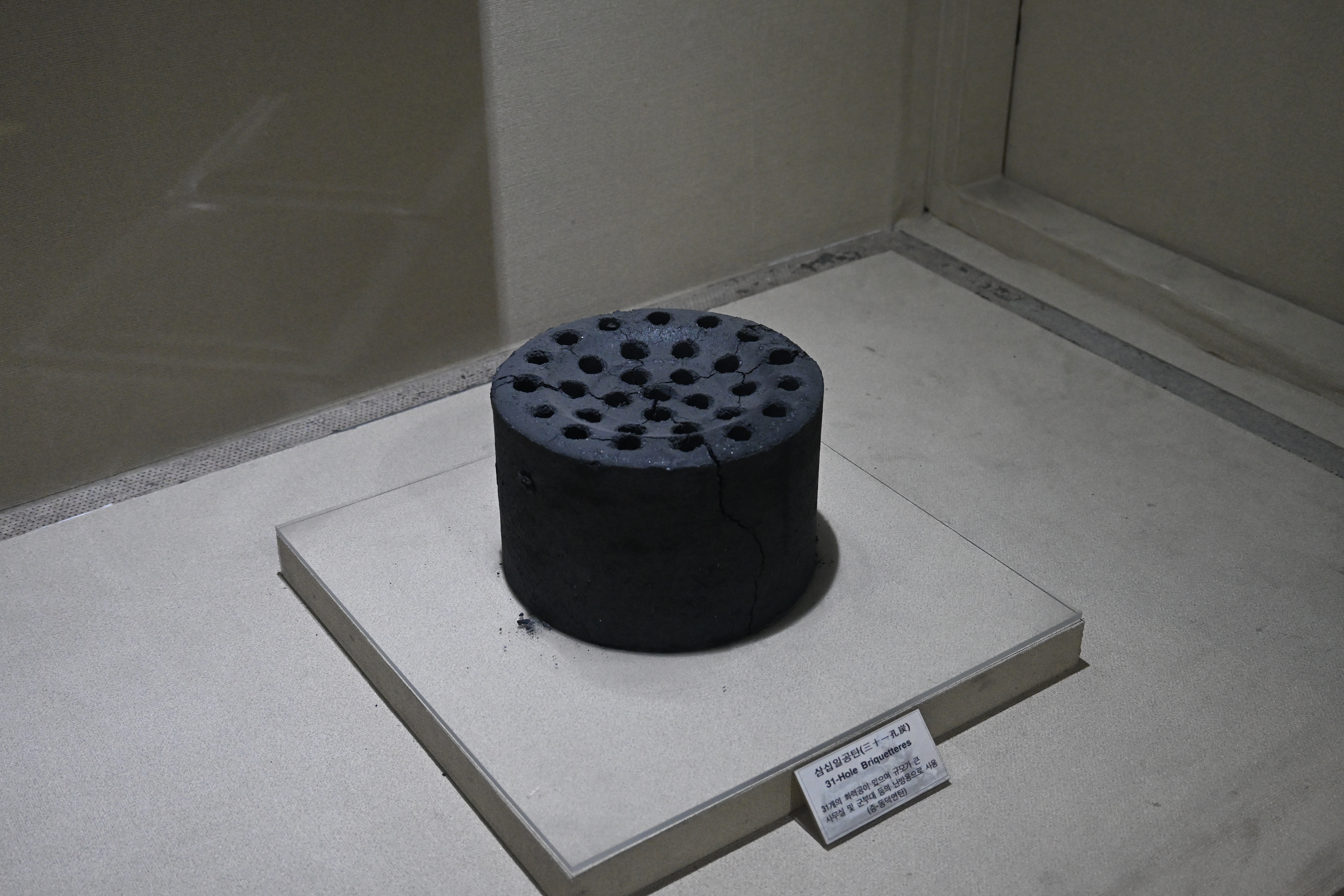
31-hole yeontan
