= 365 Safe Town =

Theme park in Taebaek, South Korea

Coordinates: 37.1005°N 129.0243°E

- Interactive map of 365 Safe Town
- Type: Safety experience
- Location: Jangseong-dong, Taebaek, Gangwon Province, South Korea
- Website: taebaek.go.kr/365safetown/index.do

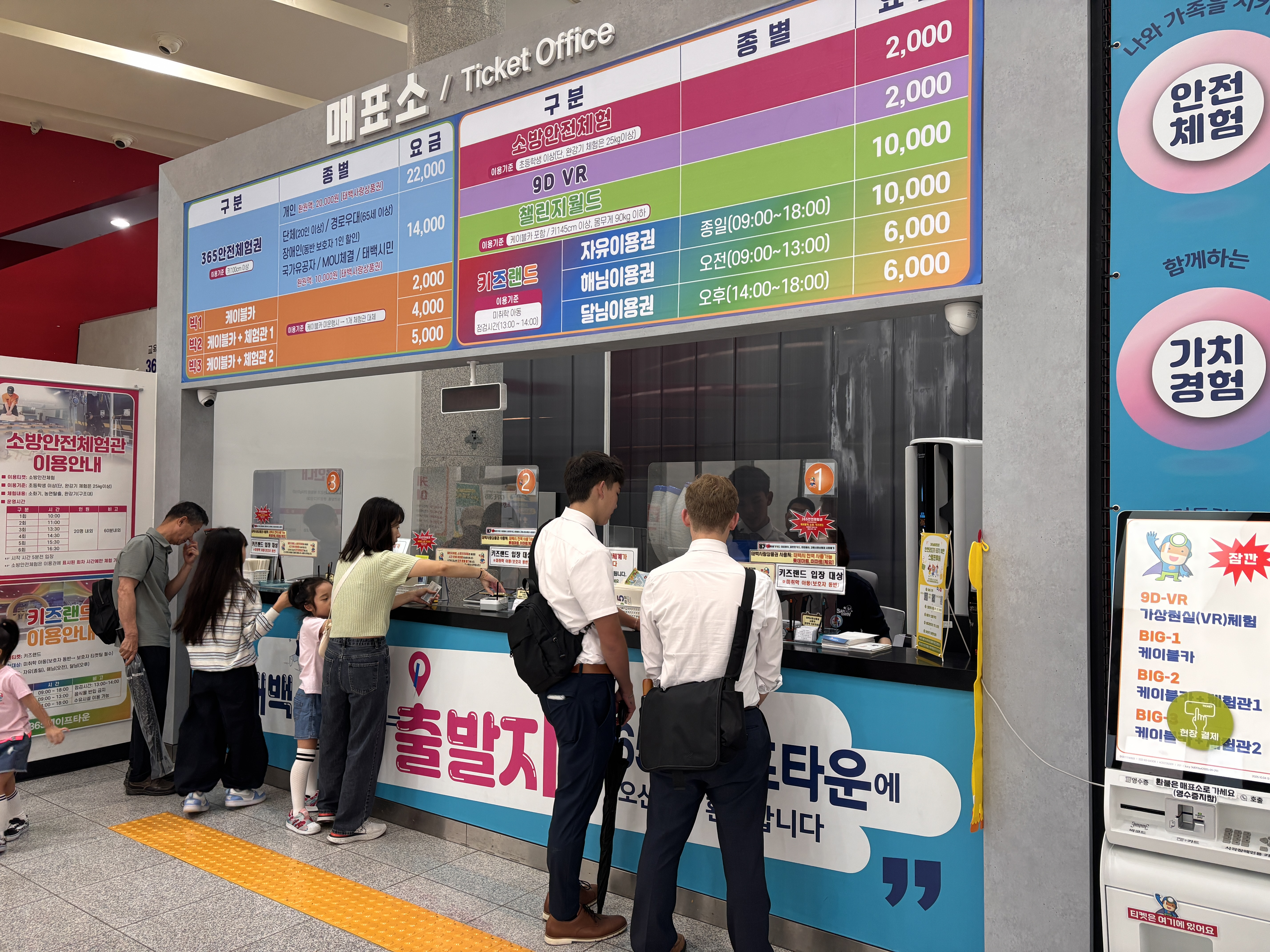
365 Safe Town ticket office, 2025

365 Safe Town (Korean: 365세이프타운) is a theme park in Taebaek, South Korea which promotes safety education. Established in 2012, the park has various edutainment facilities which simulates disasters like fire and floods, as well as teaching visitors safety techniques like CPR.

== Features ==
365 Safe Town has three main buildings: Fire Safety Experience Center, Comprehensive Safety Experience Center, and Challenge World.

365 Safe Town provides safety edutainment on variety of emergency situations. For one, the park offers 4D film simulations of earthquakes, wildfires, flooding, and terrorism. There are also facilities to try out cardiopulmonary resuscitation (CPR) and escape a plane. In the Fire Safety Experience building, visitors can practice fire safety techniques such as using an descending life line (완강기) or a fire extinguisher, and performing a CPR, with guidance from current fire school instructors.

The park hosts safety-themed summer camps for teenagers, ran by Gangwon Province Fire Department.

== History ==
The park opened in October 2012, becoming the largest safety education-themed park in South Korea, with an area of 938,579 m^{2}. By April 2014, the total visitor count neared 100,000. In 2015, 365 Safe Town was designated by the Ministry of Education as the first "Safety Experience Center" in South Korea. As such, safety training conducted here for students is recognized as fulfilling mandatory student safety education under the School Safety Act. Since 2020, 365 Safe Town has been reimbursing 20,000 won out of the 22,000 won admission fee in the form of Taebaek Love Gift Certificates (태백사랑상품권). In 2023, over 100,000 people have visited, and Gift Certificates worth 1.1 billion won have been reimbursed to customers.
