= Nakdong Formation =

Geologic formation in South Korea

- Stratigraphic range: Hauterivian-Aptian; ~127–118 Ma
- Type: Geological formation
- Unit of: Shindong Group
- Underlies: Hasandong Formation
- Overlies: Unconformity
- Thickness: ~2,100 meters

Lithology
- Primary: Conglomerate, Shale, sandstone

Location
- Coordinates: 35.6°N 128.2°E
- Approximate paleocoordinates: 41.1°N 133.8°E
- Region: Gyeongsang Province
- Country: South Korea

Type section
- Named for: Nakdong, Sangju
- Named by: Tateiwa, 1929
- Nakdong Formation (South Korea)

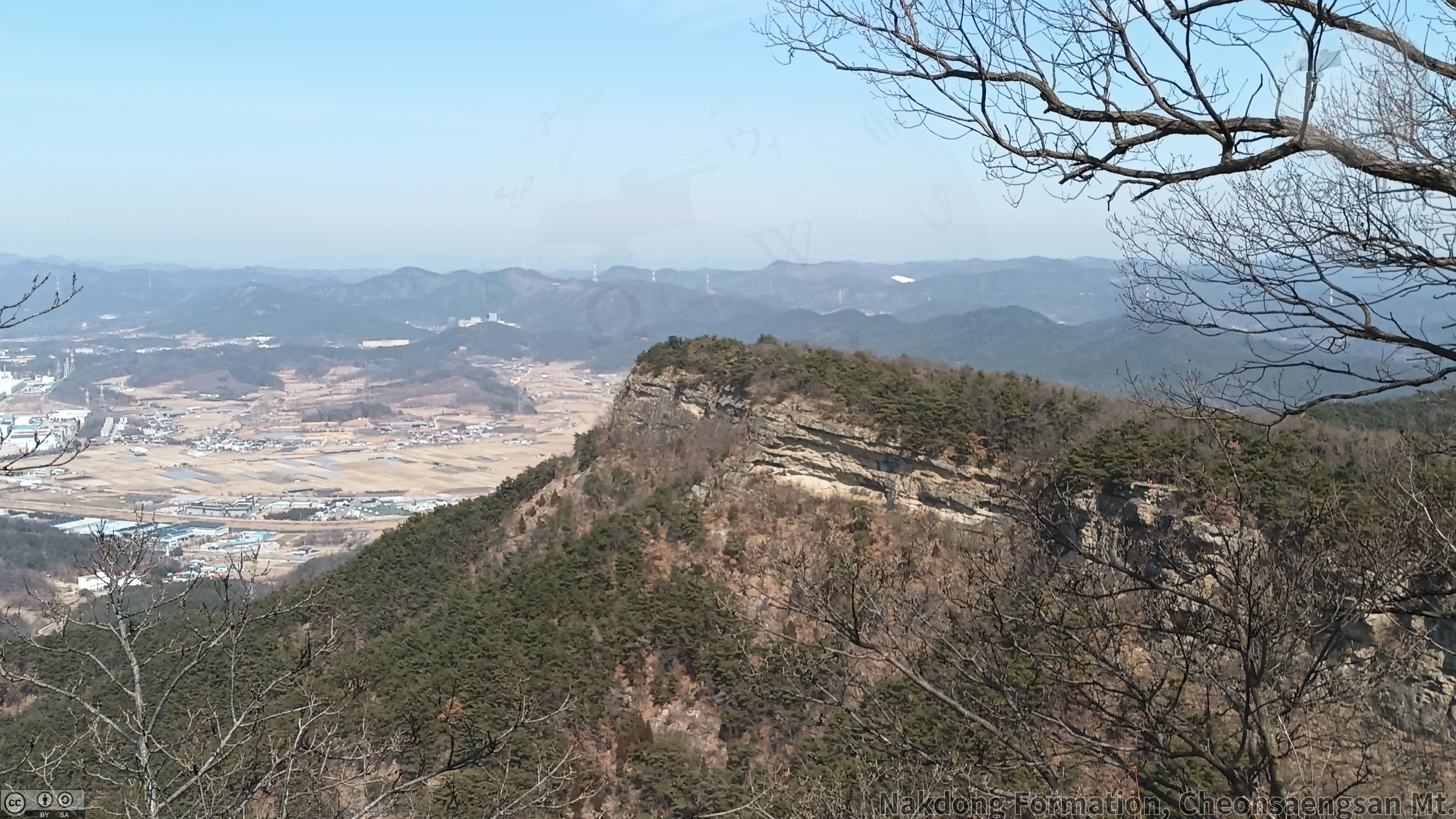
Nakdong Formation, Cheonsaengsan Mountain, Gumi City.

The Nakdong Formation (Also known as the Nagdong Formation) (Korean: 낙동층; Hanja: 洛東層; RR: Nakdong-cheung) is an Lower Cretaceous (Hauterivian to Aptian) geologic formation in South Korea. It has been dated from the Hauteravian to the Aptian, between 127 Ma and 118.0 ± 2.6 Ma. It is also the lowermost formation-level stratigraphic unit of the Gyeongsang Supergroup. Plant fossils from the Nakdong Formation overlap with the floral assemblage of the older Myogok Formation and show a 'mixed type' of the Tetori-Type and the Ryoseki-Type flora present in this formation. Based on bivalve fossil records, it correlates with molluscan faunas of the Japanese Kitadani Formation and Sebayashi Formation.

== Geology ==
The Nakdong Formation could be distinguished from the overlying Hasandong Formation by absence of red beds in the entire formation.

Based on facies shown in outcrops, the depositional setting of the formation has been changed from lower to upper: (A): Alluvial plain with tributaries, (B): Low sinuous channel system with bars, and (C): Sinuous channel system with splays and floodplains. The channel system of the upper Nakdong Formation is continuously extended to the Hasandong Formation.

Meanwhile, pond deposits are restricted in the formation, represented by dark gray shaly mudstone intervened between fluvial sandy deposits, showing a concave lower contact and planar upper contact, up to 2 meters thick. Ferns and bivalve fossils are occasionally from these sediments. Based on these characteristics, pond deposits of the Nakdong Formation represent small-sized channels or small ponds deposited over the floodplains. No evaporites or stromatolites have been recorded there.

== Fossil content ==
Color key: Taxon / Reclassified taxon / Taxon falsely reported as present / Dubious taxon or junior synonym / Ichnotaxon / Ootaxon / Morphotaxon

Notes
Uncertain or tentative taxa are in small text
~~crossed out~~ taxa are discredited.

=== Plants ===
Based on Kimura (2000).

==== Bryophyta ====
Bryophytes of the Nakdong Formation
Genus	Species	Location	Stratigraphic position	Material	Notes	Images
Thallites	T. yabei				Liverwort	

==== Polypodiopsida ====
Ferns of the Nakdong Formation
Genus	Species	Location	Stratigraphic position	Material	Notes	Images
Equisetites	E. naktongensis					
Equisetites	E. naktongensis var. tenuicaulis					
Equisetites	E. ushimuraensis					
Asterotheca	A. naktongensis				Marattiaceae fern	
Naktongia	N. yabei				Schizaeaceae fern	
Gleichenites	G. nipponensis				Gleicheniaceae fern	
Cyathocaulis	C. naktongensis				Cyatheaceae fern	
Ciboticaulis	C. tateiwai				Cyatheaceae fern	
?Hausmannia	?H. sp.					
Onychiopsis	O. elongata				Dicksoniaceae fern	
Adiantopteris	A. sewardi					
Ruffordia	R. goepperti					
Cladophlebis	C. denticulata					
Cladophlebis	C. exiliformes					
Cladophlebis	C. shinshuensis					
Klukia	K. koraiensis					

==== Bennettitales ====
Bennettitales of the Nakdong Formation
Genus	Species	Location	Stratigraphic position	Material	Notes	Images
Dictyozamites	D. falcatus					
Dictyozamites	D. kawasakii					
Dictyozamites	D. tateiwae					
?Pseudocycas	?P. sp.					

==== Nilssoniales ====
Nilssoniales of the Nakdong Formation
Genus	Species	Location	Stratigraphic position	Material	Notes	Images
Nilssonia	N. kotoi					
Nilssonia	N. orientalis					
Nilssonia	N. schaumburgensis					
Nilssonia	N. serrulata					
Nilssonia	N. wakwanensis					
Nilssonia	N. yabei					

==== Ginkgoales ====
Ginkgoales of the Nakdong Formation
Genus	Species	Location	Stratigraphic position	Material	Notes	Images
Ginkgoidium	G. gracile					
Ginkgoidium	G. nathorsti					

==== Conifers ====
Conifers of the Nakdong Formation
Genus	Species	Location	Stratigraphic position	Material	Notes	Images
Frenelopsis	F. parceramosa					
Brachyphyllum	B. japonicum					
Podozamites	P. lanceolatus					
Podozamites	P. reinii					
Sphenolepidium	S. sternbergianum					

==== Indeterminate plants ====
Indeterminate group of plants of the Nakdong Formation
Genus	Species	Location	Stratigraphic position	Material	Notes	Images
Taeniopteris	T. inouei					
Taeniopteris	T. sp. cf. T. auriculata					

=== Molluscs ===
Molluscs of the Nakdong Formation
Genus	Species	Location	Stratigraphic position	Material	Notes	Images
Nagdongia	N. soni				Also known from the Kitadani Formation and overlying Hasandong Formation	
Pseudohyria	P. matsumotoi				Also known from the Kitadani Formation and the Sengoku Formation	
Nippononaia	N. ryosekiana				Also known from the Kitadani Formation and the Sebayashi Formation	
Trigonioides	T. bongkyuni					
Trigonioides	T. wakinoensis					
Sphaerium	S. coreanicum					
Viviparus	V. keishoensis					

=== Vertebrates ===
Vertebrates of the Nakdong Formation
Genus	Species	Location	Stratigraphic position	Material	Notes	Images
Sauropoda	Indeterminate			Partial cervical vertebra and ribs		

== See also ==
- List of dinosaur-bearing rock formations
  - List of stratigraphic units with indeterminate dinosaur fossils
