= Baekbyeongsan =

Mountain in Taebaek, South Korea

Highest point
- Elevation: 1,259.3 m (4,132 ft)
- Listing: Mountains of Korea
- Coordinates: 37°09′30″N 129°04′05″E

Geography
- Country: South Korea

Korean name
- Hangul: 백병산
- Hanja: 白屛山
- RR: Baekbyeongsan
- MR: Paekpyŏngsan

Baekbyeongsan (Korean: 백병산) is a hill in Taebaek, Gangwon Province, South Korea. It has an elevation of 1,259.3 m (4,132 ft).
