= Geology of North Korea =

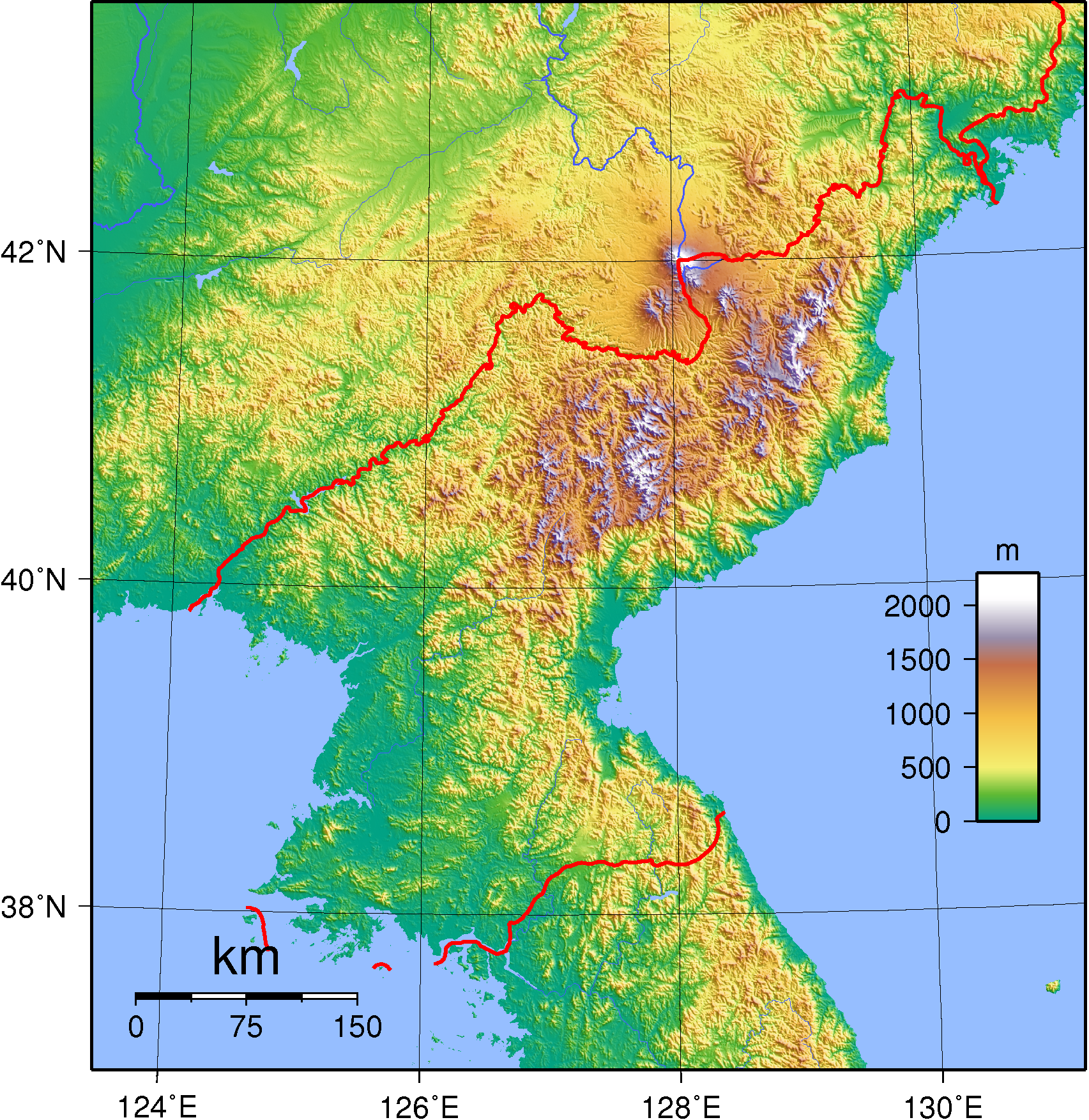
Topography of North Korea

The geology of North Korea has been studied by the Central Geological Survey of Mineral Resources, rare international research, and by inference from South Korea's geology.

The oldest rocks are Precambrian in age, with basement gneisses and metamorphic supergroups dating back over two billion years. These are overlain by Paleozoic sedimentary sequences, including limestone, siltstone and coal-bearing formations deposited in shallow marine and continental rift environments. During the Mesozoic, the region experienced multiple orogenic events and significant plutonic intrusion. Cenozoic geology is characterized by limited sedimentary preservation due to regional uplift and erosion, with notable volcanic activity along the North Korea–China border.

== Precambrian ==
Some international dating work around 1973 indicated that most basement rock in North Korea dates to the Proterozoic or the earlier Archean. The North Kyangsong Province gneiss samples indicated ages to 2.12 billion years ago and in 1985, the Sangni Metamorphic Supergroup and the Sangni Revolution were proposed as names for the gneiss-schist and gneiss formation. These groupings have been used to make sense of the 2.1 billion year old Punchon Granitic Gneiss, the Wonnan Group and the P'yonghae Group.

The Machyollong Metamorphic Supergroup is particularly widespread in the northeast, overlying older basement rock near the Yalu River. The supergroup is up to 10 kilometers thick with magnesite-bearing marble, mica schist and quartzite (quartzite units increase in thickness to the west). The western edge of the Machyollong Zone is known as the Iwon Mobile Belt and contains extrusive and intrusive igneous rocks.

The late Proterozoic Sangwon Synthem is widespread in the Pyongnam Basin and other, smaller basins in North Korea and experienced deformation during orogenies in the Mesozoic.

== Paleozoic ==
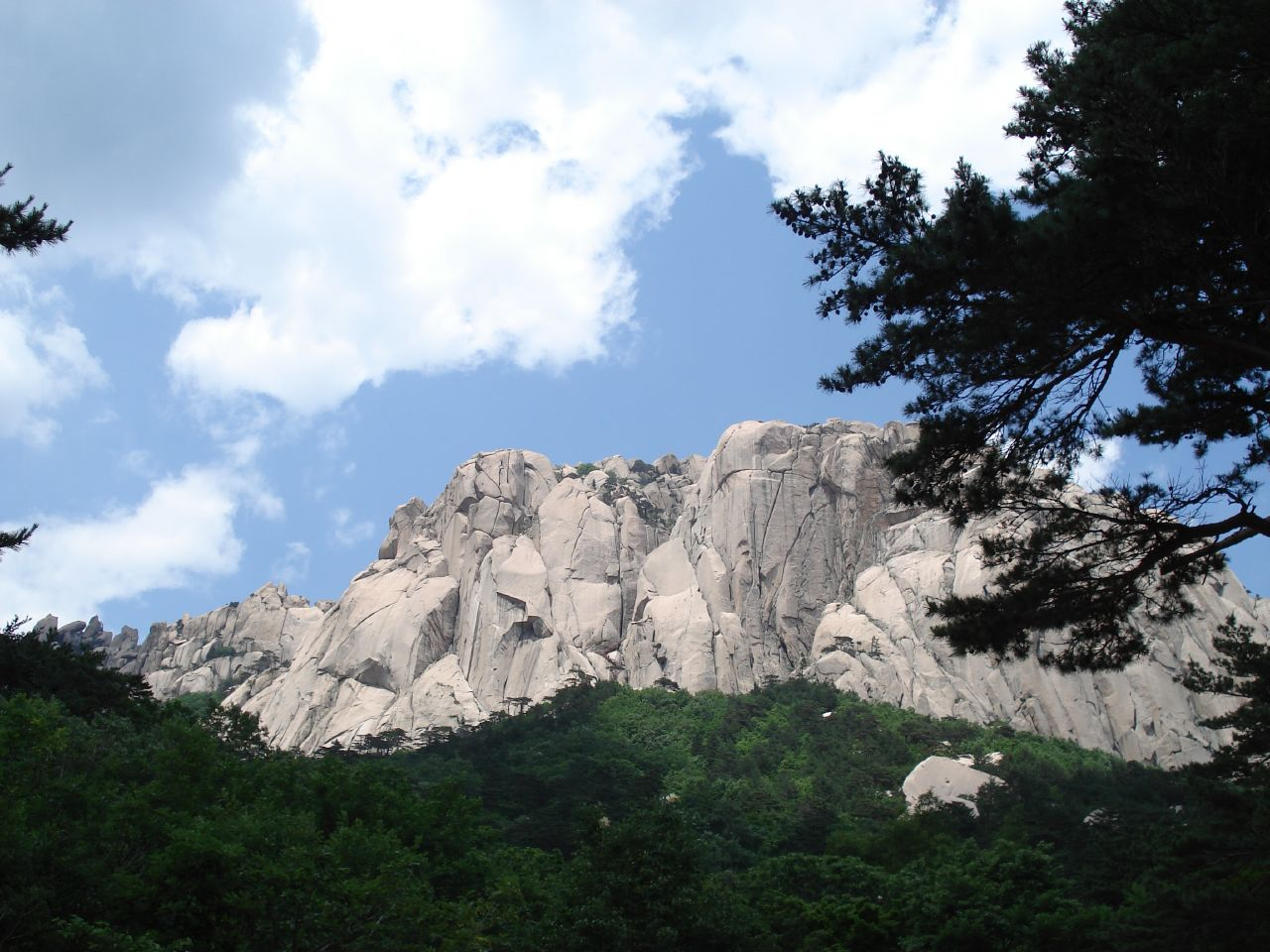
A view of Mount Seorak

The Late Ordovician Miru Series was identified beginning in 1971 as the Koksan Series and subsequently renamed after 1975. The 170 meter thick limestone and siltstone centered around the P'yongnam Basin has extensive crinoid, coral and gastropod fossils. Paleogeography researchers have suggested that corals formed in the Miru Sea—a branch of the South Yangtze Sea. The discovery of Ordovician fossils meant that the previous Koksan Series was revised to be younger, encompassing Silurian slate, limestone and siltstone in the Singye-Koksan area up to 280 meters thick. It includes trilobite and Rugosa fossils.

For years, geologists in the Korean Peninsula were puzzled about the early Paleozoic fossils found in the early Mesozoic Taedong Synthem (limestone pebbles in the Kyomipo Conglomerate). However, in 1991, Kang and Pak inferred an origin from the Koksan Series. Marine fossils are also widespread in the Imjin Group, first recognized in 1962 in the Kaesong-Kumchon-Cholwon area. The three kilometer thick unit is subdivided into the Anhyop, Puapsan and Saknyong Series and is widespread throughout the Imjinang Fold Belt in central North Korea. The Anhyop Series represents one kilometer of schist, limestone, phyllite and sandstone. The 1.1 kilometer Puapsan Series and one kilometer Saknyong Series are both very similar, although the Saknyong also has siltstone and volcanic rocks. North Korean geologists have identified the Imjin Group as a continental rift basin, correlated with similar rocks on the Shandong Peninsula across the Yellow Sea in China. Many of the rocks have experienced low-grade metamorphism and volcanic sequences are comparatively thick.

At the base of the Taedong Synthem is the P'yong'an Supergroup, which lies disconformably atop older Paleozoic rocks. In the Pyongyang Coalfield it is divided into the 650 meter sandstone, shale and conglomerate of the Nogam Formation, the 500 meter Kobangsan Formation, 350 meter coal-bearing Sadong Formation and 250 meter chert-bearing Hongjom Formation, all typically assigned to an Upper Permian shallow marine environment.

== Mesozoic ==
During the Mesozoic, the region experienced the Songnim Orogeny, named for overturned, overthrusted Choson and P'yong'an synthem rocks near Songnim, north of Pyongyang. This event is associated with the 240 to 190 million year old Triassic and Jurassic Hyesan Complex pluton.

Taebo, a place north of Pyongyang is the namesake of the Taebo orogeny, a period of tectonic activity that emplaced the Taebo Granite around 180 million years ago. The orogeny, which is evidenced in the Okchon Supergroup, is likely related to the separation of Japan from Asia.

North of Pyongyang, Precambrian basement rocks are unconformably overlain by a Jurassic limestone conglomerate ascending to layers of siltstone and mudstone. The Upper Jurassic Shinuiju Formation northwest of Shinuiju has sandstone, conglomerate and mudstone up to two kilometers thick. Offshore drilling in the West Korea Bay Basin indicates these rocks are the onshore extension of offshore units. It is subdivided into fluvial rocks and Upper Jurassic black shale, limestone, conglomerate and sandstone formed in a lake environment.

== Cenozoic ==
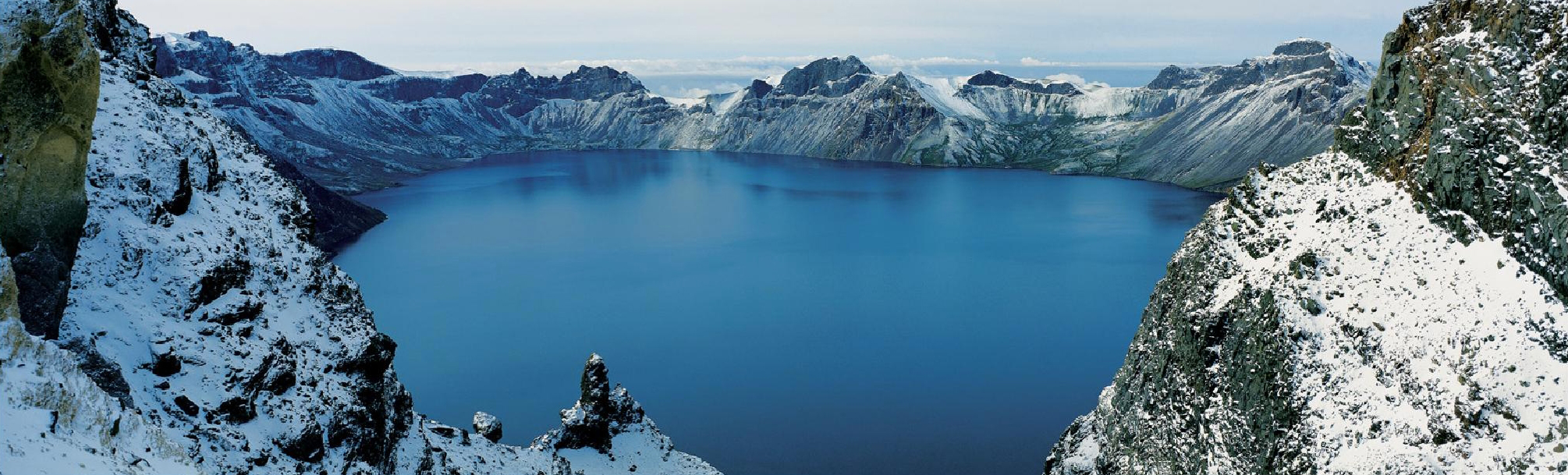
Heaven Lake, a volcanic crater lake at Changbai on the North Korea–China border

Earthquake map of Korea 2000–2017

Longstanding terrestrial conditions prevailed through much of the Cenozoic, until the recent geological past, when a marine regression flooded the area around the peninsula. Very few Cenozoic sediments are known from either Korea, likely as a result of erosion due to uplift of the peninsula. Submarine normal faults along the eastern coastline may have driven crustal tilting. The 350 meter thick Bongsan Coalfield in Hwanghae Province on the west coast preserves sedimentary and coal-bearing layers dating to the Eocene. Further to the north, in the West Korea Bay Basin Eocene and Oligocene sedimentary rocks up to three kilometers thick unconformably overlie Mesozoic rocks, formed in lakes and coal swamps during the Paleogene.

== See also ==
- Amurian Plate
- Geography of North Korea
- Geology of South Korea
- 946 eruption of Paektu Mountain
- Mining in North Korea

== Sources ==
- Chough, Sung Kwun (2012-12-31). Geology and Sedimentology of the Korean Peninsula. Newnes. ISBN 9780124055124.
- Moores, E.M.; Fairbridge, Rhodes W. (1997). Encyclopedia of European & Asian Regional Geology. Springer. pp. 465–475.
- Ri, Juk Nam; Ri, Jong Chol (1994). Explanatory text for tectonic map of Korea 1:1,000,000 Scale. Pyongyang: Ministry of Natural Resources Development. pp. 1–22.
- Ri, Juk Nam; Ryu, Jong Rak (1994). Explanatory text for geological map of Korea 1:1,000,000 Scale. Pyongyang: Ministry of Natural Resources Development. pp. 1–39.
