= Hambaeksan =

Mountain in Gangwon Province, South Korea

Highest point
- Elevation: 1,573 m (5,161 ft)
- Coordinates: 37°09′42″N 128°55′03″E

Geography
- Location: South Korea

Korean name
- Hangul: 함백산
- Hanja: 咸白山
- RR: Hambaeksan
- MR: Hambaeksan

Hambaeksan (Korean: 함백산) is a mountain between Jeongseon County and Taebaek, Gangwon Province, South Korea. It has an elevation of 1,573 m (5,161 ft).

== See also ==
- List of mountains in Korea
