= Myogok Formation =

Geologic formation in South Korea

- Stratigraphic range: Berriasian; ~138.6 Ma
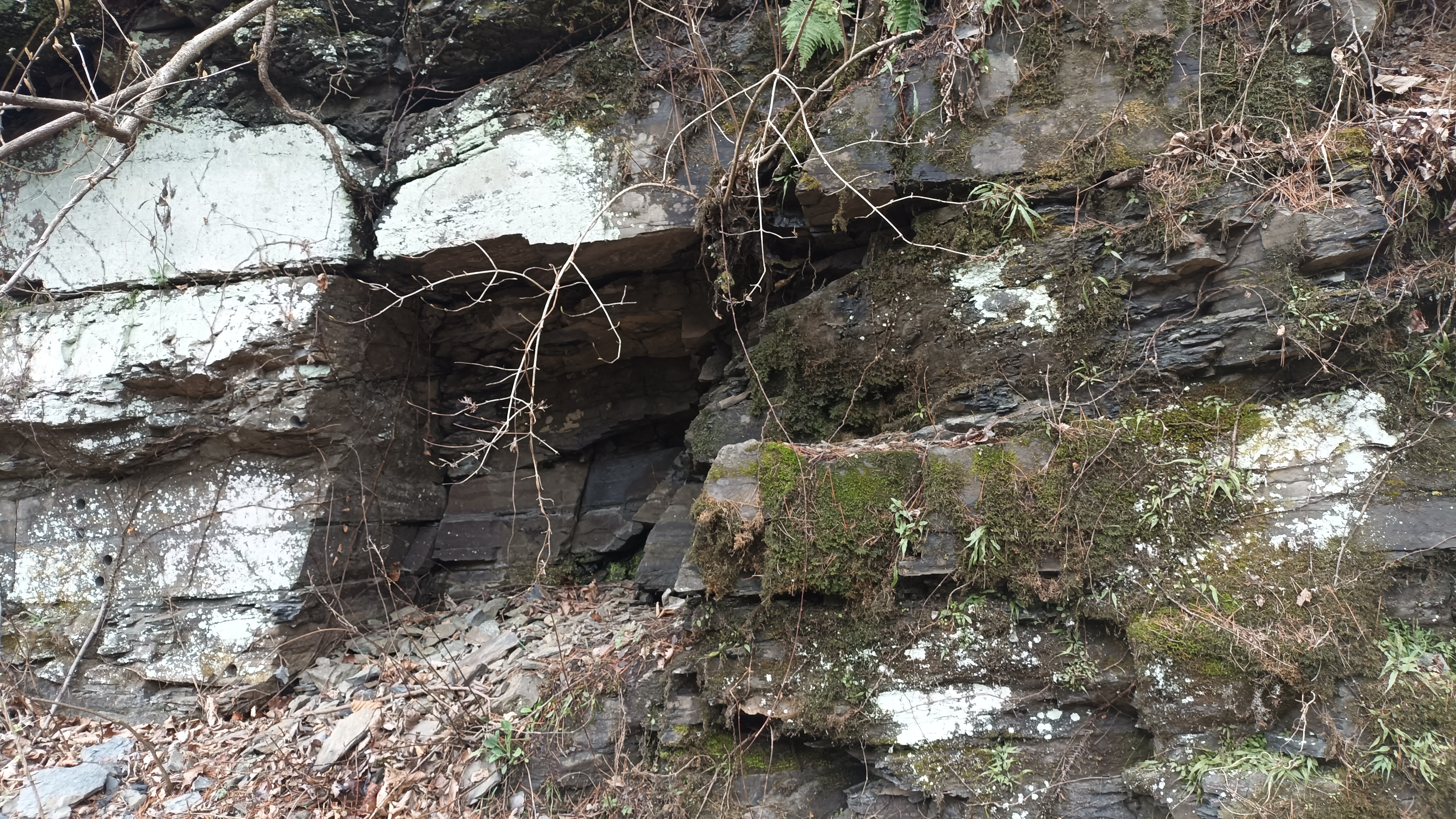
- Outcrop of the Myogok Formation
- Type: Geological formation
- Underlies: Ullyeonsan Formation
- Overlies: Wonnam Formation
- Thickness: Unknown

Lithology
- Primary: Shale, mudstone and sandstone

Location
- Coordinates: 36.50°N 128.58°E
- Region: North Gyeongsang Province
- Country: South Korea

Type section
- Named for: Myogok, Bonghwa
- Named by: Lee and Lee, 1963
- Myogok Formation (South Korea)

The Myogok Formation(Myogog Formation in older literatures)(Korean: 묘곡층; Hanja: 卯谷層) is a Lower Cretaceous geologic formation in South Korea. Myogok Formation is chronologically intermediate between Upper Triassic-Middle Jurassic Daedong Supergroup and the Lower Cretaceous Hauterivian-Upper Cretaceous Gyeongsang Supergroup.

== Geology ==
The Myogok Formation is locally distributed at the Yeongyang Subbasin of the Gyeongsang Basin, and is contiguous to the boundary of the Yeongnam Massif. The lithology of the Myogok Formation is mainly consists dark gray to black shale and mudstone, and subordinately of light to dark grey siltstone and sandstone. In the shale deposited in the lower part of the formation, two or three thin coal beds are present.

Regarding the interpretation of the paleoenvironment of the Myogok Formation, multiple suggestions are present. Chun et al. (1991) suggested the Myogok Formation was deposited at the point-bar of the meandering river system, whereas Kong et al. (2020) suggested paleoienviornment of the Myogok Formation was lacustrine setting. This is caused by poor outcrop continuity and severe deformation of the formation, which makes it hard to draw multiple correlatable columnar sections.

== Age ==
Myogok Formation was initially suggested as Upper Jurassic based on plant and mollusc fossils. While it is definite that the Myogok Formation was deposited later than the Daedong Supergroup based on plant fossils, segregation with the Gyeongsang Supergroup was uncertain based on plant fossils, due to most of taxa except Podozamites sp. are overlapping with the Nagdong Formation. Chang and Yang (1970) suggested that the depositional age of the Myogok Formation might be similar to the lower part of the Gyeongsang supergroup, but taxa presented in the research are not suitable for comparison due to wide range from Late Jurassic to Early Cretaceous. Whereas, bivalve fossils took an important role to show chronological gap was present with the Nagdong Formation, by showing distinct species not found in entire Gyeongsang Supergroup.

Since 1990s, researches based on palynofossils, molluscan fossils and the detrital zircon U-PB ages show the depositional age of the Myogok Formation dates back to the Early Cretaceous, especially Berriasian(138.6±2.1Ma).

== Fossil Records ==
=== Molluscs ===
Molluscan fauna of the Myogok Formation could be related to Japanese assemblages, including fossil records from the Tatsukawa Formation, Izuki Formation, Okurodani Formation and the Kuwajima Formation, based on similarities of the Korean Viviparus cf. ongoensis and the Japanese V. ongoensis. But precise comparisons between Korean and Japanese fossils are difficult since the former is much better preserved than the latter.

Molluscs of the Myogok Formation
Genus	Species	Location	Stratigraphic position	Material	Notes	Images
Koreania	K. cheongi					
Nagdongia	N. leei					
Cuneopsis	C. kihongi					
Viviparus	V. cf. ongoensis					

=== Plants ===
Plants of the Myogok Formation
Genus	Species	Location	Stratigraphic position	Material	Notes	Images
Onychiopsis	O. elongata					
Cladophlebis	C. tenue					
Cladophlebis	C. falcata					
Cladophlebis	C. argutula					
Cladophlebis	C. haibumensis					
Cladophlebis	C. sp. cf. C. undulata					
Cladophlebis	C. raciborskii					
Cladophlebis	C. acutipennis					
Cladophlebis	C. sp.					
Ruffordia	R. sp.					
Coniopteris	C. sp.					
Nilssonia	N. sp.					
Equisetites	E. sp.					
Neocalamites	N. sp.					
Dictyozamites	D. sp.					
Otozamites	O. sp.					
Zamites	Z. sp.					
Schizolepis	S. sp.					
Podozamites	P. distans					
