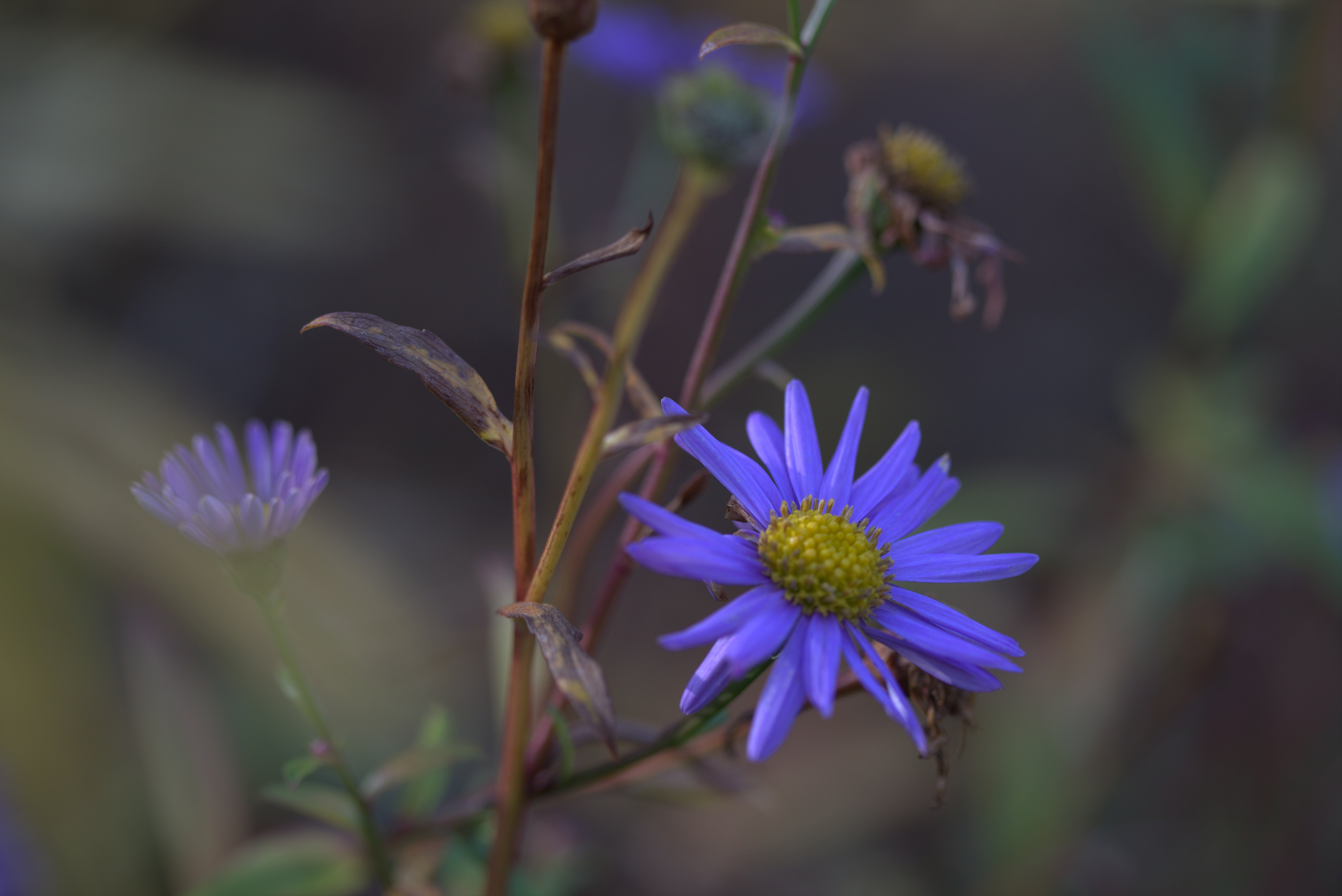
- Miyamayomena koraiensis

Scientific classification
- Kingdom: Plantae
- Clade: Embryophytes
- Clade: Tracheophytes
- Clade: Angiosperms
- Clade: Eudicots
- Clade: Asterids
- Order: Asterales
- Family: Asteraceae
- Subfamily: Asteroideae
- Tribe: Astereae
- Subtribe: Asterinae
- Genus: Miyamayomena; Kitam.

Synonyms
- Kitamuraster Soják; Kitamuraea Rauschert; Gymnaster Kitam. 1982, illegitimate homonym, not Schuette 1891 (a dinoflagellate)

= Miyamayomena =

Genus of flowering plants

Miyamayomena is a genus of East Asian flowering plants in the tribe Astereae within the family Asteraceae.

Species

- Miyamayomena angustifolia (Hand.-Mazz.) Y.L.Chen
- Miyamayomena koraiensis (Nakai) Kitam. - Korea
- Miyamayomena piccolii (Hook.f.) Kitam. - China
- Miyamayomena savatieri (Makino) Kitam. - Japan
- Miyamayomena simplex (Hand.-Mazz.) Y.L.Chen - Sichuan
- Miyamayomena yuanqunensis (J.Q.Fu) J.Q.Fu - Shanxi
