= Taebaek station =

Railway station in South Korea

태백
Taebaek
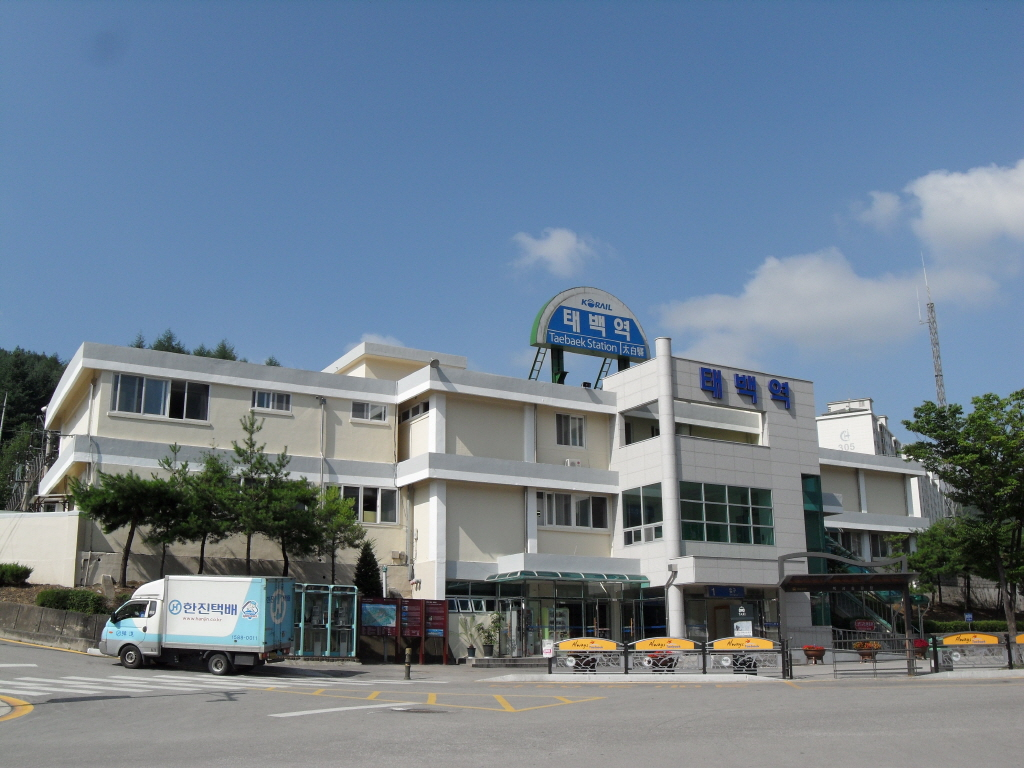

Korean name
- Hangul: 태백역
- Hanja: 太白驛
- Revised Romanization: Taebaengnyeok
- McCune–Reischauer: T'aebaengnyŏk

General information
- Location: Hwangji-dong, Taebaek, Gangwon; South Korea
- Coordinates: 37°10′33.63″N 128°59′1.86″E
- Operator: Korail
- Line: Taebaek Line

Construction
- Structure type: Aboveground

History
- Opened: December 10, 1962
Location

Taebaek station is a railway station in the city of Taebaek. It is on the Taebaek Line.
