= Gumunso =

Swamp in Gangwon, South Korea

Coordinates: 37.0930°N 129.0422°E

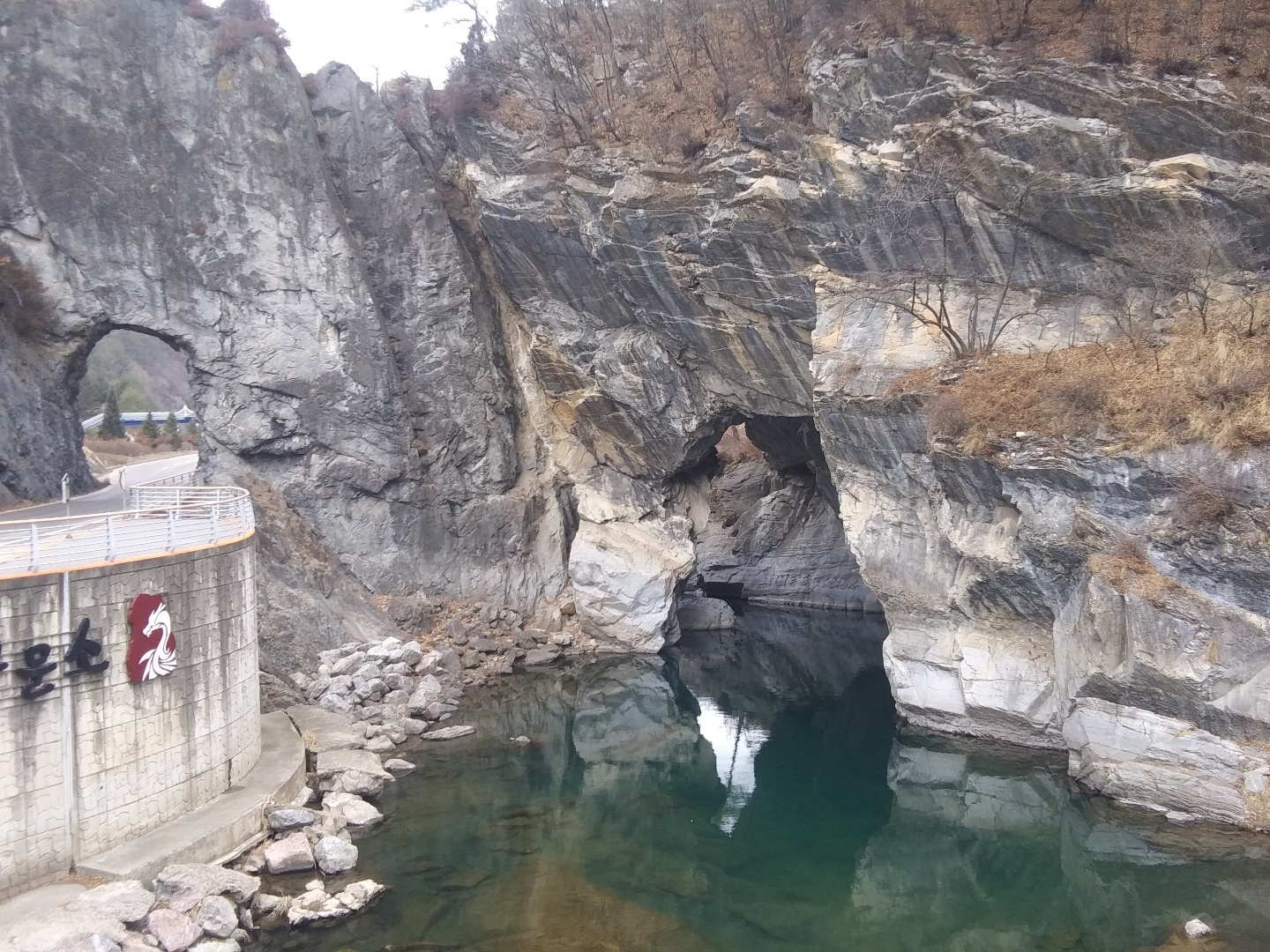
Two tunnels of Gumunso: one artificially dug, the other naturally eroded

Gumunso (Korean: 구문소; Hanja: 求門沼) is a swamp in Dongjeom-dong, Taebaek, Gangwon Province, South Korea. It features a rare formation in which a river flows beneath a mountain through a naturally eroded opening. The village and neighborhood (dong) surrounding Gumunso is named after the swamp. The two streams Cheoramcheon (철암천) and Hwangjicheon (황지천) meet in Gumunso to, depending on one's definition, begin the Nakdong River.

It is known for its geological value, as its stratigraphic (rock layer) continuity is well-preserved. The "Ordovician Deposits and Topography of Stream Erosion of Gumunso" is a part of Gangwon Paleozoic National Geopark and is the 417th Natural Monument of South Korea. In Gumunso, the Jigunsan and Makgol Formation (with the former unconformably overlying the latter) from the Lower Paleozoic Ordovician period (~440 to 500 million years ago) can be found.

== Name ==
The name Gumunso came from rewriting Gumuso (구무소; 구무沼; lit. 'hole swamp') into Hanja, changing '구무' (native Korean term for hole) into phonetically similar '求門' (구문). A purely native-Korean name is Tturunae (뚜루내). Veritable Records of Sejong and Daedongyeojido record the name as Cheoncheon (천천; 穿川; lit. 'pierced stream'). The hole itself is called Jagaemun (자개문; 子開門).

== Formation and history ==
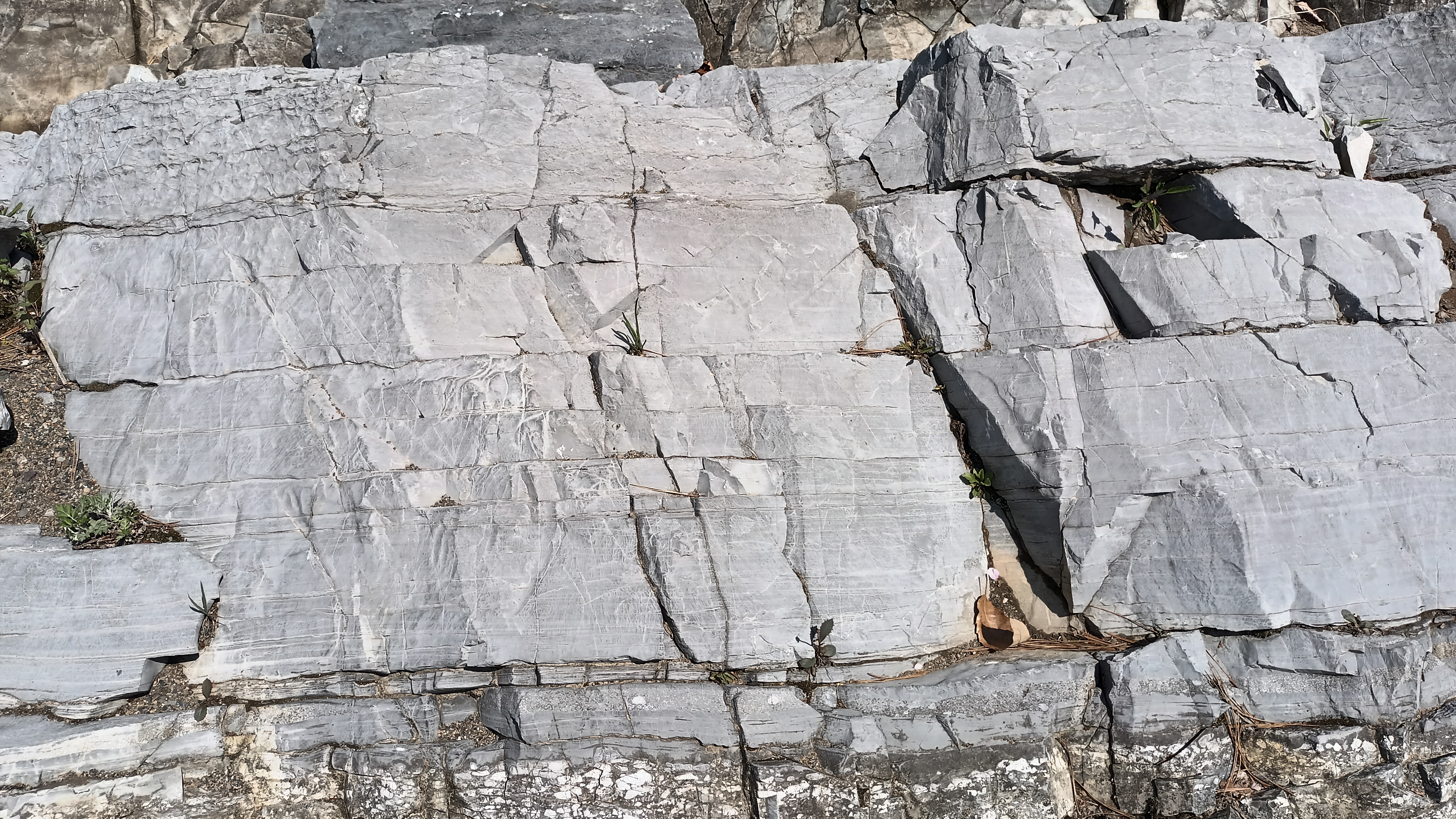
An outcrop in Gumunso

=== Formation ===
During the Ordovician era, the Taebaek region was underseas, with organisms like coral depositing limestone that would form today's Gumunso. When the sea became isolated from the rest of the ocean, it dried up, becoming extremely salty in the process. Rectangular imprints left by salt crystals can be found today in Gumunso.

Additionally, around Gumunso, sedimentary rocks can be found which were deposited during the Paleozoic Era, approximately 520 to 460 million years ago. Features like trilobite fossils and stromatolites can be seen. Further upstream is the Jigunsan Formation, which contains abundant fossils. In 2000, calathid fossils were discovered in the Gumunso-adjacent Makgol Formation, the first to be found in the Korean peninsula.

The hole was formed as a result of erosion. Around 30,000–70,000 years ago, the stream formed an Ω-shaped meander, sharply turning right at Gumunso instead of passing through it. Eventually, the erosion carved a small channel through the limestone, reducing the flow to the meander. Ten thousand years later, the hole was fully formed, and the weakened meander dried up. Today, the land where the meander used to be consists of farmlands, forming a region called sagundari (사군다리).

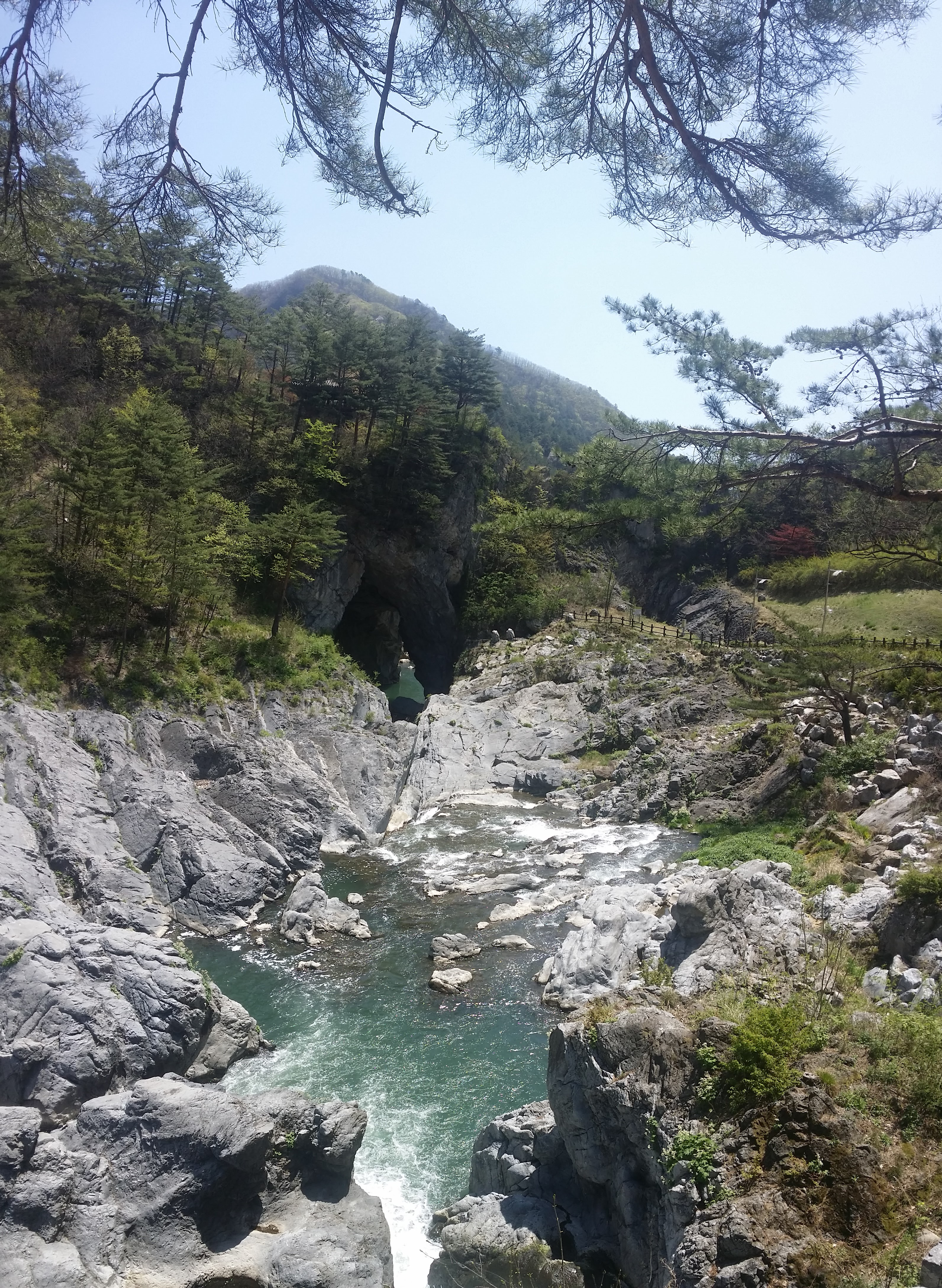
Downstream from the tunnel

=== Joseon era to present ===
Sinjŭng Tongguk yŏji sŭngnam, a 1530 geography book, notes: "The Hwangjicheon is located 110 ri west of Samcheok-bu. Its waters flow south for about 30 ri, piercing through a small mountain and continuing southward—called Cheoncheon".

During the Japanese colonial period, the Japanese dug a tunnel next to Gumunso in 1937 to build a road to transport coal and workers.

On April 28, 2000, the "Ordovician Deposits and Topography of Stream Erosion of Gumunso" was designated as the 417th Natural Monument of South Korea.

In September 1998, the Taebaek city reduced the number of neighborhoods from 16 to 8, merging Dongjeom-dong and Jangseong-dong (장성동) together. The resulting dong was named Gumunso-dong.

== Folklore ==
There are a lot of folkloric myths surrounding Gumunso. One creation myth correctly identifies Sagundari as an abandoned channel: the story involves a large tree that has been uprooted in a flood, explaining how it crashed into the mountain and created the tunnel. Another legend involves the legendary king Yu the Great accidentally creating the tunnel with his sword while learning water control. One tells the story of the White Dragon blasting the tunnel while battling the Blue Dragon for the control over the Nakdong river. Historic prophetic work Jeonggamnok claims that going through the stone tunnel during midnight will bring one to a paradise free from hunger.

== See also ==
- Meander cutoff
- Geology of South Korea
