= Slow mailbox =

Delayed mailing service

A slow mailbox is a service in which letters are stored and delivered only after an extended duration, typically a year.

Slow mailboxes are popular in South Korea (느린 우체통). According to Korea TV, the first of its kind in the country was installed in 2009 at a commemorative hall for the Yeongjong Bridge.

== See also ==
- Time capsule
