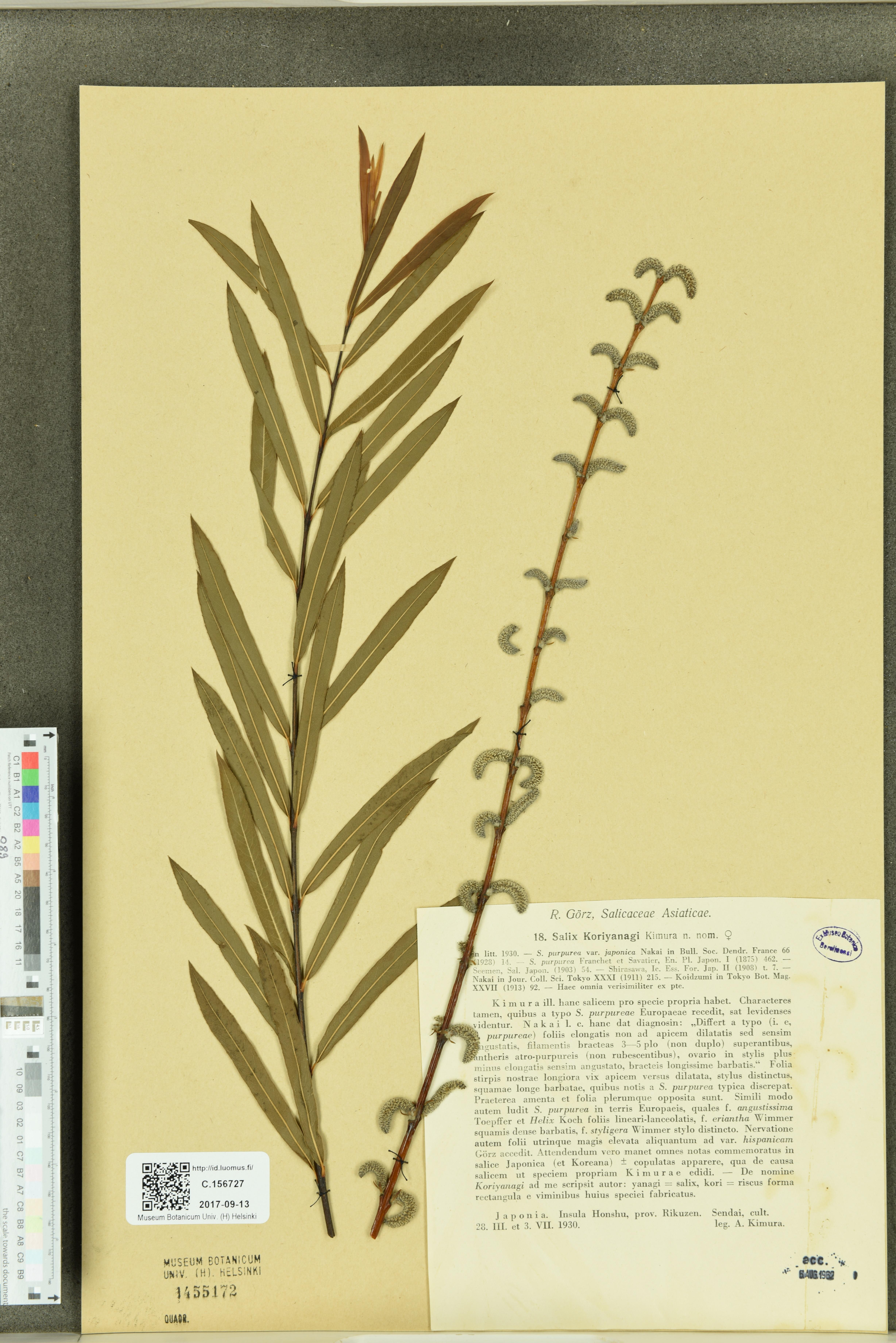

Scientific classification
- Kingdom: Plantae
- Clade: Tracheophytes
- Clade: Angiosperms
- Clade: Eudicots
- Clade: Rosids
- Order: Malpighiales
- Family: Salicaceae
- Genus: Salix
- Species: S. koriyanagi

Binomial name
- Salix koriyanagi Kimura ex Goerz

Synonyms
- Salix koriyanagi f. rubra (Nakai) W.Lee; Salix purpurea var. japonica Nakai; Salix purpurea f. rubra Nakai

= Salix koriyanagi =

Species of willow

Salix koriyanagi is a species of willow native to the Korean Peninsula, and introduced to Japan. It can reach a height of 4 m (13 ft).

Salix koriyanagi is used primarily in Japan for making baskets and furniture.
