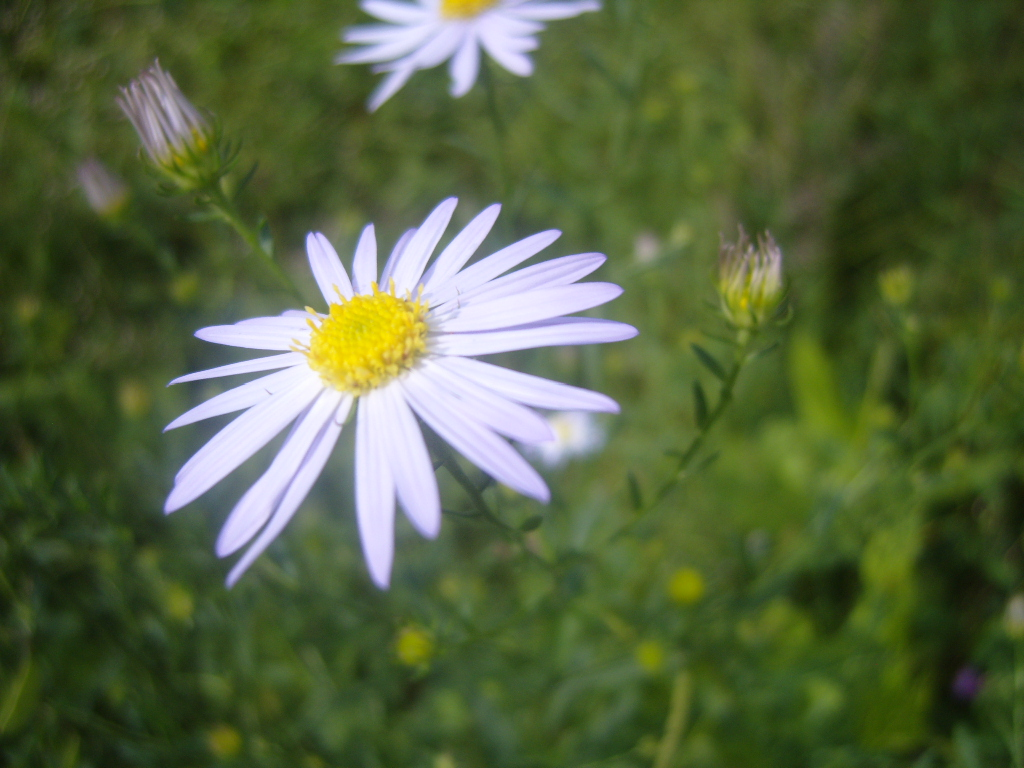

Scientific classification
- Kingdom: Plantae
- Clade: Tracheophytes
- Clade: Angiosperms
- Clade: Eudicots
- Clade: Asterids
- Order: Asterales
- Family: Asteraceae
- Genus: Miyamayomena
- Species: M. koraiensis

Binomial name
- Miyamayomena koraiensis (Nakai) Kitam.

Synonyms
- Aster koraiensis Nakai

= Miyamayomena koraiensis =

Species of plant

Miyamayomena koraiensis (Korean:벌개미취), commonly called Korean starwort, is a herbaceous perennial plant of the family Asteraceae (Compositae). It can be found in temperate regions, mostly in Korea, in lawns, on roadsides, and other areas with moist soils. Korean starwort is a Korean endemic plant and was first named in the genus Aster in 1909. In Korea, its young leaves are used in food preparation.

== Description ==
Aster koraiensis is a perennial herb. The height is about 50~60 cm. The leaves are green color, alternate, lanceolate and pinnately lobed. They are 12~19 cm length and 1.5~3 cm width of leaves. The main stem grows from rhizome, a horizontal stem of plant that is found underground. The leaves on the roots, radical leaves, fall when flowers begin to open. Leaflike bracts can be found. The flower is bisexual and pale violet color and has an inflorescence head which diameter is about 4~5 cm (Only one flower per stem). The involucre is 13 mm length, and 8 mm diameter and has four lines of involucral scale. The achene has about 4 mm length and 1.3 mm diameter and lanceolate shape. There is no pappus. It blooms from June to September; the fruits (achenes) mature in November.

== Distribution ==
Miyamayomena koraiensis originated in Korea and also is naturalized throughout Korea peninsula (South Korea and North Korea). It can be easily found anywhere in Korea (around flower gardens, roadsides, mountains, valley, etc.).

== Origin of the name ==
In the name Aster koraiensis, 'Aster' means "star" in Greek, and 'koraiensis' means "from Korea". Due to the star shape of flower, it got this name.

In Korea, M. koraiensis is called "Beolgaemichui". 'Beol' means bee in Korean so some people think the name "Beolgaemichui (벌개미취)" came from the belief that bees love this flower.

== Language of flowers ==
In the language of flowers, sometimes called floriography, this flower means "I will never forget the memory, nostalgia, and you."
