= Descending life line =

Fire evacuation device

How to use a descending life line

A descending life line (DLL), also known by wanganggi (Korean: 완강기), kankōki (Japanese: 緩降機), or huǎnjiàngqì (Chinese: 缓降器), is a type of emergency descent device installed in mid-rise buildings across East Asia, intended for use when conventional evacuation routes are blocked. Like auto belays used in rock climbing, it slowly lowers the user to the ground with their own weight. Some types are single-use only while others can be used multiple times. DLLs are usually installed near windows or balconies.

== Usage ==
1. Hook the apparatus to the designated anchor (may be a re-enforced ring or a specialized arm)
2. Tighten the nut to secure the hook
3. Extend the arm outside the window (if it exists).
4. Throw the spool outside the window.
5. Equip the belt at shoulder height, tucking it under the armpits.
6. Fasten the safety ring by pulling it towards the torso.
7. Descend while pushing against the wall with outstretched arms.

== Name ==
English translations of the name of the device differ between languages.

Name comparison between languages
Language	Native script	Romanization	English translation
Korean	완강기	wanganggi	descending life line
Japanese	緩降機	kankōki	descent device
Mandarin	Traditional: 緩降機; Simplified: 缓降器	huǎnjiàngqì	lifesaving elevator, escape sling

== History ==
=== South Korea ===
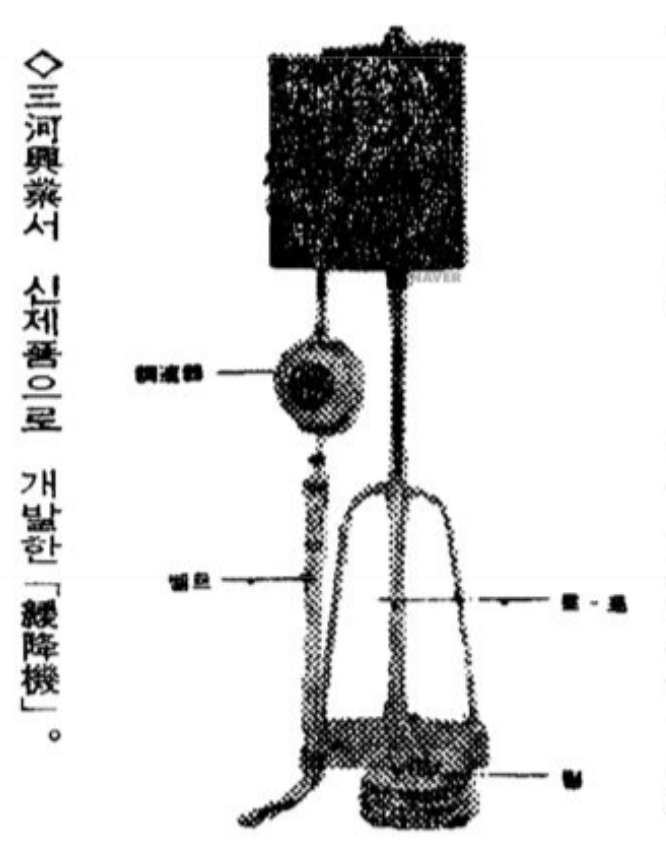
1976 design of descending life lines (완강기)

DLLs have been recognized as an "evacuation device" (피난기구) in law since at least 1968, making them an acceptable choice for fulfilling fire code requirements.

삼하흥업 was a former producer of descending life lines. Its 1976 design featured a "50mm wide, 3mm thick belt attached to both ends of the rope" that "can be adjusted with a ring to fit the user's chest size," with the ability to attach a pouch.

By 1984, regulations required hotels to have a simple DLLs installed on floors 6 through 10. These laws were further strengthened in 2004 and 2006. In 2012, DLL weight capacity requirement was upgraded from 1000N (~100kg) to 1500N (~150kg)

As of 2024, generally speaking, floors from 3 to 11 of most buildings must have a DLL, with additional requirements based on floor area and use. In particular, each room of hotels and lodgings must be equipped with one regular DLL or two or more single-use DLLs In some situations, life lines are optional, and can be replaced with other types of evacuation devices. Its installation and maintenance are governed by 피난기구의 화재안전성능기준 (NFPC 301) and 피난기구의 화재안전기술기준(NFTC 301).

Since the amendment of the Enforcement Decree of the Fire Services Act by Presidential Decree No. 15485 (소방법시행령) on September 27, 1997, any new DLL models must be approved by designated authorities such as Korea Fire Institute to be installed in buildings. Later, with the amendment of the Enforcement Decree of the Act on Installation, Maintenance, and Safety Control of Fire-Fighting Systems by Presidential Decree No. 19128 (소방시설 설치유지 및 안전관리에 관한 법률 시행령) on November 11, 2005, the term was revised to include DLL supports. The decree was amended again by Presidential Decree No. 23571 on January 31, 2012, to explicitly include single-use DLLs.

=== Japan ===
In Japan, all DLL models must be approved by Japan Fire Equipment Inspection Institute, after which they will be labelled with an identification number. Installation and maintenance are governed by the laws 緩降機の技術上の規格を定める省令, 消防法, and 消防法施行令.

== Issues ==
Many DLLs are poorly maintained. A 2007 study found that out of 300 DLLs surveyed, 34% were placed near a hard-to-break unopenable windows, 24% lacked instruction manuals, 20% were placed in wrong locations, and another 20% were damaged. It recommended that unopenable windows be less than 6mm thick.

Many DLLs are also placed in hard-to-spot locations. A 2018 poll of 307 Sejong and Daejeon residents showed that ~80% never had used a descending life line, and ~60% did not know whether a life line existed in their workplace or school, with similar percentage for their home.

DLLs are difficult to use for older people. There have incidents in which improper operation caused users to fall to death.

Many older apartments still lack DLLs due to grandfather clauses in fire code.

Development of new designs are ongoing, improving on usability and safety.
