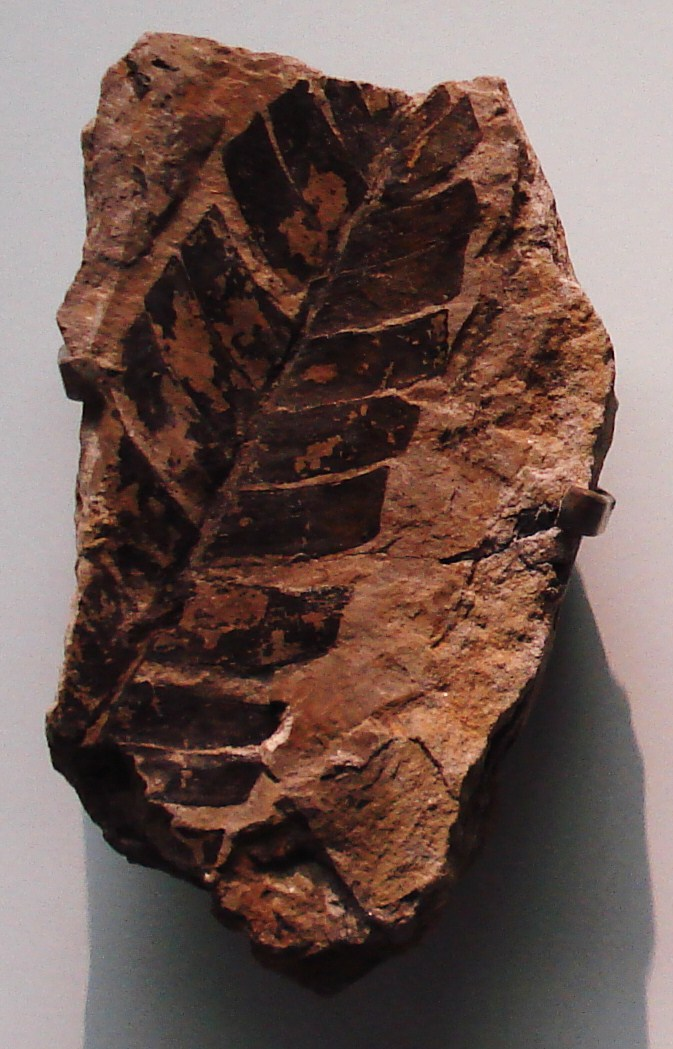
- Nilssonia polymorpha

Scientific classification
- Kingdom: Plantae
- Clade: Tracheophytes
- Clade: Gymnospermae
- Order: †Nilssoniales (?)
- Genus: †Nilssonia (Brongniart), 1825.

Species
- †N. brevis (Type species); †N. compta; †N. eskensis; †N. gristhorpensis; †N. kendalli; †N. lunzensis; †N. neuberi; †N. tenuicaulis; †N. tenuinervis

= Nilssonia (plant) =

Nilssonia Temporal range: Triassic–Late Cretaceous

Fossil plant of gondwana supergroup of India

Nilssonia is a genus of fossil foliage traditionally assigned to the Cycadophyta either in Cycadales or their own order Nilssoniales, though the relationships of this genus with the Cycadales have been put into question on chemical grounds.

== Taxonomy ==
The genus was erected by Brongniart under the name Nilsonia based on material from the Hettangian of Scania. The spelling of the name (a dedication to Sven Nilsson) was later corrected to Nilssonia. The diagnosis of the genus, initially based on the pinnate Nilssonia brevis, was later amended to include entire-margined and irregularly segmented species as well as information on the cuticle.

== Description ==
Nilssonia leaves can have entire margins, irregularly dissected margins or clearly divided leaflets. The lamina or the leaflets are attached to the midrib or rachis on the 'upper' (adaxial) side of the leaf, unlike in other similar genera such as Taeniopteris. Parallel veins exit the midrib, with no fusion of veins.

== Distribution ==
Fossils of Nilssonia are found in Triassic, Jurassic and Cretaceous-aged terrestrial strata of East Asia, Australia, North and South America, and Europe.

The distribution of this genus in the Northern Hemisphere extended to low latitudes in Europe and Asia during the Triassic to Middle Jurassic. During the Late Jurassic, the distribution of Nilssonia contracted to higher latitudes in the Siberian area, where the genus persisted up to the Late Cretaceous.
