= Taebaek =

City in Gangwon, South Korea

- City
- Panoramic view of Taebaek

- Location in South Korea
- Coordinates: 37°10′04″N 128°59′27″E
- Country: South Korea
- Province: Gangwon
- Administrative divisions: 8 dong

Area
  - Total: 303.53 km^{2} (117.19 sq mi)

Population (2025)
  - Total: 36,823
  - Density: 121.32/km^{2} (314.21/sq mi)
- Climate: Dwb

Korean name
- Hangul: 태백시
- Hanja: 太白市
- RR: Taebaek-si
- MR: T'aebaek-si

Taebaek (Korean: 태백; Korean pronunciation: [tʰɛ.bɛk̚]) is a city in the province of Gangwon in South Korea. Its name is shared with that of the Taebaek Mountains. With a population of 36,823, it is the least populous city in the country.

Situated at an elevation of 650 to 700 m (2,130 to 2,300 ft), Taebaek is the second highest city in South Korea, after Pyeongchang.

== Etymology ==
Taebaek is derived from Taebaeksan, meaning "very bright."

== Climate ==
Climate data for Taebaek (1991–2020 normals, extremes 1985–present)
Month	Jan	Feb	Mar	Apr	May	Jun	Jul	Aug	Sep	Oct	Nov	Dec	Year
Record high °C (°F)	12.2 (54.0)	20.1 (68.2)	21.6 (70.9)	29.7 (85.5)	32.6 (90.7)	35.0 (95.0)	35.7 (96.3)	35.6 (96.1)	31.8 (89.2)	26.9 (80.4)	22.6 (72.7)	15.2 (59.4)	35.6 (96.1)
Mean daily maximum °C (°F)	0.7 (33.3)	3.1 (37.6)	7.9 (46.2)	15.1 (59.2)	20.8 (69.4)	24.0 (75.2)	25.9 (78.6)	26.0 (78.8)	21.5 (70.7)	16.8 (62.2)	9.9 (49.8)	3.0 (37.4)	14.6 (58.3)
Daily mean °C (°F)	−4.7 (23.5)	−2.5 (27.5)	2.4 (36.3)	8.9 (48.0)	14.5 (58.1)	18.1 (64.6)	21.4 (70.5)	21.3 (70.3)	16.2 (61.2)	10.5 (50.9)	4.2 (39.6)	−2.3 (27.9)	9.0 (48.2)
Mean daily minimum °C (°F)	−9.6 (14.7)	−7.8 (18.0)	−2.9 (26.8)	2.9 (37.2)	8.4 (47.1)	12.9 (55.2)	17.7 (63.9)	17.7 (63.9)	11.7 (53.1)	5.0 (41.0)	−0.9 (30.4)	−7.1 (19.2)	4.0 (39.2)
Record low °C (°F)	−21.7 (−7.1)	−20.3 (−4.5)	−16.8 (1.8)	−8.2 (17.2)	−2.1 (28.2)	0.5 (32.9)	5.6 (42.1)	8.3 (46.9)	1.0 (33.8)	−7.1 (19.2)	−15.2 (4.6)	−18.5 (−1.3)	−21.7 (−7.1)
Average precipitation mm (inches)	26.6 (1.05)	28.8 (1.13)	54.8 (2.16)	85.8 (3.38)	90.2 (3.55)	140.4 (5.53)	274.2 (10.80)	278.7 (10.97)	198.4 (7.81)	65.5 (2.58)	45.2 (1.78)	19.4 (0.76)	1,308 (51.50)
Average precipitation days (≥ 0.1 mm)	7.2	6.5	9.9	9.5	9.0	11.2	16.3	16.0	12.0	7.2	8.1	6.2	119.1
Average snowy days	10.7	9.7	9.9	2.1	0.0	0.0	0.0	0.0	0.0	0.5	3.3	7.6	44.0
Average relative humidity (%)	59.1	58.4	59.2	55.4	59.4	71.2	78.3	79.9	79.3	70.5	63.6	58.4	66.1
Mean monthly sunshine hours	174.9	178.3	202.7	207.2	232.9	192.7	143.8	141.7	147.4	178.7	159.6	169.8	2,129.7
Percentage possible sunshine	54.0	56.2	53.4	54.6	50.4	42.8	30.5	39.5	48.8	57.4	51.6	53.4	48.6
Source: Korea Meteorological Administration (snow and percent sunshine 1981–2010)

== Demographics ==
Historical population
Year	Pop.	±%
1970	102,255	—
1980	111,825	+9.4%
1990	89,779	−19.7%
2000	54,196	−39.6%
2010	51,558	−4.9%
2020	41,494	−19.5%
Source: Korean Statistical Information Service

As of 2025, the population is 36,823, of which 50.7% are male and 49.3% are female. Minors make up 9.9% of the population, and seniors make up 32.7%. Foreigners make up 1.7% of the total population.

=== Religion ===
As of 2015, 20.6% of the population follow Buddhism, 18.1% follow Christianity (of which 13.7% Protestantism and 4.5% Catholicism), 0.6% follow other religions and 60.7% are irreligious.

== Attractions ==
Manggyeongsa Temple in Hyeol-dong, at an elevation of 1,460 meters on the Taebaek Mountains, is a temple built to enshrine the statue of the Bodhisattva of wisdom. It was built by Jajang, a Silla Dynasty monk. The "Dragon Spring" at the entrance of the temple is known as the highest spring in Korea. Other attractions include Taebaek Coal Museum, Taebaek Paleozoic Museum, and 365 Safe Town. Gumunso is a famous natural landmark in Taebaek.

== Transport ==
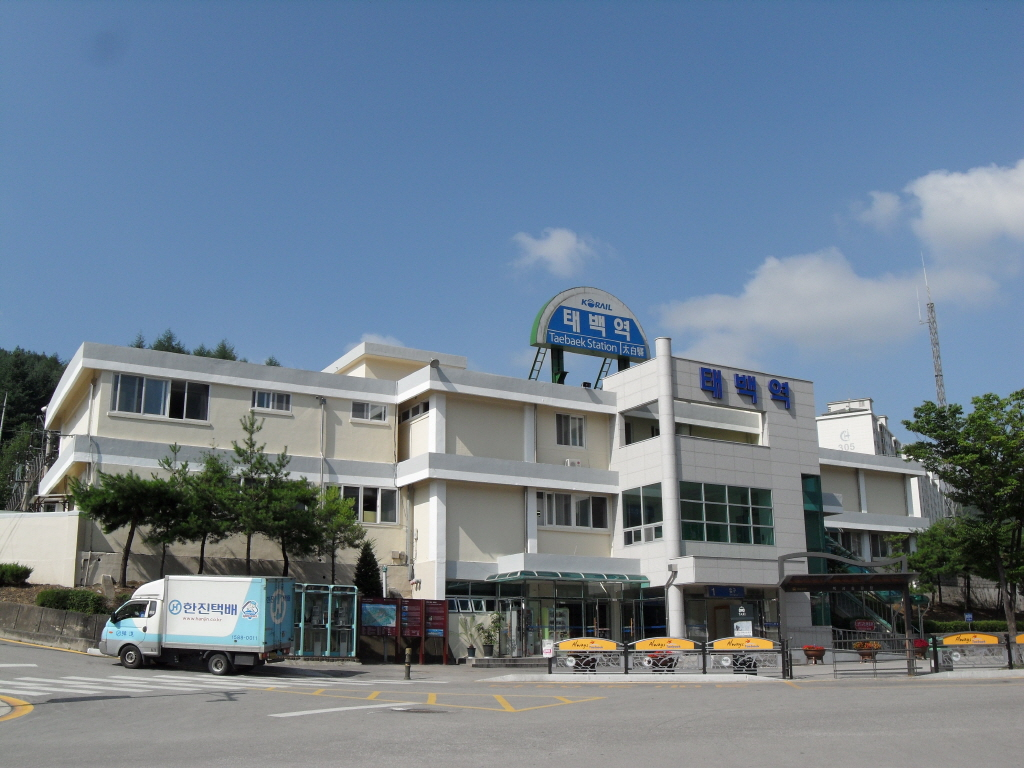
Taebaek station

- Taebaek station

== Notable people ==
- Jo Mingyu, often spelled Cho Minkyu (born 19 November 1990) South Korean opera singer, the leader and leggero tenor of crossover vocal group Forestella

== International relations ==
=== Twin towns – sister cities ===
- Helong, Jilin, China since August 29, 1995
- Baguio, Philippines since April 25, 2006
- Suzhou, Jiangsu, China since March 8, 2005
- Gao'an, Jiangxi, China since June 23, 2004
- Changchun, Jilin, China since January 18, 2006
- Bauang, La Union, Philippines since January 26, 2024

== See also ==
- List of cities in South Korea
- List of highest towns by country
