= Honey Creek =

Honey Creek may refer to some places in the United States:

== Indiana ==
- Honey Creek (White River tributary), a stream in Johnson County, Indiana
- Honey Creek, Indiana, an unincorporated community in Henry County
- Honey Creek Township, Vigo County, Indiana
- Honey Creek Middle School, in Terre Haute, Indiana
- Honey Creek Railroad, a Class III short-line railroad in Rush County, Indiana

== Iowa ==
- Honey Creek (Des Moines River tributary), a river in Iowa
- Honey Creek (Iowa River tributary), a river in Iowa
- Honey Creek (Missouri River tributary), a river in Iowa
- Honey Creek (Platte River tributary), a stream in Iowa and Missouri
- Honey Creek Township, Delaware County, Iowa
- Honey Creek Township, Iowa County, Iowa
- Honey Creek, Pottawattamie County, Iowa, an unincorporated community

== Missouri ==
- Honey Creek, Missouri, an unincorporated community
- Honey Creek Conservation Area, a park in Andrew County, Missouri
- Honey Creek (Beaver Creek tributary), a stream in Douglas County, Missouri
- Honey Creek (Big Creek tributary), a stream in Missouri
- Honey Creek (Blackwater River tributary), a stream in Missouri
- Honey Creek (Grand River tributary), a stream in Missouri
- Honey Creek (Fox River tributary), a stream in Missouri
- Honey Creek (Limestone Creek tributary), a stream in Dade County, Missouri
- Honey Creek (Moreau River tributary), a stream in Missouri
- Honey Creek (Platte River tributary), a stream in Iowa and Missouri
- Honey Creek (Spring River tributary), a stream in Missouri

== Wisconsin ==
- Honey Creek, Sauk County, Wisconsin, a town
- Honey Creek, Walworth County, Wisconsin, an unincorporated community
- Honey Creek (Wisconsin River tributary), a stream in Sauk County

== Elsewhere ==
- Honey Creek Township, Adams County, Illinois
- Honey Creek (Perry County, Ohio), a stream
- Honey Creek (Pennsylvania), a tributary of Kishacoquillas Creek
- Honey Creek (Texas), list of Honey Creek place names in Texas
