= Polecat (disambiguation) =

Polecat is a common name for several species of mustelids. The term is also sometimes applied to the skunk in the southern United States.

Polecat may also refer to:

== Places in the United States ==
- Polecat, Tennessee, an unincorporated community
- Polecat Creek (disambiguation)

== Arts and entertainment ==
- Polecat (band), an American country/bluegrass/rock band
- The Polecats, a 1980s British neo-rockabilly band
- "Polecats", a basic repertoire of 12 traditional barbershop songs
- The Polecats, a fictional gang in the 1995 video game Full Throttle

== Other uses ==
- HMS Polecat (1782), a Royal Navy brig-sloop
- Lockheed Martin Polecat, an unmanned aerial vehicle
- Bob Poley (born 1955), Canadian football player nicknamed "Pole Cat" or "Polecat"
- Norwest Polecats, a Rugby League club playing out of the NSW Tertiary Student Rugby League competition in Australia

== See also ==
- Camille Armand Jules Marie, Prince de Polignac (1832–1913), French nobleman, French brigadier general and Confederate major-general nicknamed "Prince Polecat"
- Osaki
- Kuda-gitsune
