= Polecat Creek =

Polecat Creek may refer to:

- Polecat Creek (Iowa), a stream in Iowa
- Polecat Creek (Grand River), a stream in Missouri
- Polecat Creek (Wilkerson Creek), a stream in Missouri
- Polecat Creek (Deep River tributary), a stream in North Carolina
- Polecat Creek (Arkansas River tributary), a stream in Oklahoma
- Polecat Creek (Banister River tributary), a stream in Halifax County, Virginia
- Polecat Creek (band), a North Carolina folk band

== See also ==
- Polecat (disambiguation)
