= Nihon Ryakki =

The Nihon Ryakki (日本略記) or Nihon Ryakuki (1596) (An Abbreviated Record of Japan) is a chronicle of the history of Japan. It mentions the kitsune.

== See also ==
- Nihon Shoki
