= Kitsune =

Fox spirits in Japanese folklore

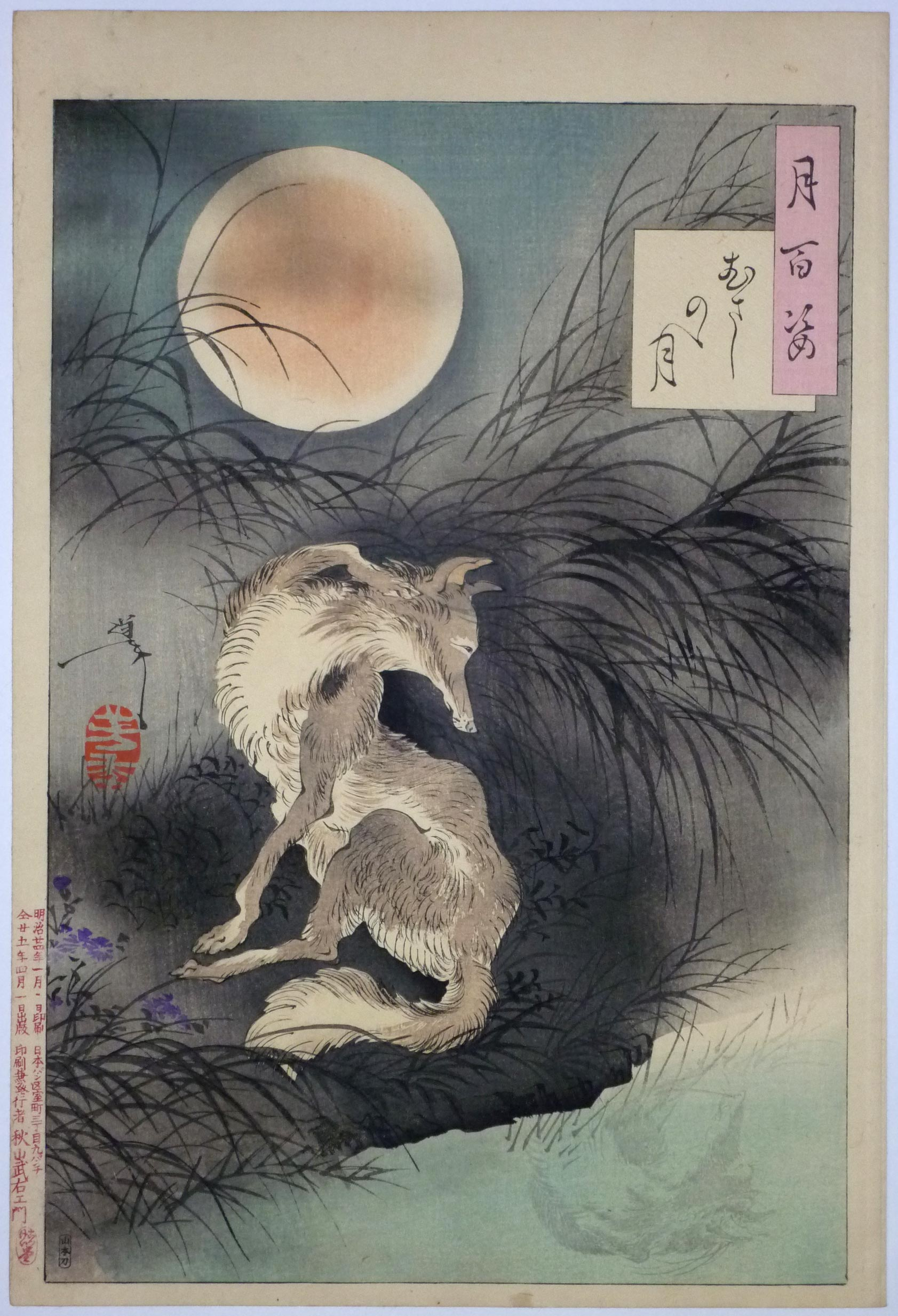
The moon on Musashi Plain (fox) by Tsukioka Yoshitoshi

The kitsune (狐, きつね; IPA: [kʲi̥t͡sɨne̞]), in popular Japanese folklore, is a fox or fox spirit which possesses the supernatural ability to shapeshift or bewitch other life forms.

== General overview ==
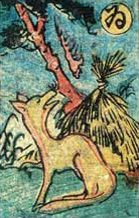
This obake karuta ('monster card') from the early 19th century depicts a kitsune. The associated game involves matching clues from folklore to pictures of specific creatures.

Kitsune, though literally a 'fox', becomes in folklore a 'fox spirit', and a type of yōkai. They are ascribed intelligence and magical or supernatural powers, especially with long-living foxes.

The kitsune exhibit the ability of bakeru, or transforming ones shape and appearance, like the tanuki (Note: As in the proverbial kitsune shichi bake, tanuki ya bake (狐七化け、狸八化け; 'fox shapeshifts 7 times, racoon dog shapeshifts 8 times').), (Note: The racoon dog is commonly referred to as "badger" by Western orientalists, e.g. de Visser.) as well as the ability to bakasu, i.e. beguile or bewitch. These terms are related to the generic term bakemono meaning "spectre" or "goblin". Another scholar describes the kitsune as being a "disorienting deity" (that makes the traveler lose his way) (Note: Itō's translation for madoeshi kami (迷ヘシ神; 'beguiling god') which he takes from a title of a tale in Konjaku monogatarishū. Itō also uses the term kitsubaka (狐化; "Bewitching Fox") but this is not standard vocabulary for a lay person (not listed in Kōjien, 2nd rev. ed.), and perhaps is insider jargon, as Itō provides the instance of its use among researchers doing this type of fieldwork.). Such capabilities were also ascribed to badgers (actually tanuki or raccoon dog) and occasionally to cats (cf. bakeneko).

The archetypal method by which the kitsune tricks (bakasu) humans is to lead them astray or make them lose their way. The experiences of people losing their way (usually in the mountain after dark) and blaming the kitsune fox has been recounted first or secondhand to folklorists well into the present times. (Note: Ito says "someone" losing the way, which is understood to mean the informant or someone other.)

Other typical standard tricks occur as folktale (Note: And subtypes of folktales called seken banashi, "chat over trifles of life", used by Itsuko Yamada who is cited.) types: people are tricked into taking a "bath in a night-soil pot" (i.e., manure pit (Note: The fox may also trick people into falling into this koe dame (肥溜め; 'manure pit')) (Note: Lafcadio Hearn: "enter a cesspool in the belief they are taking a bath")), or eating "horse-dung dumpling", (Note: Hearn: "eat horse-dung in the belief they are eating mochi") or accepting "leaf money" (cf. § Tricksters). (Note: "104. Taking a Bath in a Nigh-soil Pot", "105. The Horse-dung Dumpling", "108. Leaf Money") (Note: Keigo Seiki first published his folktale type in Japanese, but it used a different numbering system. So in Seki's Nihon mukashibanashi shūsei (日本昔話集成) (or ~taisei (大成)), the major category is honkaku or genuine type mukashibanashi tale, mid-category is "People and Foxes" (#270-#287) of which we have as sampled by the sources #270 shiri nozoki (「尻のぞき」; 'butt-peeking'), #271A furo wa koetsubo (「風呂は肥壺」; 'bath is nightsoil pit'), #271B uma no kuso dango (「馬の糞団子」; 'horse dung dumpling'), #274uma no kuso dango (銭は木の葉」; 'money is tree-leaf'))

The "fox wife" theme occurs in a number of noted medieval works (e.g. Nihon ryōiki), but on that theme, the story of nine-tailed vixen Tamamo-no-mae ('Jewel-algae ladyship') and sessho-seki ("murder stone") deserve special attention, as well as the story of a vixen Kuzunoha giving birth to the astrologist-magician Abe no Seimei.

The "Fox wife" is also a folktale type category. (Note: "147. Fox Wife".) There is a weather myth that associates sunshine rain with the kitsune's wedding (Cf. § Kitsune no yomeiri), and its folktale type. (Note: 1. 285 kitsune no yometori (「狐の嫁取」; 'fox's wife-taking').)

The fox jewel or tama (cf. § Fox jewel) sometimes occurs in folktale tradition as something held important by the fox, sometimes as the item necessary for it to transform or conduct other magic. This and the kitsunebi ('fox-fire'), which the creature is reputed to be capable of firing off (cf. § Kitsunebi control), are standard parts of the pictorial depictions of kitsune, especially on a white kitsune or byakko (§ Iconography).

The kitsune came to be associated with Inari, a Shinto kami or spirit, and serve as its messengers (§ Inari Shinto deity). The fox is also a figure in Buddhism as the mount of the deva Dakini, and there is some conflation between the two deities (§ Buddhist context).

Another dimension is that the kitsune was thought capable of spiritual possession or kitsunetsuki (q.v.), which was a superstition widespread throughout Japan. This is multi-faceted: the illness causing possession might be sought to be exorcized by hiring some shaman, but the fox can turn into a benevolent guardian spirit also, or both, as in the case of an 11th century tale (cf. Kitsunetsuki#Hungry fox).

For an unwanted possession to be exorcised, a professional miko priestess (as in the foregoing tale) or a shugendō priest would be consulted, well into the 20th century as the superstition persisted. A miko or itako purports to be capable of forcing a controlled possession of herself by a fox spirit, and engage in kuchiyose, a sort of séance to speak on behalf of the spirit.

The concept of certain families being "fox owners" (kitsune-mochi) due to having tamed a jinko or ninko were written about in the Edo Period and Meiji era, but appear to be localized around Izumo Province (also further described under kitsunetsuki) which was the backdrop of Lafcadio Hearn's folkloristics. In Izumo, the "owner" families were feared as being able to unleash the fox spirits on normal people.

In other regions, it is only the yamabushi or lay priests trained in shugendō who have the reputation of using kiko (気狐; lit. "air/chi fox"). In some cases, the fox or fox-spirit summoned is called the osaki. The familiar may also be known as the kuda-gitsune (管狐; lit. "tube fox, pipe fox") because they were believed to be so small, or become so small as to fit inside a tube.

The kitsune appears in numerous Japanese works. Noh (Kokaji), kyogen (Tsurigitsune), or bunraku and kabuki (Ashiya Dōman ōuchi kagami, Yoshitsune Senbon Zakura) plays derived from folk tales feature them, as do contemporary works such as native animations, comic books and video games.

== Etymology ==
The full etymology of kitsune is unknown. The oldest known usage of the word is in the text Shin'yaku Kegonkyō Ongi Shiki, dating to 794.

Other old sources include the aforementioned story in the Nihon ryōiki (810–824) and Wamyō Ruijushō (c. 934). These old sources are written in Man'yōgana, which clearly identifies the historical form of the word (when rendered into a Latin-alphabet transliteration) as ki_{1}tune. Following several diachronic phonological changes, this became kitsune.

The fox-wife narrative in Nihon ryōiki gives the folk etymology kitsu-ne as 'come and sleep', while in a double-entendre, the phrase can also be parsed differently as ki-tsune to mean 'always comes'.

Many etymological suggestions have been made, though there is no general agreement:

- Myōgoki (1268) suggests that it is so called because it is "always (tsune) yellow (ki)".
- Arai Hakuseki in Tōga (1717) suggests that ki means 'stench', tsu is a possessive particle, and ne is related to inu, the word for 'dog'.
- Tanikawa Kotosuga in Wakun no Shiori (1777–1887) suggests that ki means 'yellow', tsu is a possessive particle, and ne is related to neko, the word for 'cat'.
- Ōtsuki Fumihiko in Daigenkai (1932–1935) proposes that the word comes from kitsu, which is an onomatopoeia for the bark of a fox, and ne, which may be an honorific referring to a servant of an Inari shrine.
- Nozaki also suggests that the word was originally onomatopoetic: kitsu represented a fox's yelp and came to be the general word for 'fox'; -ne signified an affectionate mood.

Kitsu is now archaic; in modern Japanese, a fox's cry is transcribed as kon kon or gon gon.

== Nihongi chronicle ==
In the Nihon Shoki (or Nihongi, compiled 720), the fox is mentioned twice, as omens. In the year 657 a byakko or "white fox" was reported to have been witnessed in Iwami Province, possibly a sign of good omen. (Note: The translator Aston's footnoted opinion that this was a good omen is endorsed by Smyers.) And in 659, a fox bit off the end of a creeping vine plant held by the laborer (shrine construction worker), (Note: Although Aston translated that the governor (Kuni no miyatsuko) was ordered to repair the "Istuki Shrine", modern scholarship identify this as the Kumano Taisha in Ou District, Izumo Province. (Note: Watanabe 1974, p. 87: "The reasons given by the Nihon Shoki for renovating the [Kumano] [S]hrine were that a fox had appeared in the Ou district, bitten off a piece of vine, and then disappeared..[and] a dog had bitten off the forearm.. and left it at Iuya Shrine") And it was a conscripted laborer from this Ou District who was holding the vine, which was a construction material for rebuilding the shrine, according to Ujitani's translation.) interpreted as an inauspicious omen foreshadowing the death of Empress Saimei the following year.

For pre-historic considerations before the chronicles, Cf. § Foxes in Japanese archaeology

== Anciently-aged foxes ==
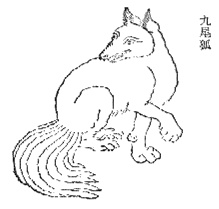
A nine-tailed fox, from the Qing edition of the ancient text Classic of Mountains and Seas

Asakawa Zen'an (1850) argued that there were three classes of foxes, gradable by age, the sky or celestial tenko, (Note: The tenko being designated "celestial fox" or "heavenly fox" is preferable over "sky fox" because "sky" could apply to kūko. Casal renders tenko as celestial vs. kūko (空狐; 'air fox").) the white fox byakko and black fox, of which the tenko was the most ancient, (Note: Zen'an's essay, sourced vaguely to Taiping Guangji and other sources. The tenko being the most ancient is citable to Dai Fu's Guang yi ji.) but had no corporeal form and was strictly a spirit (Note: Zenan's essay (1891)'s: ""精神のみ存在して形はなし" exactly echoes de Visser (1908a)'s "mere spirit (精神) without shape".de Visser 1908a, p. 35)(cf. § Classifications).

In Japanese folklore, Kitsune have as many as nine tails (but this is derived straight from Chinese classics, as explained below). Generally, a greater number of tails indicates an older and more powerful Kitsune; in fact, some folktales say that a fox will only grow additional tails after it has lived 100 years. (Note: The typical lifespan of a wild fox is one to three years, although individuals may live up to ten years in captivity.) One, five, seven, and nine tails are the most common numbers in folktales.

The story was later introduced (established by the 14th century), that the queen-consort Daji (Japanese pronunciation: Dakki) was really a nine-tailed fox that led to the destruction of Yin/Shang dynasty, (Note: The Western Zhou which succeeded was also destroyed in the end by her becoming concubine to its last king.) and the same vixen some 2,000 years later appeared as Tamamo-no-mae in Japan (q.v., also § Tamamo-no-mae and Hokusai's painting of Tamamo previously as Lady Kayō of India). Tamamo clearly draws from Chinese myth and literature, so her being depicted as a golden-furred and kyūbi no kitsune (九尾の狐; 'nine-tailed fox') matches precisely what the Chinese classics writes about the celestial fox (tian hu 天狐) which a 1,000 year old fox turns into. (Note: Smyers 1999, p. 129 collates from her cited source, Mayers, William Frederick (1924) The Chinese Reader's manual, p. 65, cites two sources, Yuan zhong ji (元中記, 1834) (originally called Xuan zhong ji 玄中記 attributed to Guo Pu. Under either title, the relevant quote reads: "狐五十歲能變化為婦人;百歲為美女、為神巫,或為丈夫,與女人交接,能知千里外事,善蠱惑,使人迷惑失智;千歲即與天通為天狐" stating the fox at 50 learns to transform, at 100 becomes a beautiful woman,.. becomes aware of things 1000 li away ...) and then (to quote Mayer) "when a 1,000 years old, is admitted to the Heavens and becomes the 'celestial fox'". The "celestial fox" is described as golden-haired, nine-tailed, and "versed in all secrets of nature" in the second source, Liu tie 六帖 or Bai Kong Liu tie: 白孔六帖: "天狐言九尾金色役於日月宫可洞逹".)

(Cf. also § Chinese parallels)

== Inari Shinto deity ==
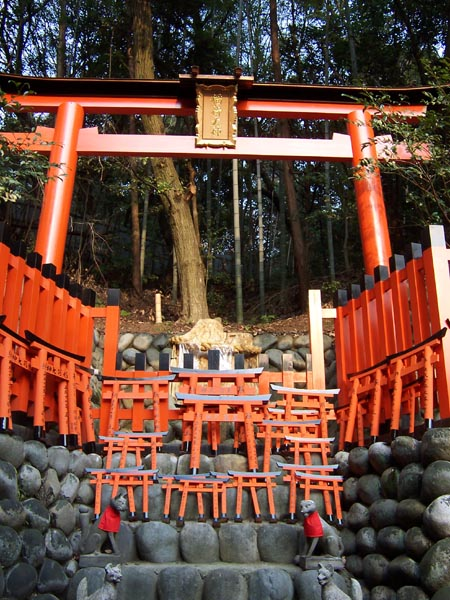
The Fushimi Inari shrine in Kyoto features numerous kitsune statues.

Inari's kitsune are white, a color of a good omen. They possess the power to ward off evil, and they sometimes serve as guardian spirits. In addition to protecting Inari shrines, they are petitioned to intervene on behalf of the locals and particularly to aid against troublesome nogitsune, those spirit foxes who do not serve Inari. Black foxes and nine-tailed foxes are likewise considered good omens.

There can also be attendant or servant foxes associated with Inari, the Shinto deity of rice. Originally, kitsune were Inari's messengers, but the line between the two is now blurred so that Inari Ōkami may be depicted as a fox. Likewise, entire shrines are dedicated to kitsune, where devotees can leave offerings.

According to beliefs derived from fūsui (feng shui), the fox's power over evil is such that a mere statue of a fox can dispel the evil kimon, or energy, that flows from the northeast. Many Inari shrines, such as the famous Fushimi Inari shrine in Kyoto, feature such statues, sometimes large numbers of them.

=== Swordsmith deity ===
Kitsune are traditionally regarded as Inari's messengers rather than the deity itself, but in the Noh play Kokaji, based on the legend of the swordsmith Sanjō Munechika, Inari is described as transforming into the spirit of a fox to assist him. Munechika, active in Kyoto during the reign of Emperor Ichijō (r. 986–1011), was ordered to forge a blade for the emperor but lacked a partner skilled enough to assist him. He traveled to Fushimi Inari Shrine to pray for aid, where a mysterious boy appeared and promised to help him, then vanished onto Mount Inari. When Munechika returned home and began the forging ritual, Inari appeared in place of the boy and matched every hammer stroke without instruction — in some depictions taking the form of a fox, in others appearing with an entourage of foxes as the deity's messengers. The finished blade, Kogitsune-maru ("Little Fox"), was inscribed with both Munechika's smithing name and the word "kogitsune," commemorating the fox spirit's assistance.

This legend is dramatized in the Noh play Kokaji, of unknown authorship, and reflects Inari's wider role as patron deity of smiths and metalworkers, a role closely bound up with the fox as Inari's earthly manifestation. The story has remained a recurring subject in later Japanese art, including Ogata Gekkō's 1887 woodblock print Inariyama Ko-Kaji ("The Swordsmith on Mount Inari"), which depicts Inari and a troop of foxes assisting at the forge, and a 19th-century ivory netsuke showing Inari watching over Munechika as he works

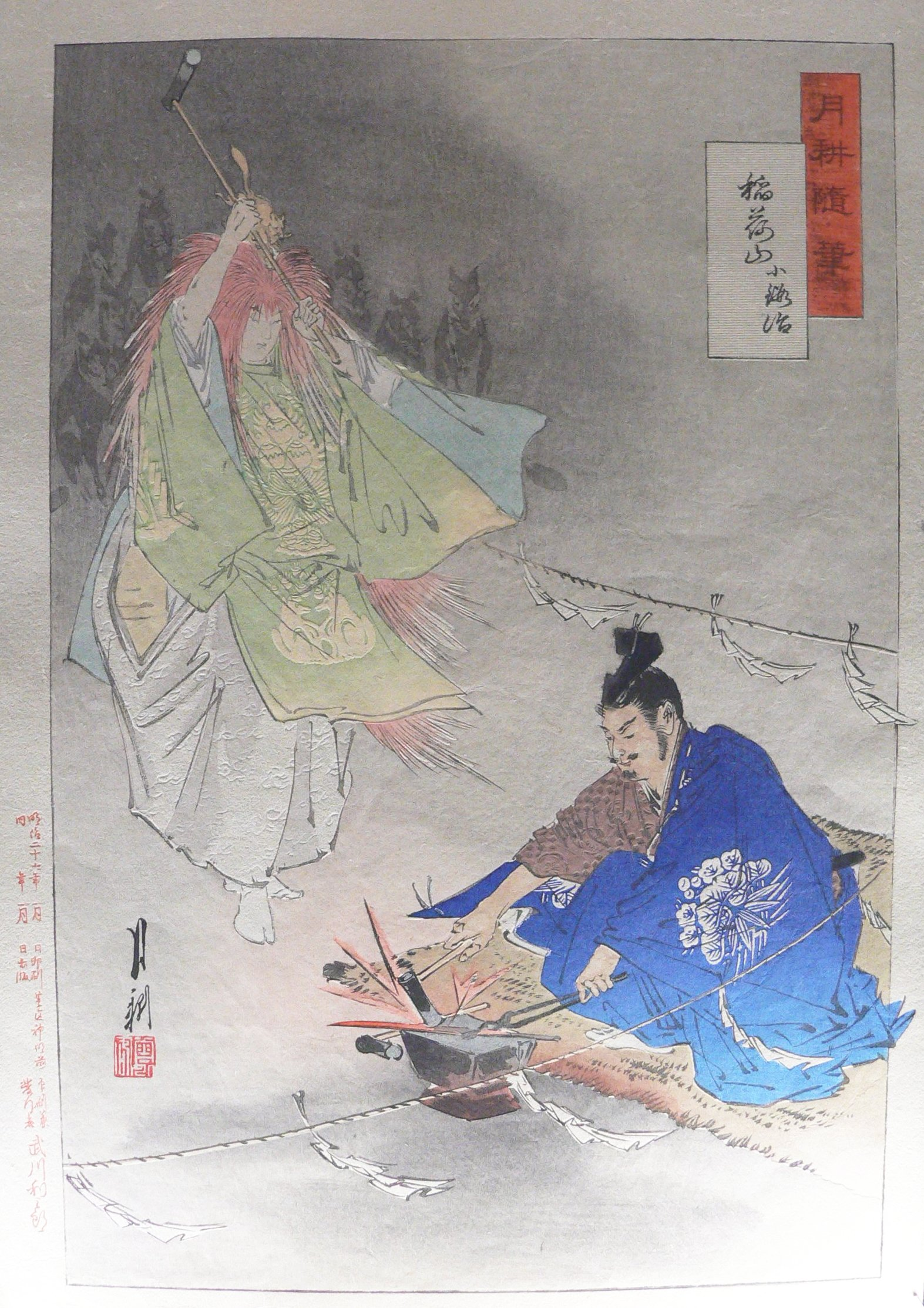
Inari Ōkami and its fox spirits help the blacksmith Sanjō Munechika forge the blade Kogitsune-maru ('Little Fox') at the end of the 10th century. The legend is the subject of the noh drama Sanjō Kokaji.

=== Abura-age ===
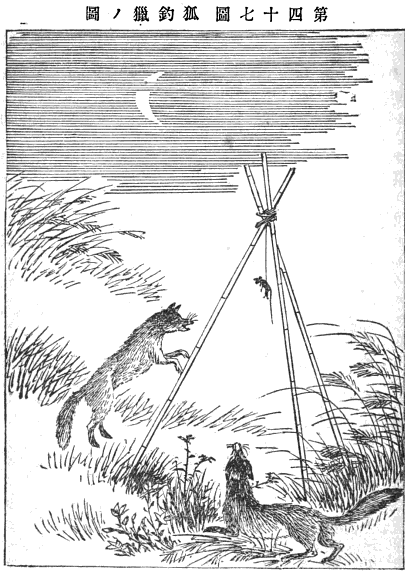
A kitsune-tsuri (lit. 'fox-fishing') trap set with oil-fried rodent (here called "nezumi no tempura") as bait. 19th century Japan.

The fact that Japanese soup noodles garnished with fried slice of tofu called abura-age are called kitsune udon and kitsune soba (in Eastern Japan) stems from the popular belief the Inari deity (and its fox minions) prefer to be offered the abura-age (or sushi-rice stuffed in aburage pouches, called inarizushi).

However, the custom of offering abura-age must have arisen rather late (in the Edo Period). (Note: Tanaka, Takako 1993 Gehō to aihō no chūsei 外法と愛法の中世 apud Mizusawa;also Tanaka 1997.) In comparison, the notion that the fox's favorite food being nezumi no abura-age (鼠の油揚げ) dates farther back, since it is attested in Oyamada Tomokiyo's Matsunoya hikki (c. 1845), which also cites a Muromachi period work Sekyō shō (where there is a metaphor of "springing up like a fox at a yaki-nezumi [roasted rat]").

Watchers of the kyōgen-play Tsurigitsune ("Fox Trapping") know full well that part of the theatrics involves the fox character being driven crazy by the presence of its favorite food, the "oil-fried young mice", (Note: Also early versions of the bunraku play Shinoda zuma ("The Shinoda wife"). Odanaka & Iwai 2020, p. 109: "in the early bunraku version (The Shinoda Wife) [...] she is attracted by the smell of a fried mouse [...] (the idea is also found in Tsuri-Gitsune)") While this freak food bait might be thought of as the stuff of popular belief, (Note: As does Takako Tanaka.) the oil-fried mouse was an effective bait for trapping foxes, and actually used into the modern era (see fig. right).

Some commentators have extrapolated (on websites, etc.) that people used to offer deep-fried mice to Inari Jinja but was switched to vegetarian substitute, but this has already been rejected by scholar Takako Tanaka who offers an alternate origin, where in the esoteric rites of Dakini buddhism (associated with foxes, cf. § Buddhist context) dumpling coated with soy flour was offered, which was people colloquially called something like "oil [dump]ling", (Note: Actually called Ikkai sōjō no abura-ko (一階僧正の油子; "1st rank high priest's oil-ling") (ko means "child", here taken to be a diminutive suffix).) which hints at this actually being an oil-fried dough treat as found in Chinese cuisine. (Note: Keiko Ōmori 大森恵子(2003) also argued along the same vein, pointing out that in the liturgical text Inari Ichiryū Daĳi 稲荷一流大事 the offerings to the Dakini are specified as: "sekihan (red rice), mochi, sake, ma-gashi and aburamono 供物之事赤飯・餅・一酒・真菓子・油物", where the last two apparently refer to non-fried and oil-fried versions of dough confection called futo magari 太摩我里.)

== Buddhist context ==
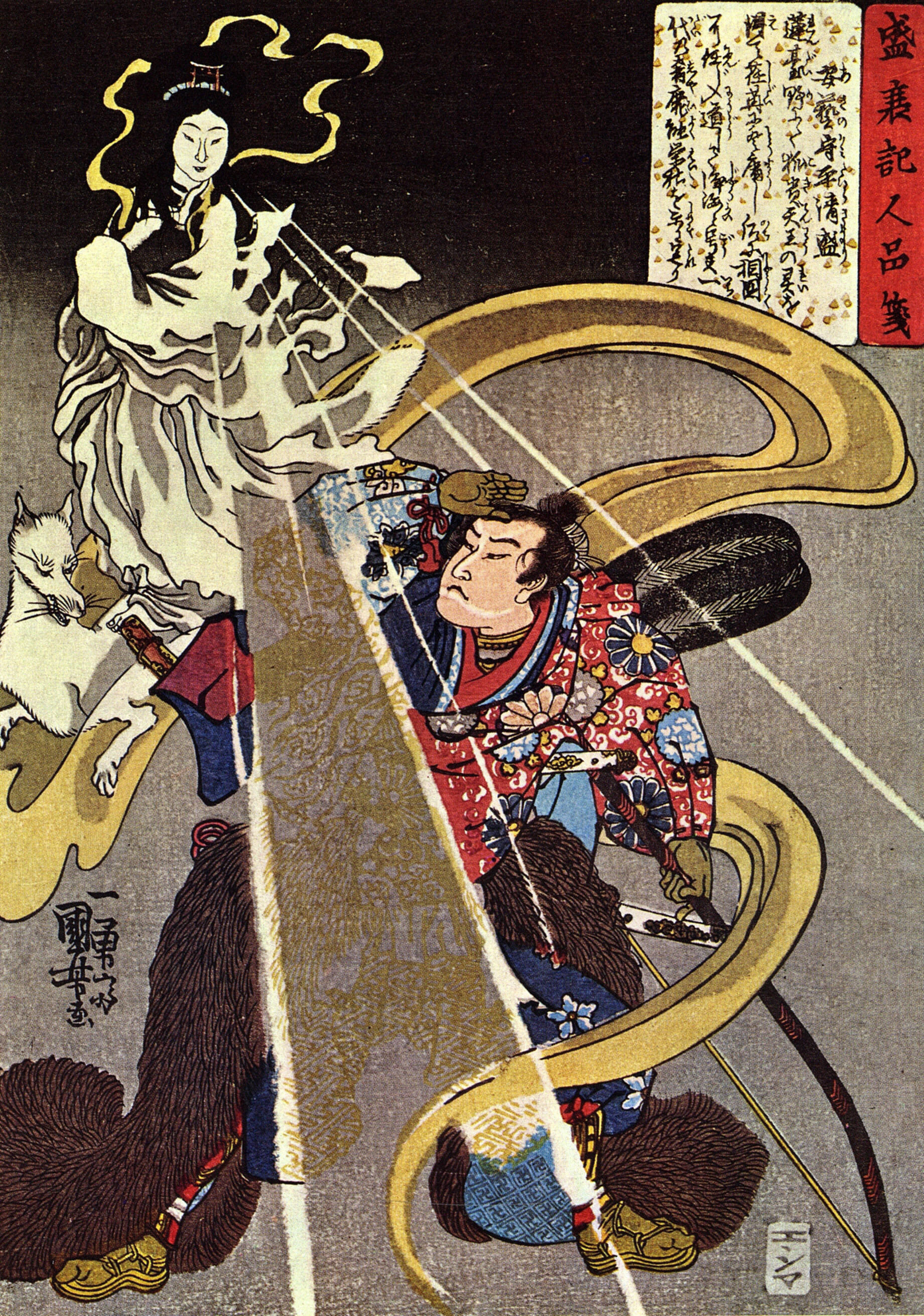
Inari Ōkami appears to a warrior accompanied by a kitsune. This portrayal shows the influence of Dakiniten concepts from Buddhism. Print by Utagawa Kuniyoshi.

Smyers (1999) notes that the idea of the fox as seductress and the connection of the fox myths to Buddhism were introduced into Japanese folklore through similar Chinese stories, but she maintains that some fox stories contain elements unique to Japan.

Foxes were blamed as a cause for illness, and the Buddhist liturgy called rokujikyōhō (六字経法; “Ritual of the Six-syllable Sutra) were being performed to exorcize it since those times (cf. kitsunetsuki).

Kitsune are connected to the Buddhist religion through the Dakiniten, goddesses conflated with Inari's female aspect. Dakiniten is depicted as a female boddhisattva wielding a sword and riding a flying white fox.

== Classifications ==
A number of authors tried to classify and sub-classify the foxes in different ways, starting from the Heian Period, intensifying in the Edo Period. A sample of it is given as anonymously undated opinions by Lafcadio Hearn. (Note: One unidentified source claims the four superior types are the byakko, kokko, zenko, reiko (白狐、黒狐、善狐、霊狐; 'white, black, good, spiritual foxes').)

The Inari Shinto liturgical text Inari no hiden (意根利之秘伝) (1780 colophon) lists five types of foxes to be revered, mainly the three: tenko (celestial), kūko (空狐; 'sky'), chiko (earth), plus byakko (white), and kūko (吾紫霊; probably related to the 'purple fox' of Chinese myth). Minagawa Kien's Yūhisai sakki (有斐斎剳記) ( 1781) appeared, which ranks the yako (野狐; 'wild foxes') as the most obtuse, (Note: Japanese: 鈍, i.e. stupidest.) followed by the newly created kiko (気狐; 'air fox'), kūko (sky), then tenko (celestial). (Note: The Chinese (kanbun) text of this work Yūhisai sakki is embedded in Zen'an zuihitsu (cf. below). but Zack Davisson credites Asakawa Zen'an directly.) Asakawa Zen'an's essay Zen'an zuihitsu, Book 2 (1850) gives his own conclusion that there are tenko, byakko, genko (天狐、白狐、玄狐; 'sky/celestial/, white, black foxes'), graded by age, of which the celestial is the most ancient.

Hearn was of the opinion that these precise and intricate stratifications of fox kind according to learned opinion could not be reconciled with the more down-to-earth picture of the kitsune held by the common peasantry.

(Cf. also § Chinese parallels)

=== Good vs. evil, or ===
Hearn's observation was that the Izumo Province during the time of his residence there did conform to the idea that kitsune divided into the good, which are Inari foxes, and the bad. The worst of the bad are called ninko (人狐; (lit. 'man foxes')) (associated with spiritual possession), and there are other bad, called the yako/nogitsune (野狐; (lit. 'field foxes')).

However, Hearn also doubts that such a stark differentiation between the Inari fox and possession fox (good vs. evil) had always been made by the populace in bygone times, and opines this was something imposed upon by the literati. A similar verdict is rendered by Teiri Nakamura, that "practitioners of religion and the intelligentsia were the ones who made commonplace the divide between the good fox vs bad fox". And it was in that milieu that Miyagawa Masakazu (宮川政運) in Book 3 of his essay work (1858) set apart zenko (善狐; 'good foxes') and yako ('wild foxes') as the bad. (Note: Titled Miyagawa-no-ya manpitsu or Kyūsensha manpitsu (宮川舎漫筆).) According to Miyagawa, the good fox breaks down further into five subtypes: gold, silver, white, black, and celestial.

=== Eye for eye, favor for favor ===
One analysis is that the kitsune will avenge malice with malice, but generally does not repay goodwill with malice, and is loyal to its debt.

An example of revenge is found in a tale set in Kai Province from the 11th century Uji shūi monogatari, where the fox sets fire to a man's home. (Note: Uji shūi monogatari, Book 3. 狐、家に火つくる事.)

An example tale of gratitude involving the dainagon (major counselor) Yasumichi occurs in the Kokon Chomonjū of the mid-13th century, who was pestered by a family of foxes that took up lair at his mansion, and their bake or mischief escalated to a level of intolerance. But the nobleman halted his plan to eradicate them after a fox appeared in his dream to beg mercy. The foxes after that rarely made rowdy noises, except to cry out loud to announce some good fortune about to happen. (Note: Kokon Chomonjū, Book 17, Henge (変化; 'transformation'), no title, incipit: "大納言泰道の五條坊門高倉の亭..". Translated by Tyler as "Enough is Enough",)

=== Ninko ===
A ninko ("man-fox") according to Lafcadio Hearn is a fox spirit, apparently smaller than the usual fox (no larger than a weasel) except its tail being like a normal full-sized fox's. It is invisible so cannot be detected until it takes possession of some human. Actually the ninko is considered to be kept by the kitsune-mochi, i.e., families gossiped to own and control a fox that can possess, gaining success via that power. As Inoue Enryō noted, the ninko held by kitsune-mochi is just a localized version in Izumo (of the lore of "Animal Spirit Families"), which occurs as the lore of the inkgami or dohyō in neighboring Iwami Province.

== Tricksters ==
Kitsune are often presented as tricksters, preferring to victimize laymen over monks according to one anthologist, though this is not always the case, such as with the fictionalized Hakuzōsu, which in one version (Hyaku monogatari) kills the priest and assumes his place. In the theatrical comedy (kyōgen) version, the hunter realizes the hoax and makes the fox behave ridiculously using a bait of deep-fried mouse, and then captures the fox. (Note: So there is no grisly aftermath here of the old fox going to the temple to kill the priest.)

A common trick is to transform into a beautiful woman to beguile men. (cf. § Shape-shifters) The kitsune that initiates sexual contact may also manifest the ability to suck the life force or spirit from human beings, reminiscent of vampires or succubi.

Besides the ability to transform, the kitsune is credited with other supernatural abilities such as spiritual possession (kitsunetsuki), generating fox-fire (cf. kitsunebi and § Kitsunebi control).

Another favorite trick of the fox is to give human fake money. Paper currency turns into a leaf once inside the wallet in modern versions, or gold coinage (koban) turns to leaf in older tales. (Note: Casal compares this to European tales where the devil's money turns from gold to excrement, and adds that "since Japan is not scatologically inclined" the motif involves a leaf and not excrement. Casal misspoke here. Seki's "Leaf Money" tale type concludes: "Money turns into leaves, or he finds horse - dung inside his purse".)

The fox in fable is also famed for tricking humans into eating dumpling (dango) actually made of horse dung. This is alluded to in the novel Tōkaidōchū Hizakurige (1822) colloquially known as Yaji-Kita after the characters making the journey. In one scene, Yajirobē who "imagines that the fox has taken the shape of [Kitahachi]" refuses the mochi offered him on suspicion of it being inedible horse dung. Foxes are also accused of tricking people into taking a bath in a night soil pot (human manure pit) or a "cesspool" as Hearn puts it politely.

Tales distinguish kitsune gifts from kitsune payments. If a kitsune offers a payment or reward that includes money or material wealth, part or all of the sum will consist of old paper, leaves, twigs, stones, or similar valueless items under a magical illusion. True kitsune gifts are usually intangibles, such as protection, knowledge, or long life.

=== Shape-shifters ===
A kitsune may take on human form, an ability learned when it reaches a certain age—usually 100 years, although some tales say 50.

As a common prerequisite for the transformation, the fox must place a leaf (or reeds, weeds) or a skull over its head (cf. Kitsune zōshi picture scroll). The fox's use of skull to transform derives from China, as it is attested in Youyang zazu (9th century). It may have to run a circle around a tree three times to transform. The imagery held by present-day Japanese is that the fox will place a leaf on its head and do a flip in the air to turn into someone or some thing. The use of leaf is hard to explain, but when one examines the corpus of mukashibanashi folktales, the fox frequently stand by water (to look at the reflection of itself) transforms by placing waterweeds on its head, the weed being a sort to ersatz wig.。

Common forms assumed by kitsune include beautiful women, young girls, elderly men, and less often young boys. These shapes are not limited by the fox's own age or gender, and a kitsune can duplicate the appearance of a specific person. Kitsune are particularly renowned for impersonating beautiful women. Common belief in feudal Japan was that any woman encountered alone, especially at dusk or night, could be a kitsune. Kitsune-gao ('fox-faced') refers to human females who have a narrow face with close-set eyes, thin eyebrows, and high cheekbones. Traditionally, this facial structure is considered attractive, and some tales ascribe it to foxes in human form. Variants on the theme have the kitsune retain other foxy traits, such as a coating of fine hair, a fox-shaped shadow, or a reflection that shows its true form.

A medieval tale describes an old fox that transformed into an enormously tall sugi ("cedar") tree, but this raised the suspicion of a man who was searching for his horse; he and his minions shot the tree with arrows, and later a fox was found lying dead. (Note: Konjaku monogatari Book 27.37 「狐変大榅木被射殺語」.) (Note: "The Story of the Fox who Got Killed Assuming the Form of a Cedar Tree".)

In some stories, kitsune retain—and have difficulty hiding—their tails when they take human form; looking for the tail, perhaps when the fox gets drunk or careless, is a common method of discerning the creature's true nature. A particularly devout individual may even be able to see through a fox's disguise merely by perceiving them. Kitsune can also be exposed while in human form by their fear and hatred of dogs, and some become so rattled by their presence that they revert to the form of a fox and flee.

=== Yoshitsune story ===
In the fictional kabuki and puppet play material Yoshitsune Senbon Zakura, the premises is that a 1,000 year old mother and father foxes are hunted for their skin to span the special set of tsuzumi drum, known as the Hatsune ("first sound"). The fox kit assumes the shape of Yoshitsune's retainer Tadanobu in order to be with the drum made from its parents, or possibly to take possession of it.

=== Kitsunebi control ===
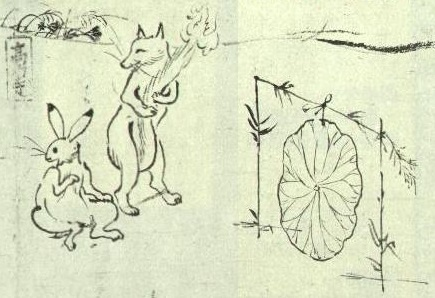
Rabbit and fox next to archery target (lotus leaf), awaiting shot. —Chōjū giga (1150s)

The kitsune was purportedly capable of firing off the kitsunebi ("fox fire") flame from their tail by stroking it, as portrayed in the Chōjū-jinbutsu-giga (fig. right), or by striking the tail against the ground. Or it might have been the kitsune's fiery breath, according to regional tradition.

The kitsune were also said to employ their kitsunebi to lead travelers astray in the manner of a will-o'-the-wisp.

== Hierarchies and Classifications of Kitsune ==
In East Asian folklore, fox spirits are frequently described as supernatural beings capable of transformation. Early Chinese sources refer to foxes with unusual or portentous characteristics, while later compilations provide more detailed accounts of their abilities and development

Accounts preserved in the ''Taiping Guangji'' (太平廣記), a Song dynasty compilation of earlier tales, describe fox spirits as acquiring transformative abilities with age, including the ability to assume human form at fifty years, increased supernatural abilities at one hundred years, and a transcendent state as a “heavenly fox” (天狐, ''tianhu'') after one thousand years.

In later East Asian traditions, fox spirits are often depicted with multiple tails, with the number of tails commonly associated with age and power. The nine-tailed fox is typically represented as the most powerful form.

In Japanese folklore, kitsune are associated with the deity Inari and are broadly classified into benevolent and malevolent types. Benevolent foxes (''zenko'') are regarded as messengers of Inari, while wild foxes (''yako'' or ''nogitsune'') are often portrayed as mischievous or harmful.

Some Edo-period texts further classify benevolent foxes into ranked categories, including ''tenko'', ''kinko'', ''ginko'', ''kuroko'', and ''byakko'', although such hierarchies vary between sources and are not consistently defined.

The distinction between ''zenko'' and ''yako'' is also discussed in Shinto scholarship, which associates benevolent foxes with Inari and regards others as independent or potentially harmful spirits.

== Spiritual possession ==
Kitsunetsuki (狐憑き, 狐付き), also written kitsune-tsuki, literally means 'the state of being possessed by a fox'. Stories of fox possession (kitsunetsuki) are widespread throughout Japan.

Stories of kitsunetsuki s have already been attested during the Heian period, and the setsuwa narrative blaming illness on a fox spirit in Nihon ryōiki can be taken as an early attestation of kitsunetsuki.

From a clinical standpoint, those possessed by a fox are thought to suffer from a mental illness or similar condition. Such illness explanations were already being published by the 19th century, but the superstition was difficult to eradicate (cf. § Edo period criticism).

The patient struck ill by the kitsunetsuki syndrome is evidently unable to speak on the kitsune spirit's mind, so that a (hired) miko exorcist temporarily takes over the possession and explains what the fox wants, as in the case of the narrative in the 11th century Uji shūi monogatari, where the fox discloses it merely craved human food. (Note: Uji shūi monogatari, Book. 4. 狐、人に憑きてしとぎ食ふ事.)

The idea of fox possession arguably became more widespread in the fifteenth century. Various learned men argued fox possession as superstition or an illness during the Edo period to no avail, the superstition persisted. Lafcadio Hearn picked up on the kitsunetsuki lore during the Meiji Era current near his adoptive home province of Izumo, even while Medical science continued to tried to debunk the myth, and the belief in fox and other animal spirit owning families regionally persisted even in the studies conducted c. 1960.

== Familiar spirits ==
There are families that tell of protective fox spirits, and in certain regions, possessions by a kuda-gitsune, osaki, yako, or hito-gitsune are also called kitsunetsuki. These families are said to have been able to use their fox to gain fortune, but marriage into such a family was considered forbidden as it would enlarge the family. They were also said to be able to bring about illness and curse the possessions, crops, and livestock of enemies. This caused them to be considered taboo by the other families, which led to societal problems.

The great amount of faith given to foxes can be seen in how, as a result of the Inari belief where foxes were believed to be Inari no Kami or its servant, they were employed in practices of dakini-ten by mikkyō and shugendō practitioners and in the oracles of miko; the customs related to kitsunetsuki can be seen as having developed in such a religious background.

== Wives and lovers ==
Kitsune are commonly portrayed as lovers, usually in stories involving a young human male and a kitsune who takes the form of a human woman. The kitsune may be a seductress, but these stories are more often romantic in nature. Typically, the young man unknowingly marries the fox, who proves a devoted wife. The man eventually discovers the fox's true nature, and the fox-wife is forced to leave him. In some cases, the husband wakes as if from a dream, filthy, disoriented, and far from home. He must then return to confront his abandoned family in shame.

=== Nihon Ryōiki ===
The earliest "fox wife" (kitsune nyōbo (狐女房)) tale type, concerning a wife whose identity as fox is revealed after being frightened by the house pet dog, (Note: Cf. Nakamura's translation of the narrative. and) occurs in Nihon Ryōiki, an anthology of Buddhist tales compiled around 822. The plotline involves a man who takes a wife, whose identity is later revealed to be a fox pretending to be a woman.

In this story, (Note: Japanese texts: Nakata tr. 1975, translation, and also Nakata tr. 1978, Old Japanese, pp. 42–43 vs. modern Japanese translation, pp. 43–45.) a man from Ōno no kōri, Mino Province (Note: Ōno no kōri means roughly "Ōno County", and now corresponds to the village of Ōno, now the town of Ōno, in Ibi District, Gifu, or rather, the eastern portion of Ibi District.) (Note: The archaic place-name is read Ōno-no-kōri (大野郡) in medieval geography. Although translated as "Ōno district", it probably should be clarified that the modern day Ōno District, Gifu (Ōno-gun) lies in the north central part of the prefecture, whereas the actual setting of the tale occurs in Ibi District, at the southwest end of the prefecture, a completely different location. Hamel's book mistook "Ono (Ōno)" to be the man's name (surname).) found and married a fox-wife, who bore a child by him. But the household dog born the same time as the baby always harassed the wife, until one day frightened her so much she transformed back into a yakan (野干), construed to mean "wild fox". (Note: The term yakan (lit. 'field-shield') comes from Buddhist scripture, and in the original context referred to a different animal, perhaps a jackal.) Although the husband and wife become separated (during the day), she fulfills the promises to come sleep with him every night, (Note: Hamel 1915, p. 89: "So every evening she stole back and slept in his arms".) hence the Japanese name of the creature, meaning "come and sleep" or "come always", according to the folk etymology presented in the tale.

Alternate versions of the fox-wife tale appeared later during the Kamakura-period in the works Mizukagami and Fusō Ryakuki of the 12th century.

The fox-wife's descendants were also depicted as doing evil things by taking advantage of their power. According to the foregoing story, the fox-wife's child became the first ancestor of the surname Kitsune-no-atae (狐直). However, in another tale from the Nihon Ryōiki, a story was told about a ruffian female descendant; the tale was also placed in the repertoire of the later work Konjaku monogatari. Here, the woman nicknamed "Mino kitsune" (Mino fox), was tall and powerful and engaged in open banditry seizing goods from merchants.

=== Abe no Seimei ===
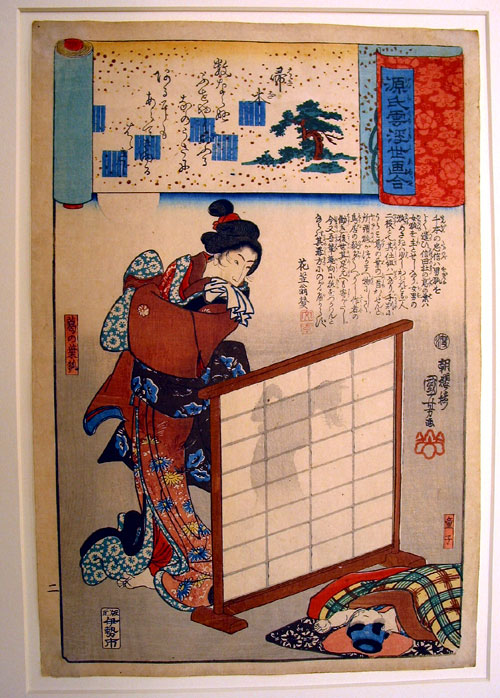
The kitsune Kuzunoha casts a fox's shadow even in human form. Kuzunoha is a popular figure in folklore and the subject of puppet and kabuki plays. Print by Utagawa Kuniyoshi.

A well-known example of the fox woman motif involves the astrologer-magician Abe no Seimei, to whom was attached a legend that he was born from a fox-woman (named Kuzunoha), and taken up in a number of works during the early modern period, commonly referred to as "Shinoda no mori" ("Shinoda Forest") material (cf. below).

The historical Abe no Seimei later developed a fictional reputation of being the scion of fox-kind, and his extraordinary powers became associated with that mixed bloodline. Seimei was purported to have been born a hybrid between the (non-historical) Abe no Yasuna, and a white fox rescued by him that gratefully assumed the shape of the widower's sister-in-law, Kuzunoha (Note: "Kuzunoha" means "leaf of kuzu or vine".) to become his wife, a piece of fantasy with the earliest known example being the Abe no Seimei monogatari printed 1662, and later adapted into puppet plays (and kabuki) bearing such titles as Shinodazuma ("The Shinoda Wife", 1678) and Ashiya Dōman ōuchi kagami ("A Courtly Mirror of Ashiya Dōman", 1734).

=== Konjaku monogatari ===
Another medieval "fox wife" tale is found in the Konjaku monogatarishū (c. 11–12th century), Book 16, tale number 17, concerning the marriage of a man named Kaya Yoshifuji, (Note: Japanese: 賀陽良藤.) but the same narrative about this man and the fox had already been written down by Miyoshi Kiyotsura (d. 919) in Zenka hiki (Note: Japanese: 善家秘記.) and quoted in the Fusō ryakki entry for the 9th month of Kanpyō 8 (Oct./Nov. 896), so it is in fact quite old. (Note: The Kaya Yoshifuji was later also included in the Buddhist historical text Genkō Shakusho (14th century), Book 29 supplement "Shūi shi 拾異志".)

=== Otogi zōshi ===
External image
- https://archive.wul.waseda.ac.jp/kosho/he12/he12_01586/he12_01586_p0011.jpg Foxes revealing transformation techniques: skull or hair clump on head, used paper, etc. ―Kitsune no sōshi. 1849 copy by Ichihara Entan (given name Morizumi) of the original by Tosa Mitsunobu. Waseda University Collection.]

Later the medieval novella Kitsune zōshi (or Kitsune no sōshi) appeared, which may be included in the Otogi-zōshi genre under the broader definition, and the Kobata-gitsune include in the 23 titles of the Otogi-zōshi "library" proper. It has also been noted that the context in Kitsune zōshi, which is no longer a fox-wife tale strictly speaking, since the man is a Buddhist monk, and though he and the bewitching fox-woman spend a night of sensuality together, he is not taking on a spouse, and he merely suffers humiliation.

One scene in Kitsune zōshi reveals the foxes caught in the act of performing transformation by placing as skull or human hair on its head (cf. image right).

=== Tamamo-no-mae ===
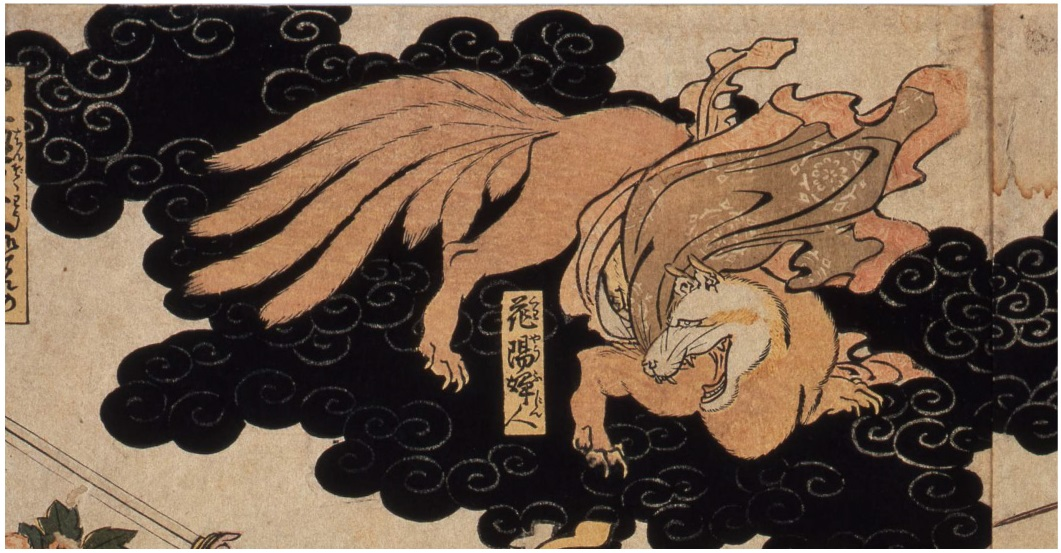
Nine-tails. Tamomo, previously as Kayō fujin to King Hanzoku of India (shown below). —Detail, Hokusai (1807)} Sangoku yōkoden

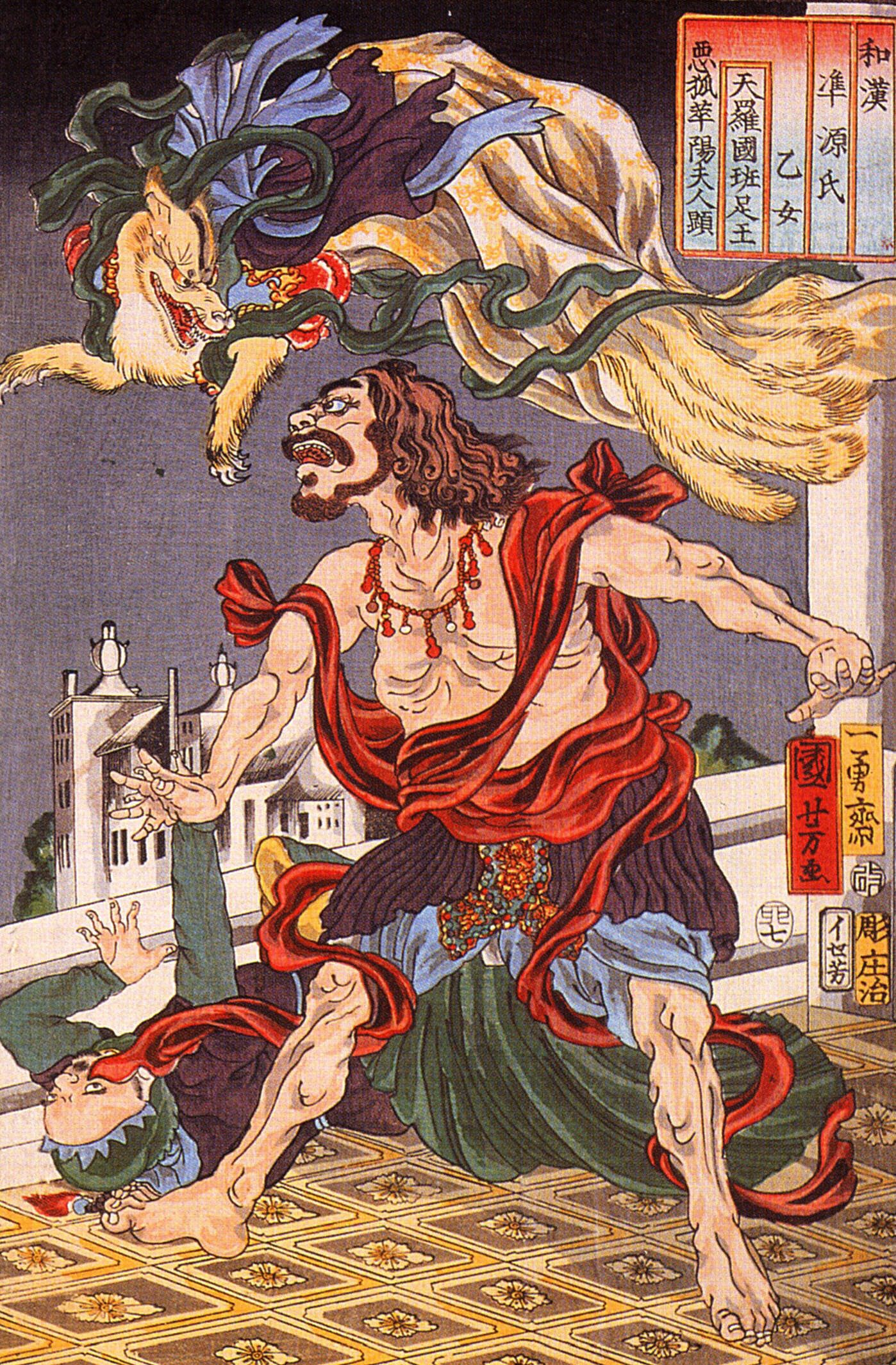
A nine-tailed fox spirit (kyūbi no kitsune) scaring King Hanzoku (Kalmashapada of India); print by Utagawa Kuniyoshi, Edo period, 19th century

The story about the Lady Tamamo-no-Mae developed in the 14th century, claiming that the vixen captivated the Emperor Konoe (reigned 1141–1155). This was a truly ancient nine-tailed fox, since two thousand years before that, she had been queen-consort Daji to King Zhou of Yin/Shang (Japanese: In no Chū-ō (殷の紂王)), bringing about the downfall of the dynasty. allowing the Western Zhou dynasty to come into being, only to cause its fall too by assuming the persona of the concubine Bao Si and seducing its last emperor.

After fleeing from Shang dynasty China, she was 花陽婦人 (Kayō fujin) consort named serving King Hanzoku (Kalmashapada of India (cf. figure right below).

=== Takeda Shingen ===
Stephen Turnbull, in Nagashino 1575, relates the tale of the Takeda clan's involvement with a fox-woman. The warlord Takeda Shingen, in 1544, defeated in battle a lesser local warlord named Suwa Yorishige and drove him to suicide after a "humiliating and spurious" peace conference, after which Shingen forced marriage on Suwa Yorishige's beautiful 14-year-old daughter Lady Koi—Shingen's own niece. Shingen, Turnbull writes, "was so obsessed with the girl that his superstitious followers became alarmed and believed her to be an incarnation of the white fox-spirit of the Suwa Shrine, who had bewitched him in order to gain revenge." When their son Takeda Katsuyori proved to be a disastrous leader and led the clan to their devastating defeat at the battle of Nagashino, Turnbull writes, "wise old heads nodded, remembering the unhappy circumstances of his birth and his magical mother".

=== Edo Period ===
Edo Period scholar Hayashi Razan's Honchō jinja kō ("Study of the Shrines of our Country", 1645) records the lore concerning a man from the Tarui clan, who wedded a fox and begot the historical Tarui Gen'emon.

=== Ancestral lines ===
A number of stories of this type tell of fox-wives bearing children. When such progeny are human, they possess special physical or supernatural qualities that often pass to their own children.

As aforementioned, the fox wife in the Nihon ryōiki tale gave rise to the ancestral line of the Kitsune-no-atae clan, and a woman of great strength named "Mino kitsune" belonged to that heritage.

== Kitsune no yomeiri ==
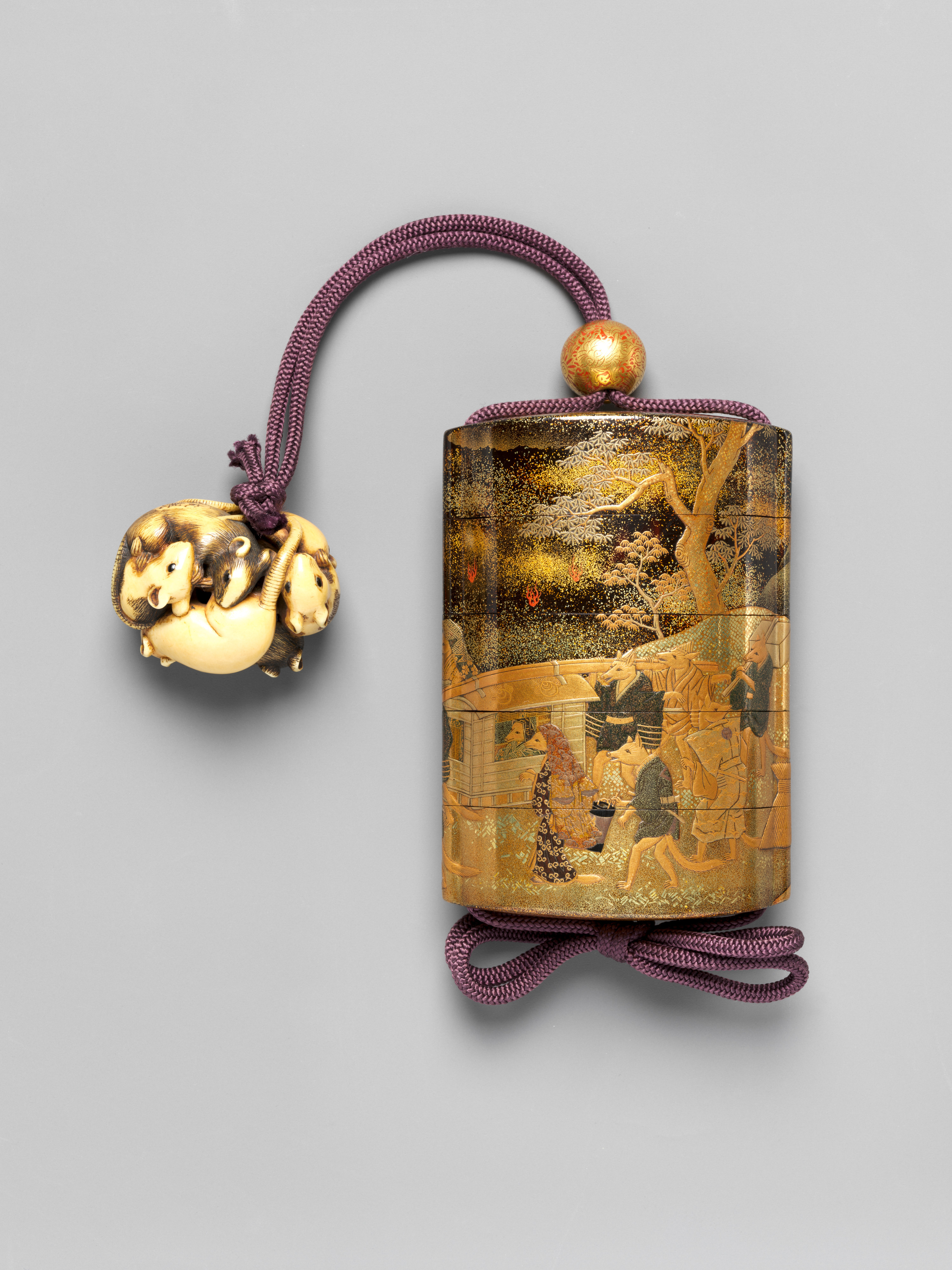
Inro depicting the kitsune no yomeiri. The reverse side depicting the bride in a litter.

Other stories tell of kitsune marrying one another. Rain falling from a clear sky—a sunshower—is called kitsune no yomeiri or the kitsune's wedding, in reference to a folktale describing a wedding ceremony between the creatures being held during such conditions. The event is considered a good omen, but the kitsune will seek revenge on any uninvited guests, as is depicted in the 1990 Akira Kurosawa film Dreams.

== Fox jewel ==
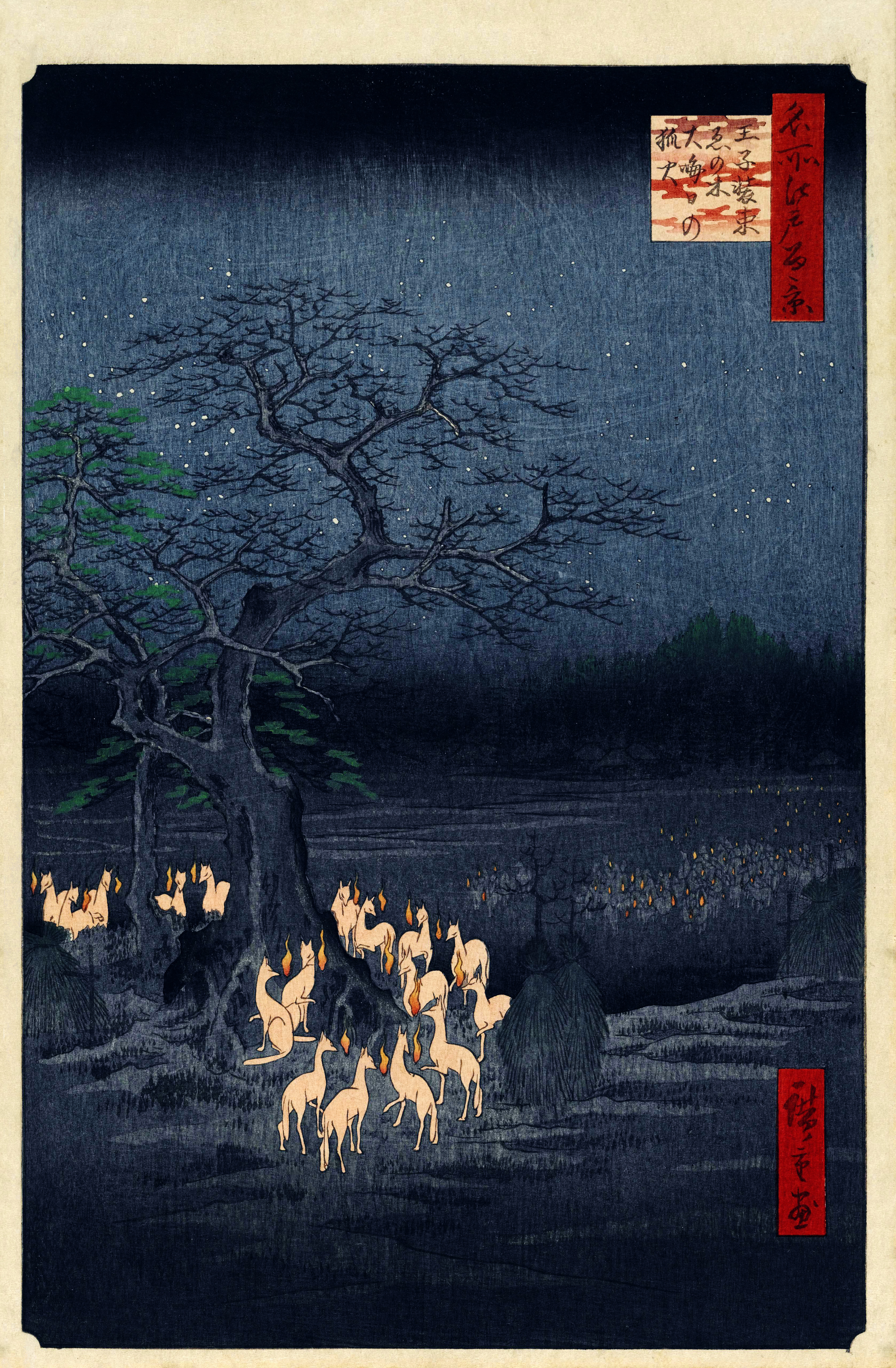
"Kitsunebi on New Year's Night under the Enoki Tree near Ōji" in the One Hundred Famous Views of Edo by Hiroshige. Each fox has a kitsunebi floating close to its face.

There is the notion that the kitsune is in possession of a supernatural luminous jewel or tama lodged in their tail (or possibly kept externally), while in the Chinese version the mythical fox has a special jewel or pearl embedded inside its heart. The jewel on the tail tip is also depicted in Buddhist temple art. (Note: Where the fox is the mount on which the goddess Dakini rides.)

A fox's jewel is described as a round white object the size of a small mandarin orange (Note: Probably considerably smaller than mandarin orange. The text reads shōkōji (小柑子) prefixed "small". The "big" or ōkōji is today's koji orange (thin-skinned mikan), while the "small" shōkōji is today's tachibana orange or evern kumquat according to one explanation.) in a tale from the Konjaku monogatarishū compilation (12th century). The miko (female "exorcist") acting as spiritual medium for the fox is playing with it, (Note: The exorcist bit is lost in translation, and replaced by the patient possessed by the fox in, e.g., Nozaki's text.) and a samurai snatches it away. (Note: This fox in this tale obfuscates on what the function of the jewel might be. The focus is on the fox's gratefulness, the moral being: humans ought to act as honorably as such mere critters). The kitsune(inhabiting the exorcist) begs for its return, and promises to become the samurai's guardian spirit. The fox later honors the pact by leading the man out of harm's way past a band of armed robbers.)

It is held that the fox jewel is necessary for the fox to change shape, or use its magical power. Another tradition is that the pearl represents the kitsune's soul; the kitsune will die if separated from it for too long.

An anecdote is recorded in the 18th century, which purports that an actual fox jewel was stolen from the creatures by several temple samurai, causing the temple's high priest (sōjō, "bishop") distress, prompting its return to the foxes. The stone flashed kitsunebi fire according to the account. (Note: This occurrence purportedly took place at Chikurin-in (竹林院) in Ōmi Province. It was communicated to author Kiuchi by his brother named Yoshitake (義武) who served as samurai at that temple.) (Note: Kiuchi Sekitei (1779), Second Part of Unkonshi (雲根志)}, Book 1, p. 26.) (Note: "The Fox Fire Returned by a Bishop".)

The fox jewel was frequently discussed under the name of 宝珠の玉 (hōju no tama; 'treasure-gem jewel', "cintamani") in the post-medieval period, and stories about hōshi no tama (ホーシの玉) is common in the popular telling (recorded oral literature), which often speaks of such stone or tufty object being found or acquired and given over to the custody of a temple, etc., to be enshrined. (Note: The meaning of hōshi written phonetically in kana is ambiguous. It has been redacted as hōshi no tama (法師の玉; 'priest jewel') on Oki Islands, or hoshi no tama (星の玉; 'star jewel') in Miyagi Prefecture.)

(Cf. § Iconography).

== Iconography ==
In traditional art, the white fox or byakko has been a favorite theme into the Meiji era.

And the phosphorescent fox is not only depicted with the kitsune-bi fire floating above their heads, but with a luminous jewel (tama) at its tail tip, which Lafcadio Hearn surmises is the same tama from Buddhism (cf. Mani Jewel and § Fox jewel).

Fox Jewels are a common symbol of Inari and representations of sacred Inari foxes without them are rare.

In the Buddhist context, the fox is standardly depicted as the creature on which the goddess Dakini rides. The luminous jewel is depicted on the fox's tail.

== Chinese parallels ==
Folktales from China tell of fox spirits called húli jīng (Chinese: 狐狸精) also known as nine-tailed fox (Chinese: 九尾狐) that may have up to nine tails. These fox spirits were adopted into Japanese culture through merchants as kyūbi no kitsune (九尾の狐; (lit. 'nine-tailed fox')).

The earliest "fox wife" (kitsune nyōbo (狐女房)) tale type in Japan in Nihon Ryōiki (Cf. § Wives and lovers) bears close resemblance to the Tang dynasty Chinese story Renshi zhuan ("The Story of Lady Ren", c. 800), (Note: Renshi zhuan (任氏傳, Japanese: Ninshiden. This story of "Miss Ren" belongs in the chuanqi genre, and according to Nakata, it emphasizes human emotions like the Japanese Nihon Ryōiki tale, in contrast to the fox wife tale in Soushen ji (搜神記;; "In Search of the Supernatural"), which is classed in the earlier Zhiguai genre.) (Note: The Chinese wife or concubine (Lady Ren or Lady Jen) also exposes her fox identity after being barked at by a dog,) and the possibility has been suggested that this is a remake of the Chinese version. (Note: The legend of Miss Ren known in Japan to Ōe no Masafusa (11–12th cent.) who mentioned two classical Chinese instances in his Kobiki (cf. infra)) (Note: Takeshi Nakano apud Nagata 1980, p. 84) A composite fashioned from the confluence of Tang dynasty wonder tales (chuanqi genre, as exemplified by the Renshi zhuan) and earlier wonder tales (Zhiguai genre) has also been proposed. (Note: Akinori Maruyama apud Iguro 2005, p. 2)

The trope of the fox as femme fatale in Japanese literature also originates from China. Ōe no Masafusa (d. 1111) in Kobiki or Kobi no ki (狐眉記; A record of fox spirits) (Note: Masafusa borrowed the term kobi (Chinese pronunciation: humei) makes reference to seductive fox spirits, though he altered the meaning somewhat. The original Chinese meaning refers specifically to foxes that transform into beautiful women.) The femme fatale vixen was the mult-millenarian Tamamo-no-mae who was queen-consort during the Yin/Shang dynasty of China according to the fantastic tale.

== Foxes in Japanese archaeology ==
Foxes and humans lived close together in ancient Japan; this companionship gave rise to legends about the creatures.

The oldest relationship between the Japanese people and the fox dates back to the Jomon period necklace made by piercing the canine teeth and jawbone of the fox.

== In popular culture ==
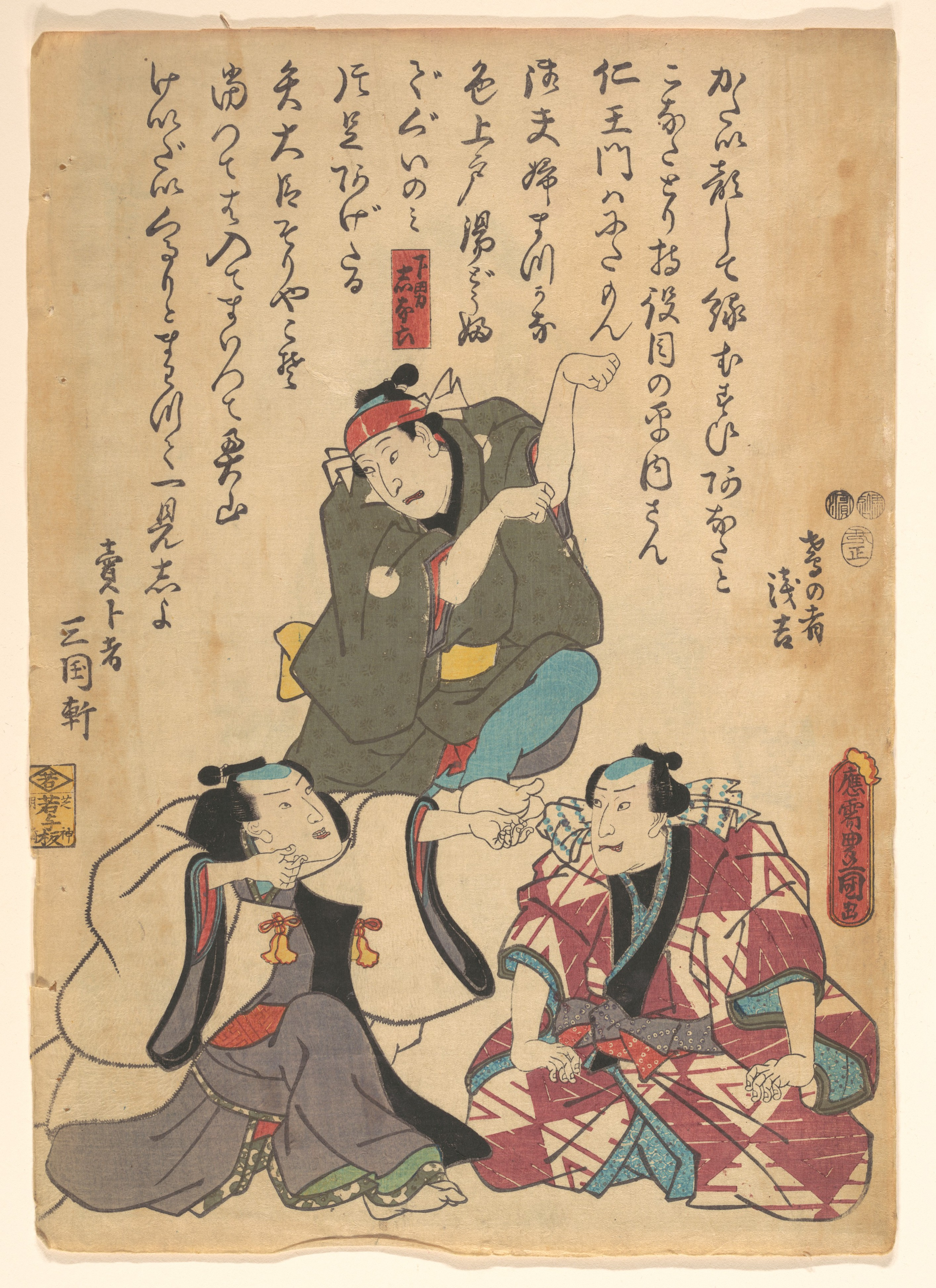
Top: Fox paws gesture; Left: Hunter holding rifle gesture; Right: Village headman's hands on knees gesture

A traditional game called kitsune-ken ('fox-fist') references the kitsune's powers over human beings. The game is similar to rock paper scissors, but the three hand positions signify a fox, a hunter, and a village headman. The headman beats the hunter, whom he outranks; the hunter beats the fox, whom he shoots; the fox beats the headman, whom he bewitches.

In the popular manga and anime series Naruto, the protagonist Naruto Uzumaki has a nine-tailed fox, also called kyubi or Kurama, sealed inside him, which he uses in combat. Beginning in Super Mario 3D Land (2011), the playable character Luigi can collect a power-up known as the Super Leaf to transform into Kitsune Luigi.

Japanese metal idol band Babymetal refer to the kitsune myth in their lyrics and include the use of fox masks, hand signs, and animation interludes during live shows.

== See also ==
- Fox spirit, a general overview about this being in East Asian folklore
  - Huli jing – a Chinese fox spirit
  - Kumiho – a Korean fox spirit
  - Hồ ly tinh – a Vietnamese fox spirit
- Foxes in popular culture, films and literature
- Hakuzōsu
- Reynard the Fox – Cycle of medieval, allegorical, Flemish fable
- The Sacred Book of the Werewolf
- The Sandman: The Dream Hunters
- Sessho-seki
- Tamamo-no-Mae
- Wild fox koan
