= Tanukitsuki =

Tanukitsuki (狸憑き (たぬきつき) or 狸憑; lit. "Tanuki possession") is the possession of a human by the spirit of a tanuki (Japanese raccoon dog). In ancient Japanese shamanism, it is a type of psychic phenomenon considered to exist.

While widely transmitted in Shikoku and Sado Island, many legends also exist in Aomori Prefecture, Iwate Prefecture, and Okayama Prefecture, with folklore found throughout Japan. It is also known as mujina (ムジナ), mamedanuki (豆狸), and tomakko (トマッコ).

== Overview ==
The symptoms of being possessed by a tanuki vary, but it is often said that the victim becomes gluttonous. In particular, there is a tendency to crave Sekihan (or Azuki bean rice). It is said that because the nutritional value of the food is stolen by the tanuki, the victim becomes debilitated and eventually dies, conversely to their abdomen which swells up. Additionally, victims are said to exhibit abnormal behaviors such as unexplained illnesses, states of depression or loquaciousness, committing violence without reason, engaging in sexual misconduct, eating rotted things, speaking strange things, or crawling on all fours.

Most causes of tanukitsuki stem from grudges held by tanuki after humans play pranks on them or destroy their nests. It is said that this is known because those who successfully escaped possession thanks to the prayers of Onmyōji or Shugendō practitioners (Yamabushi) tell of it after regaining their senses. Other legends suggest tanuki possess offerings of fish, alcohol, or sekihan at festivals (or gifts) and possess people through these connections, or that they possess people who are absent-minded or women who have bought beautiful kimonos.

While the concept of "Tsukimono-suji" (a lineage or family line that holds possessing spirits), which is specific to possessing entities, is rare for tanukitsuki, there are instances of tanuki spirits attached to specific lineages. Examples include Oyotsu-san transmitted in Takamatsu, Kagawa Prefecture, and the Nabesoko or Tomako-danuki (Note: These are said to be part of the Weasel family, about 15cm in length, and form groups, rather than being standard tanuki. It is said they primarily possess housewives; if kept well, the house becomes wealthy, but if not, the house immediately becomes poor.) transmitted in the Mimasaka region of Okayama Prefecture. Also, though rare, it is said in Kagawa Prefecture that a person who has fed and tamed an old tanuki can direct it to possess a hated adversary and cause them harm. There are many shrines dedicated to tanuki in Shikoku; this is purportedly because it is believed that if a tanuki is elevated to a god, it can no longer possess people, so they are intentionally enshrined as deities.

For exorcism (referred to as Tanuki-otoshi or "dropping the tanuki"), it is common to request incantations and prayers from ascetics or Yamabushi (called Hōin-sama), but the methods vary by region. Methods include: exchanging a vow prohibiting possession with the tanuki spirit through the Yamabushi's sutra chanting; offering azuki rice to the tanuki's original dwelling; the Yamabushi burning a Goma fire and causing the spirit to possess a medium (Note: Called a "Yuri", they are blindfolded with white cloth and hold a Gohei. They stay by the side of the recumbent possessed person. From a tale in the vicinity of Ichinomiya, Takamatsu, Kagawa Prefecture.) to accept the tanuki's demands; smoking it out with green cedar leaves; smoking it out with chili peppers; firing blank gunshots; beating drums; and in the late Shōwa era, electric shocks by doctors have also been observed. Some traditions state that (unlike foxes) tanuki are stupid and stubborn, making them difficult to separate from the victim, causing much suffering.

== Strange tales ==
=== Possession of the dead by Tanuki ===
Miyazaki Narumi, who was a shogunate retainer (Kobito-gashira, later Mochiyumi-no-gashira) in the late Edo period, was engaged in the compilation business of the Edo Shogunate. The miscellaneous records titled Mikikigusa (178 volumes in total), which Narumi compiled over 30 years starting around the 13th year of Bunsei (1830), record various events such as politics, incidents, and disasters. It also contains many ghost stories and strange tales, one of which is a story of "Tanuki no Shibito-tsuki," or "a tanuki possessing a dead person." The story is as follows:

In the 3rd month of Bunsei 11 (April or May 1828 (Note: The 1st and 30th (last day) of the 3rd month of Bunsei 11 in the Tenpō calendar correspond to April 14 and May 13, 1828, in the Western calendar (Gregorian calendar).)), an old woman named Yachi, who was serving at a mansion in Edo, suddenly fainted. When she recovered a few hours later, she had lost the use of her limbs, but her appetite increased tenfold, and she began to sing cheerfully. When the anxious master of the house had a doctor examine her, Yachi had no pulse, and the doctor could only call it a strange disease. Eventually, Yachi's body became emaciated, holes opened up in her body, and something hairy could be seen inside. After autumn passed, when her clothes were removed to dress her in winter clothing, a massive amount of animal-like fur was found adhering to the garments. The figure of a tanuki began to appear by her pillow, and from a certain night onwards, piles of kaki (persimmons) and Mochi were placed by her bedside. Yachi claimed they were gifts brought by visitors. Although Yachi was supposed to be illiterate, she would write waka poems on paper with her disabled hands. Yachi's appetite gradually increased, flattening 7 to 9 bowls of rice every meal, and several dumplings and dozens of Kintsuba (sweet bean paste cakes) after every meal. Finally, on the 2nd day of the 11th month of the same year (December 8, 1828), the figure of the Amida Sanzon (Amida Triad) appeared in Yachi's room, and a scene of them taking Yachi away was seen. An old tanuki slipped out of Yachi's body and left, and Yachi's remaining body turned into a corpse. A tanuki appeared in the dream of the young maidservant who had cared for Yachi to thank her, and when the maid awoke, a gold cup had been left as a token of gratitude.

=== The Lord Tanuki of Asakusa ===
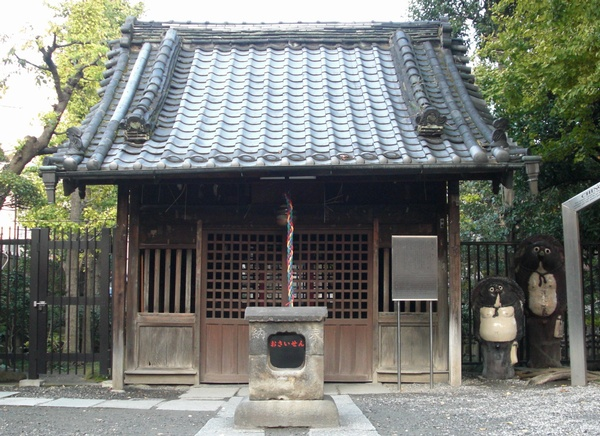
Chingodō Hall at Sensō-ji. The main image of this hall is not inside the hall but enshrined in the garden of the Demboin located in the back. Perhaps in its place, two Shigaraki ware tanuki statues are placed beside the hall.

In the early Meiji period, many tanuki lost their habitats due to the development of the Sensō-ji temple lands (located in present-day Taitō, Tokyo). These tanuki committed various acts of violence against humans and eventually possessed the daughter of the temple's steward, blurting out, "I am the Asakusa Tanuki." The family tried various methods to drive the tanuki out, but they were ineffective. Triggered by an oracle received by the Great Archbishop Yuiga Shoshun and others stating, "If you enshrine us, we will become the guardians of the temple," these tanuki came to be enshrined as tanuki gods, passed down to later generations as the Chingodō hall.

=== Tanuki possession and murder ===
In 1958 (Shōwa 33), an injury resulting in death incident caused by the folk belief of tanukitsuki, known as the "Incantation and Prayer Incident" (Kaji Kitō Jiken), occurred.

In 1979 (Shōwa 54), when strange tales of apparitions and monsters were thought to be superstitions of the distant past, a man in his 20s (Note: In Shunichi Karasawa's book Karuto no Izumi: Okaruto to Ryōki Jiken (Million Publishing, 2008, ISBN 978-4-8130-2092-9), the victim is described as a woman, but this is an error; the victim was actually male.) was killed in Ashikita, Ashikita District, Kumamoto Prefecture. The victim had begun running a high fever and speaking incoherent words in March of that year, leading him to resign from his job and start recuperating at home. When his mother consulted a prayer healer, she was told, "A tanuki has possessed him." In May of the same year, regarding the man who repeated eccentric behaviors, the four family members—parents, older sister, and younger brother—discussed that "the only way to drive out the tanuki is to beat it out." The younger brother held the man down while the father and sister continued to beat him for three hours, resulting in the man's death. These four family members were arrested on an emergency basis the same month on suspicion of injury resulting in death. Non-fiction writer Zenji Rakugawa points out that there is no trace of the prayer healer who gave the diagnosis of possession having performed any treatment to remove the spirit. He states that the truth of this incident may be that a prayer healer with little knowledge of possession gave an irresponsible diagnosis, and the family who believed it performed a removal ritual they had heard of somewhere.

== See also ==
- Kitsunetsuki (Fox possession)
- Bake-danuki
