= Yegan =

Creature in Buddhist scripture and Japanese folklore

Yěgān (野干; Japanese: yakan) is a wild beast that appears in classical Chinese translations of Buddhist texts. It is also written as Shègān (Chinese: 射干; pinyin: Shègān; Japanese: Shakan), Àn (Chinese: 豻; pinyin: Àn; Japanese: Gan or Kan), and Yě'àn (Chinese: 野犴; pinyin: Yě'àn; Japanese: Yakan) (Note: The character Àn (犴) refers to a type of wild dog, but is also applied to foxes and jackals.). It is depicted as a cunning beast. While it is described as an unidentified beast resembling a fox in China, in Japan the term is often used as a synonym for the fox itself.

== Overview ==
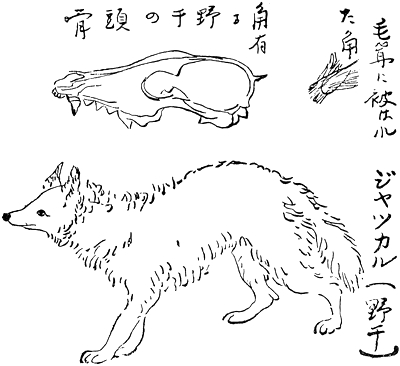
Illustration of a "Jackal (Yakan)" from Minakata Kumagusu's Junishi Kō (Thoughts on the Twelve Zodiac).

According to the Tang dynasty text Bencao Shiyi (Supplement to Materia Medica), "There are Yakan in Buddhist sutras. This is an evil beast, greenish-yellow in color, resembling a dog. It eats humans and is good at climbing trees." The Song dynasty text Fanyi Mingyi Ji (Collection of Translated Names and Meanings) states, "It resembles a fox but is smaller in shape; it travels in packs and howls at night like a wolf." The Zhengzitong (Correct Character Mastery) states, "The Àn (豻) is a barbarian dog. It resembles a fox, is black, eats tigers and leopards, and is feared by hunters."

=== True identity ===
The word is originally a transliteration of the Sanskrit word śṛgāla (शृगाल), rendered as Yěgān (野干; Japanese: Yakan) when Indian Buddhist texts were translated into Chinese. It was also transliterated as Xīqiéluó (悉伽羅; Japanese: Shitsushigara), Yègān (射干; Japanese: Shakan), and Yègān (夜干; Japanese: Yakan).

Originally, this animal referred to the jackal in India (specifically the Golden jackal distributed across Eurasia; the name "jackal" also derives from the Sanskrit śṛgāla). However, because the jackal did not inhabit China, confusion occurred, and it was conflated with the fox, the marten (ten), and the dhole (chai; a wild dog that resembles a fox). In Japan, the term came to primarily refer to the fox itself. (Note: Even in Japan, the Heian period text Honzō Wamyō contains the sentence, "The Chai (dhole/wolf), skin is used; one name is Yakan, the Japanese name is Ookami (wolf)," showing confusion with dholes and wolves. Furthermore, some Edo period literature explains Yakan and foxes as separate beasts.) regarding indigenous canids in India, the Bengal fox and the dhole exist, and their diets and habitats compete with the jackal.

In India, the jackal was known as an inauspicious beast that roamed Śmaśāna (charnel grounds) (Note: Śmaśāna (Japanese: Shirin) refers to forests where corpses were cremated or abandoned. Bodies left exposed or partially burnt became food for birds and beasts.) to steal offerings and eat corpses. Consequently, it became a symbol for goddesses who reside in charnel grounds, such as Kali and Chamunda (one of the Matrikas, or Seven Mothers, who is an emanation of Durga). In Indian Buddhism, the Yakan was also considered a retinue member of the Seven Mothers of Yama. (Note: Chamunda (Japanese: Shamonda), the head of the Seven Mothers of Yama, is a transliteration of Chamunda. Unlike her appearance in India, in China and Japan she is depicted with the head of a wild boar.)

In 1910 (Meiji 43), the naturalist and folklorist Minakata Kumagusu published an article in the Tokyo Journal of Anthropology stating that the Yakan in Chinese Buddhist texts was a phonetic transcription of the Sanskrit śṛgāla (English: Jackal; Arabic: Chaghāl).

=== Japan ===
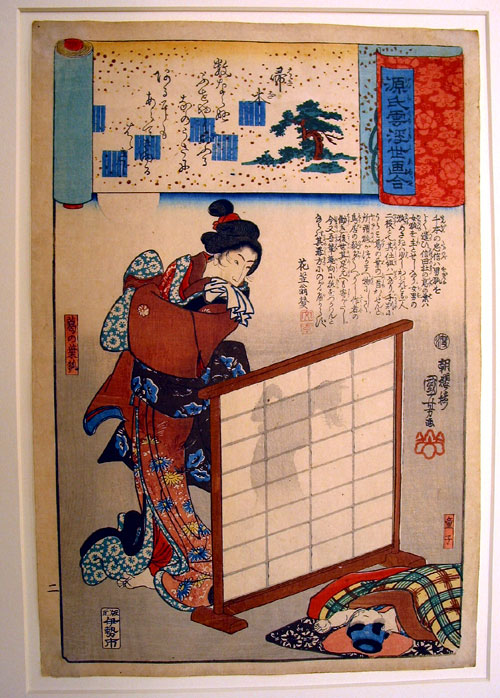
Shadow of a Yakan cast on a screen. Utagawa Kuniyoshi (Circa 1846).

In Japan, the term was initially used as a synonym for "fox" primarily among the intellectual class, including Buddhist monks and Onmyōdō practitioners. The Nihon Ryōiki (Vol. 1, Tale 2: "On the Fox Who Took a Human Wife and Begot a Child"), dating from the early Heian period, contains the tale explaining the etymology of the word "Kitsune." In the story, a fox transforms into a human woman, marries a man, and has a child, but when her true form is revealed, the man says "Come and sleep" (Kitsu-ne), giving rise to the name. Within this text, instances where the fox is written as "Yakan" can be confirmed.

The Shūgaishō mentions "Yakan-naki Kikyō" (Yakan Crying Fortune), describing divination based on the cries of foxes. The Kamakura period historical chronicle Azuma Kagami records an incident where the whereabouts of a famous sword became unknown due to a Yakan (fox) (dated May 14, 1201 Kennin 1). From the Edo period onward, the word Yakan was used generally in books and other media as a synonym for fox. Additionally, Yakan appears as an alternate name for the fox in folktales from various regions.

However, Herbalism texts such as the Yamato Honzō cite Chinese theories stating, "The shape is small, the tail is large. It climbs trees well. The fox is large in shape." Because of the size difference, these texts posit that the fox and the Yakan are different creatures.

In Japanese Esoteric Buddhism, Dakini (Dakini-ten), a female demon in the retinue of Enma-ten (Yama), was interpreted as an incarnation of the Yakan. (Note: For example, some rituals in the Tendai school switch from referring to Dakini to referring to Yakan halfway through.) From the Heian period onward, Dakini-ten was depicted riding a Yakan (fox). This interpretation of Dakini-ten, unique to Japan, eventually merged with Inari due to the deity's benefits of bringing fertility and fortune, as well as the association with riding a fox (Yakan). Furthermore, it combined with Tengu worship to give birth to deities such as Izuna Gongen, Akiba Gongen, and the Guhin.

In Noh theater, Noh masks representing fox spirits are called "Yakan." They are used in plays featuring foxes, such as Sesshōseki (The Killing Stone) and Kokaji. The role name of the fox in Sesshō-seki is also noted as "Spirit of Yakan."

== Footnotes ==
Notes

== See also ==
- Yako (Wild Fox) – Has been used almost synonymously with Yakan to mean fox.
- Anubis – An Egyptian god with the head of a jackal.
