= Honey Creek, Iowa =

Honey Creek, Iowa may refer to the following settlements in Iowa:

- Honey Creek Township, Delaware County, Iowa
- Honey Creek Township, Iowa County, Iowa
- Honey Creek, Pottawattamie County, Iowa
