= Kitsunetsuki =

State of possession by a fox in Japanese folklore

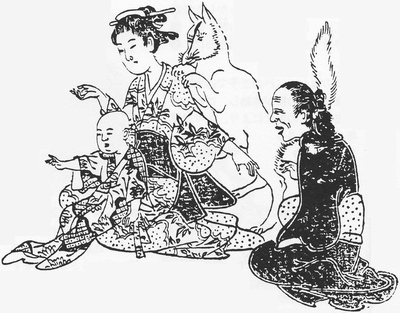
A depiction of a kitsunetsuki in the Gyokuzan Gafu by Okada Gyokuzan

Kitsunetsuki (狐憑き, 狐付き), also written kitsune-tsuki, literally means "the state of being possessed by a fox". The victim is usually said to be a young woman, whom the fox enters beneath her fingernails or through her breasts. In some cases, the victims' facial expressions are said to change in such a way that they resemble those of a fox.

Though foxes in folklore can possess a person of their own will, kitsunetsuki is often attributed to the malign intents of hereditary fox employers.

Stories of fox possession (kitsunetsuki) can be found in all lands of Japan, as part of its folk religion. Stories of kitsunetsuki have already been attested during the Heian period. (Note: illness causing fox spirit in Nihon ryōiki (9th century), identified as.)

From a clinical standpoint, those possessed by a fox are thought to suffer from a mental illness or similar condition. Such illness explanations were already being published by the 19th century, but the superstition was difficult to eradicate. (cf. § Edo period criticism)

== Heian period ==
The belief in kitsunetsuki dates back to the Heian Period. (Note: The diary of Fujiwara no Sanesuke (d. 1046), recording that the priestess of Ise Grand Shrine was purportedly possessed.) The attribution of illness to evil fox spirit is already attested in Nihon ryōiki ("Miraculous Stories", 9th century), hence folk belief in kitsunetsuki dates at least as far back as this.

=== Early three foxes ritual ===
Another piece of evidence that fox possession must have already been firmly been entrenched some time after the introduction the esoteric of mikkyō Buddhism in the 9th century was that the esoteric Buddhist liturgy Rokujikyō (六字経法; 'Ritual of the Sutra of the Six Letters Formula') for removing spiritual possession (or at least fox-caused illness) involved creating the effigies of the "three foxes", namely chiko (地狐; 'earth fox' or 'fox'), tenko (天狐; 'sky or celestial fox' or 'bird'), and hitogata (人形; 'human doll') out of dough and swallowing the burnt ash. (Note: Nakamura points out that the avian soul-possessor, actually a kite being called a "celestial fox" (tenko) further indicates how much the "fox" was the stereotypical soul-possessing creature. The term celestial fox as used in China had a different meaning, a supernatural evolution of an aged fox, which Nakamura notes also. It is pointed out that the terms tenko "celestial fox" and tengu "celestial dog" were once often mixed up, and a work as late as the Ainōshō (1445) states the same. The tengu or rather karasutengu are familiarly depicted as winged or birdlike.) (Note: The hitogata in the context of onmyōdō normally thought of as being a "paper figurine" (cf. Rappo 2023, p. 43), but Lomi points out that the "flour, poison, juice" mixture was plausibly used, though not explicit in the Ritual text. Nakamura states the material as men (麺) which nowadays may mean "noodle" but archaically can be read as "wheat flour" (mugiko), hence "dough".) A related work Byakuhōshō (13th cent.) calls the three foxes celestial fox, terrestrial fox, and jinko (人狐; 'man fox'), and refers to them as the three "obstacles" (rāhula) (Note: Chōen (澄円) (c.1278–87) Byakuhōshō (白宝抄), Book 51: "天狐はトビの形也。地狐はキツネの形也。人狐は女人形也。これ天地人の障礙「神形也」")

=== Hungry fox ===
It is said that when a fox possesses a person, it does so in order to satiate hunger, a craving for more delicacy or gourmet food, or it may harbor a desire to be worshiped. The possessed person often cannot articulate what the fox's motives or wishes are, so the possession is taken over by a miko exorcist temporarily, who can speak on behalf of the devil. Such is the turn of events in works such as Uji Shūi Monogatari. (Note: Uji Shūi Monogatari, Book. 4. 狐、人に憑きてしとぎ食ふ事.)

== Muromachi and Edo period ==
The idea of fox possession arguably became more widespread in the fifteenth century.

The rational explanation as an illness had already appeared in print in the work Jinko benwaku dan (人狐弁惑談; 'Discourse on the clarification of misunderstandings about the man-fox') (1818). But the superstition would persistently remain entrenched in the populace for many more years.

== Persisting superstition ==
=== Izumo area ===
A ninko ("man-fox") according to Lafcadio Hearn is a fox spirit, apparently smaller than the usual fox (no larger than a weasel) except its tail being like a normal full-sized fox's. It is invisible so cannot be detected until it takes possession of some human. Actually the ninko is considered to be kept by the kitsune-mochi, i.e., families gossiped to own and control a fox that can possess, gaining success via that power.

==== Ninko ====
The ninko (or jinko) is actually a regional term, only spoken of commonly (outside of literature) in the region where Hearn resided, Izumo (now Shimane Prefecture), the neighboring Hōki (now part of Tottori Prefecture). (Note: The Izumo and Hōki Provinces are named in the full title of Jinko benwaku dan which tries to explode the fox possession myth. These provinces occurred within what is now called the San'in region (Note: Northern half of Chugoku, facing the Seas of Japan.) is the honba (≈the capital) of the ninko myth according to Teiri Nakamura.) The associate lore of kitsunemochi or "fox owning" families is sporadic throughout Japan, but prevalent in the western portion of the former Izumo province.

It was in this central San'in region where gossip about certain families being ninko-havers (ninko-mochi or kitsune-mochi) got started. According to the work Izumo kokunai jinko monogatari (出雲国内人狐物語) (1786), (Note: By Yamane Yoemon (山根与右衛門).) the very concept of "kitsune-mochi" arose around the early Kyōhō era (c. 1710s), in the wake of conflict between the landlord peasant (Note: funō (富農; lit. 'wealthy peasant'), sometimes glossed as kulak.) and his sharecroppers, where resentment toward the landlord's sanctions resulted in the spreading of the vicious rumor.

However Seiroku Kuramitsu (倉光清六) (with ties to folklorist Kunio Yanagita) asserted that a suitably educated person, almost certainly a hōin (法印) (shugendō trained yamabushi of high status) who was well versed enough in fox superstition matters to know the jargon jinko/ninko to informed the peasantry. Before that, the spirit was probably called gedō as in other regions. Also, one simply needs to juxtapose "fox" with the stock phrase ten chi jin sansai (天地人三才; lit. 'heaven, earth, people, the 3 causalities', meaning all phenomena in the world)) to arrive at tenko, chiko, jinko/ninko or the heavenly, earthly, and man-fox.

What the Izumo folk call ninko or kitsune-mochi parallels the inugami ("dog spirit") of the neighboring Iwami Province and Oki islands. (Shimane Prefecture). (Note: Former Izumo, Iwami, and Oki provinces are now part of Shimane Prefecture. The inugami is also known elsewhere, in parts of Shikoku.) The inugami was also known as tōhyō (Note: Inoue says the tōhyō name derives from the lore that the spirit was stored in earthenware jars called dobin (土瓶; lit. 'earth bottle') apparently pronounced tōhyō in slang.) though tōbyō is usually considered a serpent familial spirit.

==== Kitsune-mochi benefits and stigma ====
Other kitsune use their magic for the benefit of their companion or hosts as long as the humans treat them with respect. As yōkai, however, kitsune do not share human morality, and a kitsune who has adopted a house in this manner may, for example, bring its host money or items that it has stolen from the neighbors. Accordingly, common households thought to harbor kitsune (kitsune-mochi, or "fox-havers") are "shunned". Oddly, samurai families were often reputed to share similar arrangements with kitsune, but these foxes were considered zenko and the use of their magic a sign of prestige.

=== Exorcism ===
Attempting to rid someone of a fox spirit was done via an exorcism, sometimes perhaps at an Inari shrine, but usually through visit by a miko (female shaman, nominally or actually a Shinto priestess) or a yamabushi trained in shugendō. (Note: Hearn also gives hōin (法印) but he explains it to be just a yamabushi of higher rank. This has been explained as just a local name in Izumo for a training shugendō practitioner.)

The miko will first transfer the fox spirit from the patient to herself, as in the medieval tale described under § Hungry fox

If a priest was not available or if the exorcism failed, alleged victims of kitsunetsuki might be badly burned or beaten in hopes of driving out the fox spirits. The whole family of someone thought to be possessed might be ostracized by their community.

=== Self-induced possession ===
A miko or itako purports to be capable of forcing a controlled possession of herself by a fox spirit, and engage in kuchiyose, a sort of séance to speak on behalf of the spirit.

=== Clinical study and psychiatry ===
Kitunetsuki remained a common diagnosis for mental illness until the early 20th century. Possession was the explanation for the abnormal behavior displayed by the afflicted individuals. In the late 19th century, Shunichi Shimamura noted that physical diseases that caused fever were often considered kitsunetsuki. The superstition has lost favor, but stories of fox possession still occur, such as allegations that members of the Aum Shinrikyo cult had been possessed.

Clinical psychiatric studies of the kitsunetsuki were still made during the Meiji Era (end of 20th century), especially around Shimane (Hearn's home province) where kitsunetsuki remained prevalent. A German doctor coined the term alopecanthropy for it, in 1885.

Symptoms include cravings for rice or sweet adzuki beans, listlessness, restlessness, and aversion to eye contact. This sense of kitsunetsuki is similar to but distinct from clinical lycanthropy.

== Familiar spirits ==
The faith healers who are hired to cure the kitsune-tsuki as an illness, the miko se families are said to have been able to use their fox to gain fortune, but marriage into such a family was considered forbidden as it would enlarge the family. They were also said to be able to bring about illness and curse the possessions, crops, and livestock of enemies. This caused them to be considered taboo by the other families, which led to societal problems.

There are families that tell of protective fox spirits, and in certain regions, possession by a kuda-gitsune, osaki, yako, and hito-gitsune are also called kitsunetsuki.

== See also ==
- gedō – another tutelary (familial) animal spirit
- tōbyō – another tutelary (familial) animal spirit, usually conceived of as snake
