= Marrowbone Creek =

Marrowbone Creek may refer to:

- Marrowbone Creek (Missouri)
- Marrowbone Creek (Tennessee)
- Marrowbone Creek (West Virginia)
