= Marrowbone Creek (Missouri) =

Stream in the American state of Missouri

Coordinates: 39.8675077°N 93.9410541°W

Marrowbone Creek is a stream in Daviess County in the U.S. state of Missouri. It is a tributary of Honey Creek.

According to tradition, Marrowbone Creek was named from an incident when some frontiersmen cooked and ate copious amounts of elk bone marrow near the creek.

== See also ==
- List of rivers of Missouri
