= Sky Fox (mythology) =

Divine beast in Japanese folklore

Sky Fox Celestial Fox
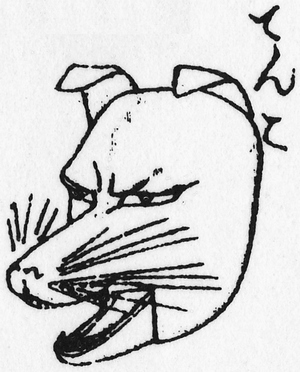
- Tenko, in the Hokusai Manga by Hokusai Katsushika

Chinese name
- Chinese: 天狐
Transcriptions
Standard Mandarin
- Hanyu Pinyin: tiān hú

Korean name
- Hangul: 천호
- Hanja: 天狐
Transcriptions
- Revised Romanization: cheonho

Japanese name
- Kanji: 天狐
- Hiragana: てんこ
Transcriptions
- Revised Hepburn: tenko

The Sky Fox (Chinese: 天狐; pinyin: tiān hú), or Celestial Fox is a type of divine beast in East Asian mythology. After reaching 1,000 years of age and gaining its ninth tail, a fox spirit turns a golden color, becoming a sky fox, the most powerful form of the fox spirit, and then ascends to the heavens. With its new celestial form, it is able to see a thousand li ahead (c. 3,927 km (2,440 mi)).

The stories of the Sky Fox are first recorded in Taiping Guangji, which contains numerous accounts of these Sky Foxes. Notably, the Sky Foxes documented in this source are all male. In later records, however, female celestial foxes also appear. The characteristics of having nine tails and golden fur are assimilated into the depiction of the female fox spirit Daji (妲己), whose appearance is often portrayed with these features. These traits are also prominently reflected in the depiction of the nine-tailed fox in Japanese ukiyo-e art.

== History ==
The mythology of multi-tailed foxes originate from the beliefs of Ancient China. A collection of stories dating from the Jin dynasty known as Xuanzhongji (玄中记; 玄中記; Xuánzhōngjì) records:

"When a fox reaches the age of fifty, it is able to transform into a woman. At a hundred years old, a beauty or a female shaman, who knows about outside affairs a thousand li away. It's kindness and charm make people confused and demented. At a thousand years, the fox connects with the Sky and is transformed into the Sky Fox."

According to legend, It is said that there are three ways to make a fox open its mind and gain wisdom. The first is to swallow treasures by accident, such as the treasures of heaven and earth. The second is for the fox to find a good place to cultivate its spiritual virtues (修行; Xiūxíng). As foxes are Yin, they need a lot of Yin Air (陰氣) containing the essence of the moon in order to work at self improvement. Therefore, movies and TV shows sometimes portrays foxes worshiping the moon. The third way for a fox to gain wisdom is to follow a Taoist monk or master to learn abilities.

Every 100 years, a catastrophe occurs. It was believed that if a fox could go through it smoothly, it will grow a new tail. The number of nine-tailed foxes is small because many foxes unfortunately interrupted their practice of self-cultivation or died during the 3~5 tail period. When the fox reaches 1,000 years of age, it will become the Thousand-Year Heavenly Fox, formally gaining the Heavenly Court's canonization and obtaining the Immortal Rank.

In the Edo period of Japan, Tenko were considered to be of the highest rank of foxes, and in the essays "Zen'an Zuihitsu (善庵随筆)" and "Hokusō Sadan (北窓瑣談)", the foxes are ranked in the order of tenko, kūko, kiko, and then yako. Also, in the Nihon Shoki, in the 9th year of Emperor Jomei (637), the great shooting star was written as 天狗 (normally read "tengu") and was given the reading of "amatsu kitsune", and from this, the essay "Zen'an Zuihitsu" put forth the theory that tenko and tengu are the same creature.

In Taiping Guangji, the Sky Foxes, despite being considered divine beings, often cause trouble in the human world and are ultimately subdued by Taoist priests. However, due to their status as celestial emissaries, they are spared from execution. Instead of being killed, the Sky Foxes are typically beaten or exiled to foreign lands as punishment. One such Sky Fox, Liu Cheng (劉成), was banished to the ancient Korean kingdom of Silla after causing chaos in China. According to legend, the people of Silla came to revere and worship this Sky Fox as a deity. This tale is later cited in a much later Korean poetry collection known as Heeamjip (希庵集).

The Korean kumiho that appears in the Joseon-era novel Jeon Woo-chi also shares characteristics of the Sky Fox. Like the Sky Fox, the kumiho possesses nine tails and golden fur, carries the Sky Fox’s signature item known as the Cheonseo ("sky book"), and attempts to escape to the heavens. In traditional Chinese Sky Fox legends, humans who try to seize the Cheonseo from the Sky Fox often meet fatal or unfortunate ends. However, Jeon Woo-chi subverts this narrative: the protagonist, Jeon Woo-chi, successfully steals the Cheonseo and masters the magical techniques recorded within it.

Furthermore, at the first ridge of the Fushimi Inari-taisha, a male fox by the name of Osugi (小薄) is worshipped as Suehiro Daijin (末廣大神), however, these foxes are always the divine messengers of Inari Ōkami, and not Inari Ōkami himself.

In Ojika, Nagasaki, the tenko is a type of spirit possession, and it is said that those who are possessed by it have a divination ability that is always correct, and is thus a divine spiritual power.

== See also ==
- Fox spirit
- Inari Ōkami
- Kitsune
- Kumiho
