= Kuda-gitsune =

Type of spirit possession in legends around various parts of Japan

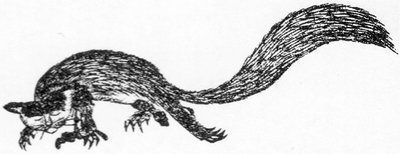
"Kudagitsune" from the Shōzan chomon kishū by Miyoshi Shōzan —2007 facsimile from the Hōsa Library, Nagoya copy of the Kaei 3/1850 edition (Note: Cf. 1903 facsimile and original woodcut from the Waseda University copy of the 1850 edition.)

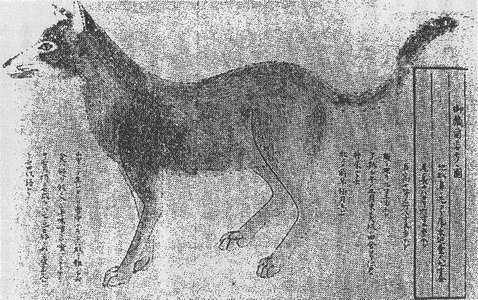
"Kudagitsune" from the Kasshi yawa. From the caption, its length without the tail is calculable to "1 shaku and 2 or 3 sun (approx. 1.2–1.3 feet). (Note: "Body 1 shaku and 2 [or] 3 sun" (Japanese: 体一尺二三寸) according to Yanagita.) (Note: Yanagita gives a measurement not directly in the original text, but one which matches the calculated difference: the original text gives "[Kono] kitsune hana no saki yori o no sue made 1shaku 9 sun-yo, o no nagasa bakari 6 sun 5 ho hodo, mi[no] takasa se no tokoro 8 sun 5 ho hodo, hara no mawari 9 sun 2 ho (兒狐鼻の先より尾の末迄一尺九寸餘尾の長さばかり六寸五歩ほど身高さ背のところ八寸五歩ほど腹の廻り九寸二歩ほど)" thus giving full length at 1.9+ shaku, the tail length at about 0.65 shaku, height at tail 0.85 shaku, and girth around belly 0.92 shaku. Here "1歩 (1 bu)" has been taken to mean "1分 (1 bu)", or 1/100 shaku.)

The kuda-gitsune or kuda-kitsune (管狐, クダ狐), also pronounced kanko, is a type of spirit possession in legends around various parts of Japan. It may be known otherwise as osaki especially in the Kantō region, and also considered equivalent to the izuna.

It was believed to assume the guise of a small mammal and able to fit inside a pipe or bamboo tube, but normally only its keeper or user (kitsune-tsukai) was able to see it. The user, through the power of the kuda, was believed capable of divulging a person's past or foretelling his future; this soothsayer was also capable of performing curses, bringing calamity upon targets. In regions where the superstition was held, a prospering household could be accused of achieving its prosperity because it was a house possessed by the spirit (kuda-tsuki). The fox (and its analogues by other names) was said to multiply in number each time a marriage took place, following the bride to her place of marriage, thus disseminating into more households.

== Nomenclature ==
The kuda-gitsune or kuda-kitsune (管狐, クダ狐), which in Chinese fashion (onyomi) can also be read as kanko (old romanization kwanko), derives its name from being small enough to fit inside a tube, according to one explanation. It may also have earned its name due to its tail resembling a tube spliced in two. Folklorist Yanagita Kunio conjectured that the kuda alluded to a god's descent (verb: kudaru) from the mountain, this god Ta-no-Kami ("rice paddy god") being roughly equated with the Yama-no-Kami or "mountain god".

=== Aliases ===
The izuna (飯綱) is a kindred sort of spirit, employed by the "fox-user" or kitsune-tsukai (狐遣い), (Note: Some commentators interpret -tsukai to mean "user/practitioner (of magic, or a familiar/servant animal)", while others interpret the wort to mean the "art" or the "magic". Inoue's original text reads "世に狐使いと称するものは.." would could easily be translate as "Those in the world who call themselves fox-user", following the "user" interpretation, but de Visser restated it in English as "Those who practice the so-called kitsune-tsukai, choosing the other interpretation. De Visser later mentions the "employment of foxes", supposedly as his rendering of kitsune-tsukai. A more modern scholar also glosses kitsune-tsukai as "fox-using", yet his use of the term in the instance: "The practices by which kitsune-tsukai are reported to gain their vulpine familiars" clearly points to a person. Casal commenting on the kuda does construe the kitsune-tsukai as the person engaging in the fox magic, but adding to the confusion, renders it as "fox-messenger or fox-assistant", because it is possible to interpret tsukai as either the user, or the used (i.e., the errand-boy, servant, etc.)) (although in modern standard Japanese, the word is pronounced īzuna and denotes the least weasel).

The osaki fox is also identified as an equivalent spirit employed by the "fox-user" (kitsune tsukai).

According to one summarization, the term kuda-gitsune (クダ狐) is prevalent in the Central region (Chūbu region (Note: Including Nagano, Aichi, Shizuoka prefectures, cf. §Geography below)), whereas the appellation izuna tends to be used in north-central Nagano and the northeast (Tōhoku), and osaki in the northern Kantō region.

== Geography ==
The kuda-gitsune lore has traditionally been found in Shinano Province (present-day Nagano Prefecture, in the northern Central Region) (Note: Skeptic scholar Inoue Enryō in his Yōkaigaku Kōgi (妖怪學講義), quotes a newspaper article (which he wrote) in the Dai-nihon kyōiku shinbun. Inoue gives the location as Ina in Shinano Province. Also, the Edo Period work Shōzan chomon kishū (cf. infra) gave and entry on the kuda-gitsune of Shinshū (Shinano Province).) and has been associated with the Iizuna gongen, the deity of Mount Iizuna in the area of Togakushi or the Iizuna or Izuna ritual (Izuna no hō (飯綱の法), practiced in shugendō) based on its worship (cf. §Izuna below).

The kuda-gitsune also occurred in the folk-belief of more southerly portions of the Central Region known as the Tōkai subregion, namely Mikawa (in present-day Aichi) and Tōtomi Provinces (present-day Shizuoka Prefecture). It also forms part of the folklore in the southern Kantō region, Tōhoku region, and elsewhere. There are no legends of kuda-gitsune in Kantō besides the Chiba Prefecture and Kanagawa Prefecture, and this is said to be because Kantō is the domain of the osaki fox tradition.

Despite the localizations above, the ability of using the kanko/kudagitsune is purportedly obtained by trained yamabushi (the ascetics of shugendō) at their holiest sites, either Mount Kinpu or Mount Ōmine (in present-day Nara Prefecture), according to Asakawa Zen'an who wrote the essay Zen'an zuihitsu. (Note: Matsura Seizan's Kasshi yawa (multi-volume, completed 1841) mentioned Zen'an in the illustrated entry about kuda-gitsune, whereas the Zen'an zuihitsu (cf. infra) was not printed until Kaei 2 (1850).)

== General description ==
According to some sources the kuda-gitsune ("pipe fox" or "tube fox") is kept inside a bamboo tube, especially by the yamabushi. The fox in the bamboo tube may be summoned by reciting a magical incantation, and be made to answer any questions asked. Alternatively it is said that fox user (kitsune-tsukai) keeps the tamed kuda fox spirit in the bosom of his garment ("pocket") or up his sleeve, and the creature collects assorted information which it whispers to its master's ear, so that the practitioner of the art may then reveal another's history, or predict another's future. The spirit remains invisible, and can be only seen by the user.

As for its size, the Edo Period essay collection Kasshi yawa (1841) by Matsura Seizan has an entry on the kuda-gitsune, including an illustration (above) of the fox said to have been brought from a bucolic area in Osaka and exhibited (Note: The illustrated figure is entitled Okuramae misemono no zu (御蔵前みせものの図) indicating it was a misemono (exhibit) held at Kuramae, or the front of the government rice warehouse in Asakusa.) in Edo in the year Bunsei 5 (1822), (Note: Yanagita redacted as Bunsei 5 nen no 5 gatsu (「文政五年の五月」, 5th month of Bunsei), but the original drawing caption Bunsei 5 nen no shōgatsu (「壬午の正月末」, New (1st) month of jingo). The jingo is the correct 60 year cycle designation for this year, a combination of the "elder water" stem of the 10 Heavenly Stems and the "horse" zodiac of the 12 Earthly Branches.) reporting the full length of the specimen (excluding the tail) at 1.2–1.3 shaku (36–39 cm). Yanagita Kunio was of the opinion however that this size represented the largest of this kind, as smaller ones were about the size of a polecat (itachi, <30 cm?). (Note: Note that the Kashi yawa refers to a different specimen measuring "somewhat larger than a polecat/itachi (鼬よりやゝ大きく)", but this is taken from Asakawa Zen'an, who was shown hides from the specimen allegedly surgically extracted by a doctor (cf. infra).)

Other sources have described the smallness of the kuda-gitsune by comparing it to the size of a house mouse, (Note: Note that Inoue Enryō wrote the entry for osaki-gitsune in an encyclopedia, describing it as "white colored, about the size of a house mouse ("色白く、大きさは二十日鼠ほどなり").) or the size of a matchbox.

The Shōzan chomon kishū (想山著聞奇集) (1850) also provided visual illustration of a specific anecdotal example, (Note: One purportedly killed during the Kyōwa era (1801–4) at Matsushima station, Ina-gun, Shinano Province (today's Nagano Prefecture). The eradicator was a physician named Agata Dōgen (縣道玄) .) which reportedly had a catlike face, otter-like body, gray-colored fur, and was about the size of a squirrel, with a thick tail.

And according to Asakawa Zen'an's essay collection Zen'an zuihitsu (善庵随筆) (pub. 1850), the kanko/kuda-gitsune is about the size of a weasel (itachi) (Note: The original text gives 鼬鼠 and even though Visser parses this into "same size as weasels or rats", in fact 鼬鼠 is an alternate way to write itachi (instead of just 鼬), and Kaneko reads this passage as just itachi (weasel) with no "rat" mentioned.) with vertical eyes, but otherwise the same as a feral rat (or perhaps rather the yako), except its thick fur is not all matted/dissheveled. (Note: The original text regarding the fur reads "毛は扶疎として蒙戎たらざるなり (the hair/fur is lush and luxuriant [as tree branches outspread], but are not messed/dissheveled/disorderly )", even though de Visser gives "hair is thinner".) (Note: Zen'an zuihitsu, selection, in the anthology Hyakka setsurin. The 1892 edition was consulted by de Visser.)

=== Izuna ===
An izuna is a fox servant, employed by certain "sorcerers" called izuna-tsukai (izuna users) in the Shinano Region (Nagano Prefecture); these familiars may also be employed by other psychic type religious or spiritual professionals in Niigata Prefecture and other parts of the Northeast, as well as in the Chūbu region, and those who profess to have special powers claim to perform clairvoyancy with the use of the izuna. The sorcerer was also believed capable of harming his client's enemies using the izuna, causing them to become possessed or to fall ill.

The izuna is considered by some believers to be a servant of the deity called the Izuna gongen or Īzuna gongen, typically represented as a tengu standing on a white fox. Therefore, the sorcerer (izuna-tsukai) sometimes may be a worshipper of this particular gongen deity, however, that is not always the case.

=== Kitsune-tsuki ===
Sometimes it is told to be a type of kitsune-tsuki (possession by a kitsune "fox") and depending on the region, a household that has a kuda-gitsune occupying it are labeled as "kuda-mochi" ("kuda"-haver), "kuda-ya" ("kuda"-proprietor), "kuda-tsukai" ("kuda"-user), etc., and become stigmatized.

Such a family, though they may amass wealth is seen to have achieved it by striking fear among others by its fox-using, and marriage with a fox-user household was shunned by the rest. The kuda-gitsune were allegedly commanded by its master to raid other families' homes and steal their possessions, and in this way the master's family grows wealthy―or at least in the beginning. Since the kuda-gitsune multiplies until their number grows to 75, the large pack of foxes eat away at the family's wealth, bringing about their downfall.

As for the foxes quickly multiplying to 75, it is also said that every time a bride from a kuda or osaki-haunted household goes off to be married, she is said to bring 75 of the kuda minions along with her into the new household. This piece of folklore was perhaps invented as a convenient explanation as to why so many families came to be accused of being fox-owners, as time went by. (Note: A similar tradition about bringing 75 minions is attached to the gedō of Shimane Prefecture and the tōbyō of Hiroshima and Tottori Prefecture, as Yanagita has pointed out.)

The kuda-tsuki is spiritual possession much like the hebi-tsuki (serpent-possession), inugami-tsuki (hound deity), or even tanuki-tsuki (racoon dog) of other communities, and ultimately derive from serpent-god worship, according to geography and history scholar Shōjirō Kobayashi.
