= Polecat Creek (Iowa) =

Stream in Iowa, U.S.

Coordinates: 42°01′30″N 93°54′24″W

Polecat Creek is a stream in the U.S. state of Iowa. It is a tributary to Honey Creek.

Polecat Creek was named for the polecats which roamed along its course.
