= Honey Creek (Perry County, Ohio) =

Stream in Ohio, U.S.

Coordinates: 39°55′26″N 82°26′0″W

Honey Creek is a stream in the U.S. state of Ohio.

Honey Creek was for the frequent honeybees there.

== See also ==
- List of rivers of Ohio
