= Hito-gitsune =

Japanese mythical spirit possession

Hito-gitsune or ninko (人狐) is a type of spirit possession told about in legends of the Chūgoku region of western Japan.

== Concept ==
They are said to be the spirit of a Japanese marten-like animal, and it is said that those possessed by one would be afflicted with stomach aches and mental abnormalities. In some areas, it is said that a mizu-itachi (水鼬, water weasel) within ponds are hito-gitsune. Though it has itachi (weasel) in its name, they are said to be much smaller than real weasels and stay in a large willow of the pond, and several of them would all make a bustle at once.

In Shimane Prefecture, hito-gitsune are considered to be smaller than a normal fox. Hito-gitsune would enter people's bodies and make them ill, and when that person dies, they would bite a hole in that person's belly or back to emerge. It is said that the corpse would have a black hole in it somewhere.

Families possessed by a hito-gitsune are called hito-gitsune-mochi (人狐持ち, lit. "those that have hito-gitsune"), and it is said that those that are hated by this family would get possessed by one of their hito-gitsune. It is said that those possessed by a hito-gitsune would become the hito-gitsune itself, and through the hito-gitsune, they would talk about various things with families that have hito-gitsune, walk on all fours like a fox, and like to eat food that foxes like to eat.

When someone from a family that has hito-gitsune marries, 75 hito-gitsune would attack the other family, so families that had hito-gitsune tended to be treated coldly and marriages with them tended to be avoided. Also, families that have hito-gitsune would grow wealthy as a result of the hito-gitsune carrying back riches, but if someone of the family mistreats the hito-gitsune, the fortunes of the family, no matter how rich they were, would immediately decline. Furthermore, it is said that anyone who buys the assets of a family that falls to ruin like this would also be attacked by hito-gitsune. No matter how prestigious the family, if they ever even get rumored to have hito-gitsune, other people would distance themselves from them, leading them to hardship.

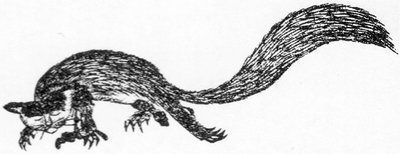
Kuda-gitsune from the Shōzan Chomon Kishū by Miyoshi Shōzan

In Tottori Prefecture, families possessed by a fox are called kitsune-zoru, and the foxes that possess such families are called hito-gitsune. It is said that around such a family, 75 kin of the fox would be playing around, and that its true identity was a male weasel. Also, in Miyagi Prefecture, kuda-gitsune are also called hito-gitsune.
