= Polecat Creek (Grand River tributary) =

Stream in Cass County, Missouri, U.S.

Coordinates: 38.6725108°N 94.3916163°W

Polecat Creek is a stream in Cass County in the U.S. state of Missouri.

Polecat Creek was named for the fact the area was a favorite hunting ground of polecats.

== See also ==
- List of rivers of Missouri
