= Honey Creek (Blackwater River tributary) =

Stream in the American state of Missouri

Honey Creek is a stream in Johnson and Lafayette counties in the U.S. state of Missouri. It is a tributary of the Blackwater River.

The stream headwaters are at 38°55′51″N 93°54′46″W and the confluence with the Blackwater is at 38°48′35″N 93°48′26″W.

Honey Creek was named for the honeybees near its course.

== See also ==
- List of rivers of Missouri
