= Honey Creek (Fox River tributary) =

Stream in the American state of Missouri

Honey Creek is a stream in Clark County in the U.S. state of Missouri. It is a tributary of the Fox River.

The stream headwaters are at 40°26′59″N 91°51′06″W and the confluence with the Fox River is at 40°20′15″N 91°29′21″W.

Honey Creek was named for the honeybees along its course.

== See also ==
- List of rivers of Missouri
