= Honey Creek (White River tributary) =

Stream in Johnson County, Indiana, U.S.

Coordinates: 39°36′39″N 86°13′56″W

Honey Creek is a stream in Johnson County, Indiana, in the United States. It is a tributary of the White River.

Honey Creek was so named from the fact pioneers found a nest of honeybees there.

== See also ==
- List of rivers of Indiana
