= Honey Creek, Pottawattamie County, Iowa =

Honey Creek, Iowa
- Unincorporated community
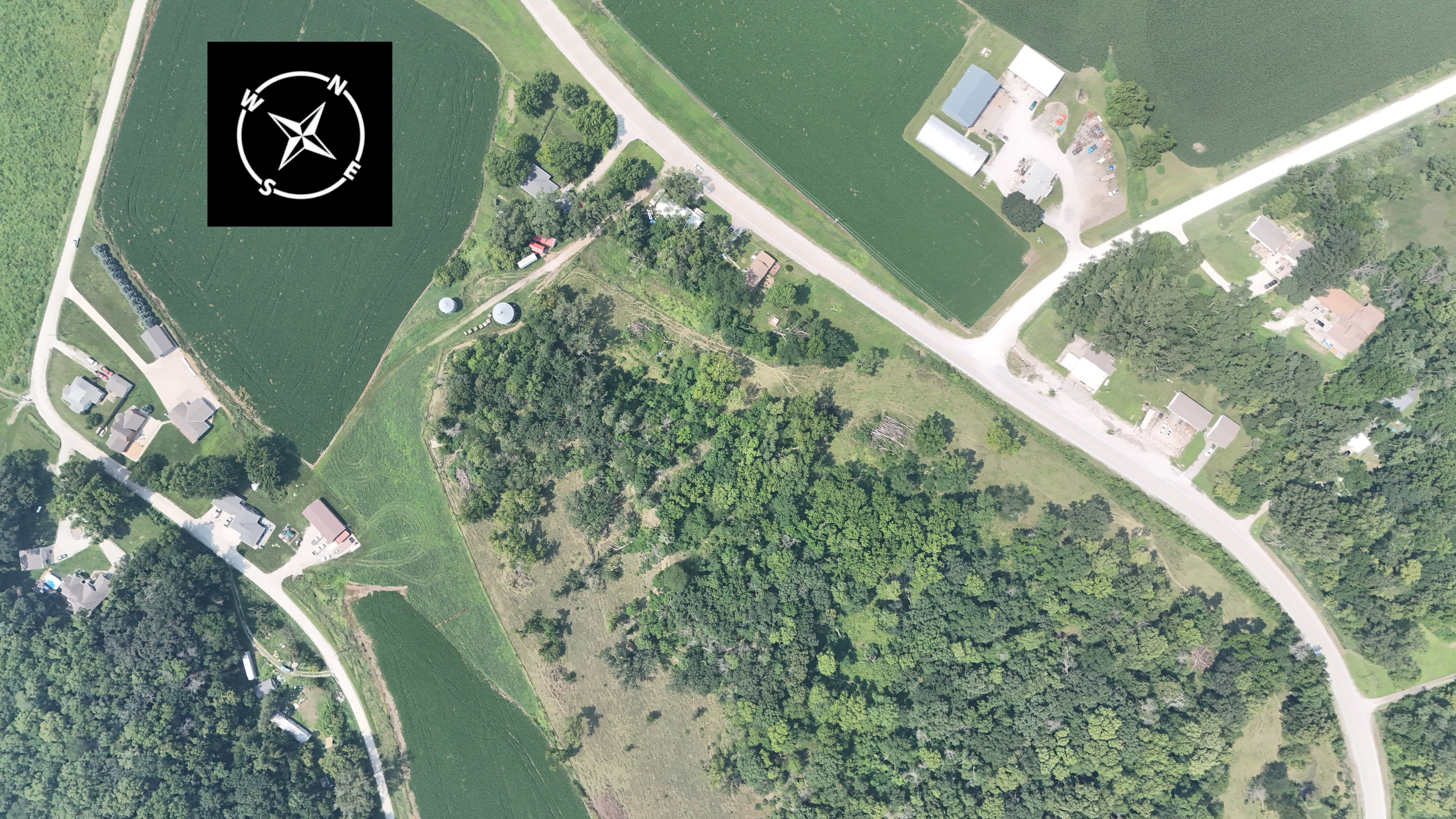
- An aerial view of Honey Creek on July 13, 2025

- Location within the state of Iowa Honey Creek, Iowa (the United States)
- Coordinates: 41°25′50″N 95°51′59″W
- Country: United States
- State: Iowa
- County: Pottawattamie
- Elevation: 1,014 ft (309 m)
- Time zone: UTC-6 (Central (CST))
  - Summer (DST): UTC-5 (CDT)
- ZIP codes: 51542
- GNIS feature ID: 464584

Honey Creek is an unincorporated community in Pottawattamie County, Iowa, United States. Its elevation is 1,014 feet (309 m). Although it is unincorporated, it has a ZIP code 51542.

== History ==
Honey Creek was founded in the 1860s when the Chicago and North Western Railway was extended to that point. The community took its name from nearby Honey Creek. A post office was established in Honey Creek in 1868, and remained in operation until it was discontinued in 1990. Honey Creek's population was 21 in 1902, and 100 in 1925. The population was estimated at 100 in 1940.
