= Honey Creek (Iowa River tributary) =

Stream in Iowa and Poweshiek County, Iowa, U.S.

Coordinates: 41.836945°N 92.192961°W

Honey Creek is a stream in Iowa and Poweshiek counties, Iowa, in the United States. It is a tributary of Iowa River.

Honey Creek was so named when a pioneer cut down a tree and a honey bee hive fell into the creek.

== See also ==
- List of rivers of Iowa
