= Honey Creek (Platte River tributary) =

Stream in Iowa and Missouri

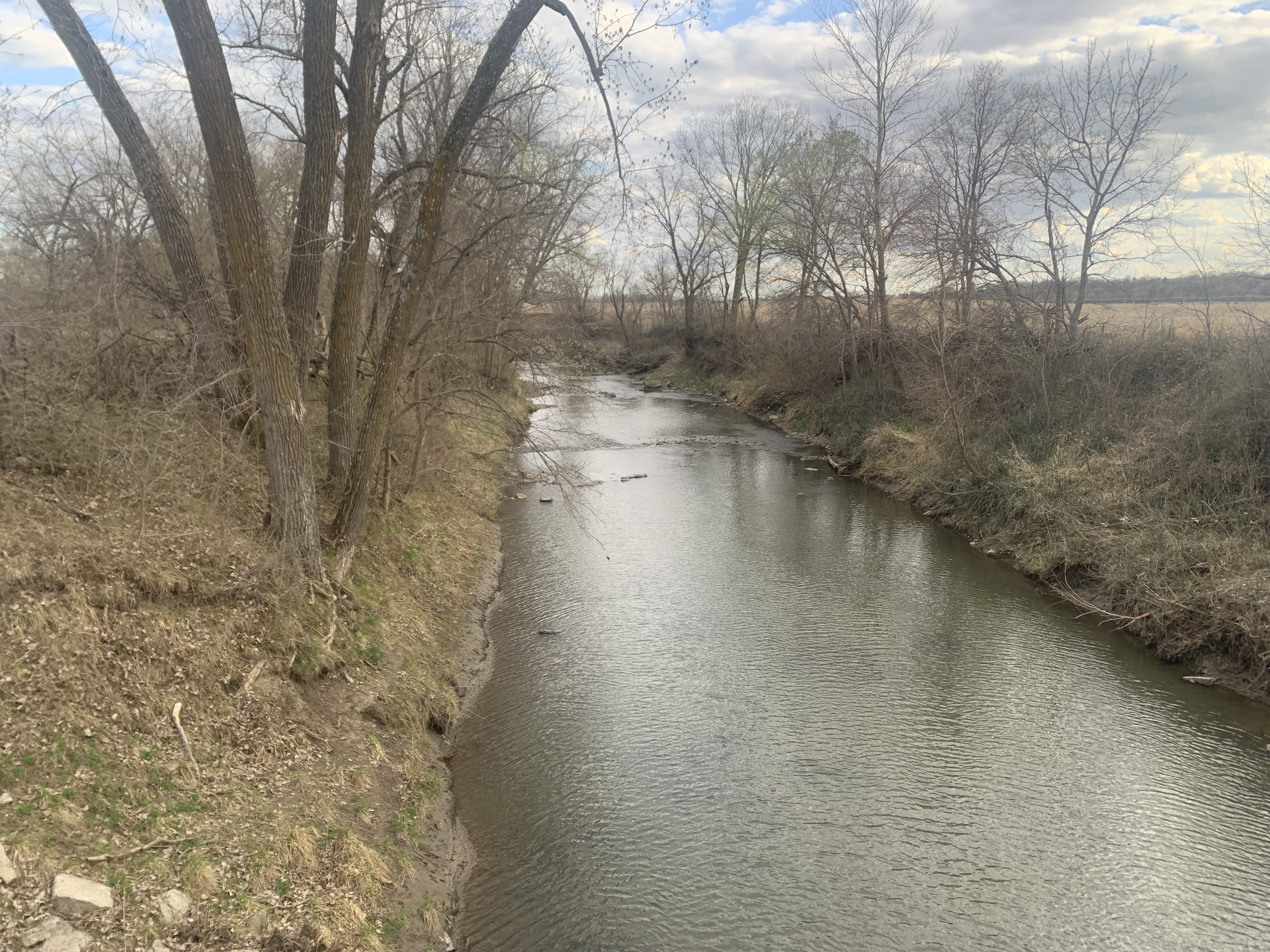
- Honey Creek on 250th street bridge west of Ravenwood

Location
- Country: United States
- State: Iowa and Missouri
- County: Taylor County, Iowa and Nodaway County, Missouri

Physical characteristics
- Source
  - location: Grant Township
  - coordinates: 40°48′31″N 94°29′22″W
  - elevation: 1,250 ft (380 m)
- Mouth: Platte River
  - location: Jackson Township
  - coordinates: 40°21′19″N 94°41′16″W
  - elevation: 981 ft (299 m)
- Length: 49.7 mi (80.0 km)

Basin features
- Progression: Honey Creek → Platte River → Missouri River → Mississippi River → Atlantic Ocean

Honey Creek is a stream in Taylor County, Iowa and Nodaway County, Missouri in the United States. It is a tributary of the Platte River and is 49.7 miles (80.0 km) long.

There are three named direct tributaries: Morgan Branch, Hog Branch, Wolf Pen Branch, and Fox Branch.

Honey Creek was so named on account of honeybees near its course.

== See also ==
- Tributaries of the Platte River
- List of rivers of Iowa
- List of rivers of Missouri
