= Honey Creek (Grand River tributary) =

Stream in the American state of Missouri

Honey Creek is a stream in Daviess County in the U.S. state of Missouri. It is a tributary of the Grand River.

The stream headwaters are at 39°54′30″N 94°02′44″W and the confluence is at 39°52′46″N 93°54′32″W.

Honey Creek most likely was named for the honeybees near its course.

== See also ==
- List of rivers of Missouri
