= Honey Creek (Des Moines River tributary) =

Stream in Iowa, U.S.

Coordinates: 42°00′40″N 93°55′20″W

Honey Creek is a stream in the U.S. state of Iowa. It is a tributary to the Des Moines River.

Honey Creek was named for the honeybees along its course.
