= Honey Creek (Missouri River tributary) =

Stream in Pottawattamie and Harrison County, Iowa, U.S.

Honey Creek is a stream in Pottawattamie and Harrison counties, Iowa, in the United States. It is a tributary of Missouri River.

The stream headwaters are at 41°33′48″N 95°46′51″W and the confluence with the Missouri is at 41°25′25″N 95°55′52″W.

Honey Creek was named by settlers for the great number of honeybees seen at the creek.

== See also ==
- List of rivers of Iowa
