= Yako (fox) =

Type of fox spirit in Japanese mythology/folklore

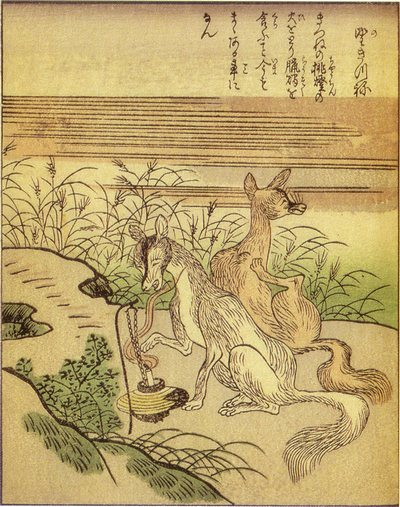
"Nogitsune (野狐)" from the Ehon Hyaku Monogatari by Shunsen Takehara. It is the "yako" of this article, as well as the yaken.

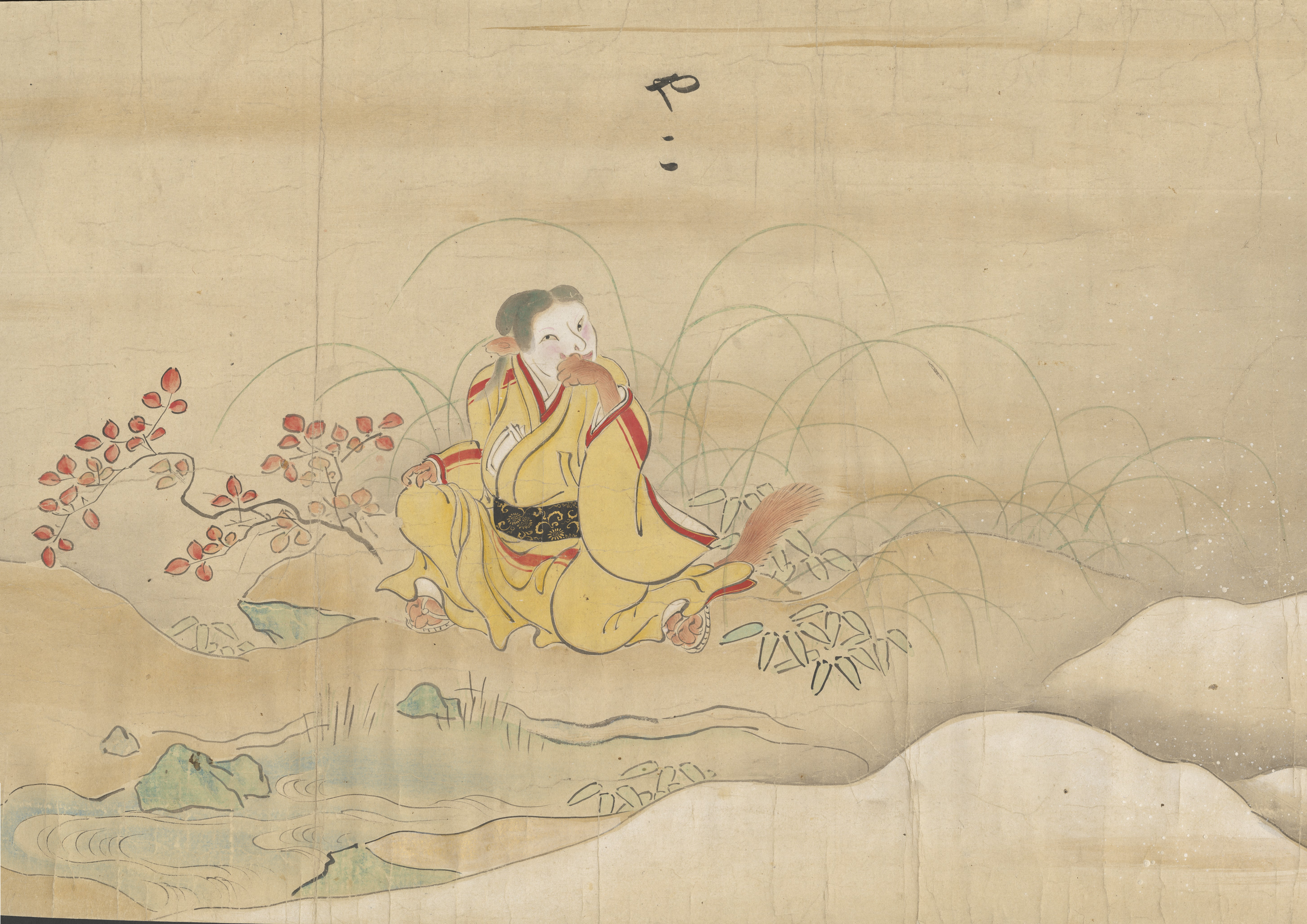
"Yako やこ" from Bakemono no e scroll, Brigham Young University

Yako or nogitsune (野狐) is a type of kitsune (fox spirit), as told in Kyūshū. To be possessed by it is called "yako-tsuki" (野狐憑き). The word 野狐, lit. 'field fox' or 'wild fox', is also used for foxes in the wild in general.

The appearance of a yako is almost completely consistent among all legends; they are black or white, are slightly larger than a mouse, and smaller than a cat. The original yako is said to be invisible to the eye. In Hirado, Nagasaki Prefecture, they normally bring along a great crowd that walks with them, and thus there is the phrase "yako's thousand-fox company (ヤコの千匹連れ, yako no senbiki tsure)."

In Nagasaki Prefecture, Saga Prefecture, and other places in Northern Kyūshū, those who are possessed by a yako show symptoms like an illness. On Iki Island, they are also called yako, and since they resemble weasels, it is said that when one of them conceals themselves under a person's armpits, that person would become possessed by a yako. It is said that getting a burn or smallpox scar licked by a yako results in death, and those who have been afflicted with smallpox would go inside a net in order not to get close to a yako, and protected themselves from a yako getting in by either scattering ashes from an epaulette tree or leaving a sword.

In Southern Kyūshū, family lines would get possessed by a yako, and family lines that raised yako (possessed by a yako) would have their progeny possessed, and if they were no longer able to support it, it would possess its cattle and horses. It is said that the people of families that have a yako could incite the yako to possess those they have bad relations with, and in Kiire, Ibusuki District, Kagoshima Prefecture (now Kagoshima), it is said that becoming possessed by it results in becoming a semi-invalid.
