= Osaki =

Type of fox spirit in Japanese mythology/folklore

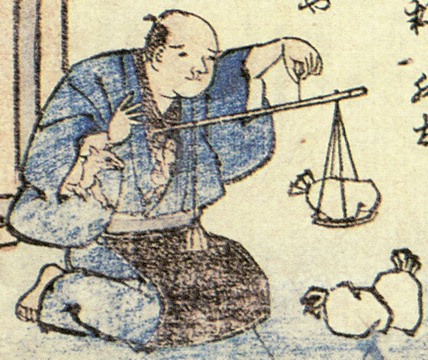
"Osaki-gitsune" (尾崎狐) from the Kyōka Hyaku Monogatari by Masasumi Ryūkansaijin. The faces of osaki peek out from the bosom and the left sleeve of the man holding the balance.

Osaki is a type of yokai told about in legends of Japan. They are also called osaki-gitsune. They can also alternatively be written 尾先. Other ways of writing them include 尾裂, 御先狐, 尾崎狐, among others.

== Concept ==
They are in the folk beliefs of certain mountain villages of the Kantō region as well as other areas such as the Saitama Prefecture, the Okutama region of Tokyo Metropolis, the Gunma Prefecture, the Tochigi Prefecture, the Ibaraki Prefecture, the Nagano Prefecture, among other regions. There are no legends of this in Tokyo other than in Tama, and this said to be because osaki are unable to cross the Toda river (a part of Warabi-shuku) or because in Kantō Hasshū (eight Edo provinces of Kantō), there was the head of the foxes, the Ōji Inari Jinja, preventing the osaki from entering Edo.

There is also a legend of an osaki that was originally a nine-tailed fox, Tamamo-no-mae, who perished at Nasu field (a field near Nasu), its golden fur flying off in the process, and became a spirit, after which the nine-tailed fox transformed into a sessho-seki (killing stone), and when the monk Gennō Shinshō came to calm this curse by splitting this stone, one of its fragments flew to Kōzuke Province (now Gunma Prefecture) and became an osaki. Its name is said to come from how it was born from one of the nine-tailed fox's tails, so it was called "osaki" (尾先, "tail-front"), and according to the Toen Shōsetsu (兎園小説) by Kyokutei Bakin and others, the tail split into two, which is why it is "osaki" (尾裂, "tail-split"), and there is also the theory that its name comes from misaki, meaning kin of gods.

Depending on the land and on the literature telling about them, the osaki's appearance can be completely different. In the Kyokutei Zakki by Kyokutei Bakin, it was a beast smaller than a fox and resembled a polecat, and around Nanmoku, Kanra District, Gunma Prefecture, it was something like a mixture between polecat and mouse or between ural owl and mouse and said to be a bit larger than a house mouse, and its color has been variously described to be spotted with mixtures of orange, brown, grey, and so on, and it is also sometimes said to have a solid black line from its head to its tail and with a split tail, and in Shimonita of the same district, there are various theories talked about such as how they have human-like ears and a nose that is white just at its tip, how they have a square mouth, and so on. They are said to be quick at movement so they can appear suddenly, and always move in a pack.

== Having Osaki ==
Families that have osaki are called "osaki-mochi" (osaki havers), "osaki-ya" (osaki proprietors), "osaki-tsukai" (osaki users), and so on. They never show themselves and are said to bring gold and silver, rice, and other things on a whim. Osaki-mochi are said to avoid contact with society and marriage with others and only marry among each other. This is said to be because if someone from an osaki family marries another, the other family also becomes osaki-mochi, and this has often been one cause of societal tensions concerning marriages. According to the Edo Period Baiō Zuihitsu (梅翁随筆), if an osaki has possessed a family line, there is no way to rid it from the family no matter what means one attempts to use.

There are some cases when they would not possess a family but instead an individual, and the one possessed would, like in the case of the kitsunetsuki, catch a fever, experience agitation and mental abnormalities, be voracious eaters, and generally have eccentricities. Also, in Ueno, Tano District, Gunma Prefecture, stoats are called "yama-osaki" ("mountain osaki") and they often follow people behind them, but it is said that mistreating them would result in a curse. In another town in the Gunma Prefecture, "osaki," "yama-osaki," and "sato-osaki" ("town osaki") are considered different things, and it is said that the yama-osaki does not possess people but the sato-osaki does.
