= Madaesan =

Mountain in South Korea

Highest point
- Elevation: 1,052.2 m (3,452 ft)

Geography
- Location: South Korea

Korean name
- Hangul: 마대산
- Hanja: 馬垈山
- RR: Madaesan
- MR: Madaesan

Madaesan is a South Korean mountain that extends across Yeongwol County, Gangwon Province and Danyang County, North Chungcheong Province. It has an elevation of 1,052.2 m (3,452 ft).

== See also ==
- List of mountains in Korea
