= Dosol Peak =

Mountain in South Korea

Highest point
- Elevation: 1,314 m (4,311 ft)

Geography
- Location: Gyeongbuk and Chungbuk, South Korea

Korean name
- Hangul: 도솔봉
- Hanja: 兜率峰
- RR: Dosolbong
- MR: Tosolbong

Dosol Peak (Korean: 도솔봉, Dosol-bong) is a mountain of Gyeongbuk and Chungbuk, South Korea. It has an elevation of 1,314 metres. It belongs to the Mount Sobaek National Park.

== See also ==
- List of mountains of Korea
- List of mountains in South Korea
