= Taehwasan (Gangwon and North Chungcheong) =

Mountain in South Korea

Coordinates: 37°07′01″N 128°29′05″E

Highest point
- Elevation: 1,027.4 m (3,371 ft)

Geography
- Location: South Korea

Korean name
- Hangul: 태화산
- Hanja: 太華山
- RR: Taehwasan
- MR: T'aehwasan

Taehwasan (Korean: 태화산) is a South Korean mountain that sits between Yeongwol County, Gangwon Province and Danyang County, North Chungcheong Province. Its summit has an elevation of 1,027.4 m (3,371 ft).

== See also ==
- List of mountains in Korea
