= Danyang Pi clan =

Korean clan from North Chungcheong Province

- Country: North and South Korea
- Current region: Danyang County
- Founder: Pi Wi-jong

The Danyang Pi clan (Korean: 단양 피씨; Hanja: 丹陽 皮氏) is one of the Korean clans. Their bon-gwan was in Danyang County, North Chungcheong Province. According to the 2000 census, the number of members was 1399. Their founder was Pi Wi-jong who was a Jinwu Guard Commander (Hanja: 金吾後衛指揮) in the Yuan Empire. He was dispatched to Goryeo as an envoy during Chungnyeol of Goryeo’s reign. After that, he was naturalized and began the Danyang Pi clan after Pi In-go (皮寅古), his older brother, was chosen as Prince of Danyang (丹山君).

== See also ==
- Korean clan names of foreign origin
