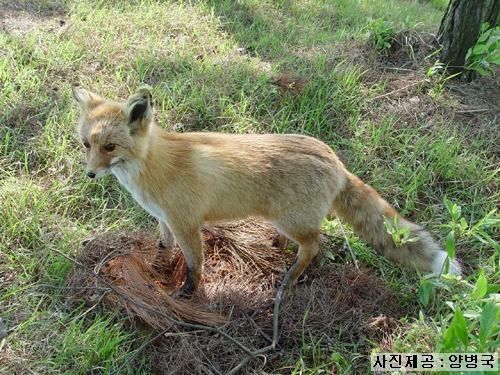
- Korean fox

Scientific classification
- Kingdom: Animalia
- Phylum: Chordata
- Class: Mammalia
- Order: Carnivora
- Family: Canidae
- Subfamily: Caninae
- Genus: Vulpes
- Species: V. vulpes
- Subspecies: V. v. peculiosa

Trinomial name
- Vulpes vulpes peculiosa Kishida, 1924

Synonyms
- Vulpes kiyomassai Kishida & Mori, 1929

= Korean fox =

Subspecies of carnivore

The Korean fox (Vulpes vulpes peculiosa), also known as the Korean red fox, is a subspecies of red fox that lives on the Korean Peninsula, Russia, and Northeast China. It has a body length of 66–68 cm (26–27 in), a tail length of 42–44 cm (17–17 in) and a weight of 4.1–5.9 kg (9.0–13.0 lb).

== Range ==
Prior to the 1960s, the Korean fox was found abundantly throughout Korea. It was found in a wide variety of habitats in the north-eastern, north-western, central and southern Korean peninsula. After the early 1960s, it was determined that populations of the fox were all but eliminated in South Korea. Its populations are also declining in the north and north-eastern areas, found now only in isolated mountain regions. It is most common in lowland forested areas, preferring edge habitats with brushy cover near a stream or river. They have also been found in Korean cemeteries, as they are located near forest edges.

== Ecologic status ==
The Korean fox is considered endangered in its native range. Its decline in abundance has been caused by several factors. There is a high demand for fox fur in the clothing industry, as it is used to make mufflers. This has resulted in extensive illegal hunting of the animal. A nationwide rodenticide program led to secondary poisoning of the predator. On top of this, habitat loss and fragmentation has negatively affected the fox population.

A study was done in 2012 to determine the genetic identity of the subspecies V. v. peculiosa to optimize re-introduction efforts since use of original South Korean individuals is practically impossible as no pure breed remains. It was found that the Korean red fox is most closely related to Eurasian and North pacific red foxes. Re-introduction would have the best chance to improve abundance if individuals from North Korea, China, or Russia were used.

In 1976 a male red fox was captured in the Korean Demilitarized Zone (DMZ) and in 1987 another individual was found in the Jirisian national park. In 2004 the carcass of a red fox was found in Gangwon-do. This finding indicates that these is a possibility that the Korean red fox still lives in the wild forests of Gangwon-do. Reintroduction program with captive animals from the Seoul Zoo has been run at Sobaeksan National Park to reestablish the local population of 50 by 2020.

An experimental reintroduction was conducted within the Korean Demilitarized Zone. In this reintroduction habitat management and constant reintroduction of the red fox was necessary to able to get an increase in the population.

== See also ==
- List of mammals of Korea
- Red fox
- Kumiho
