= Gumiho =

Korean mythological creature

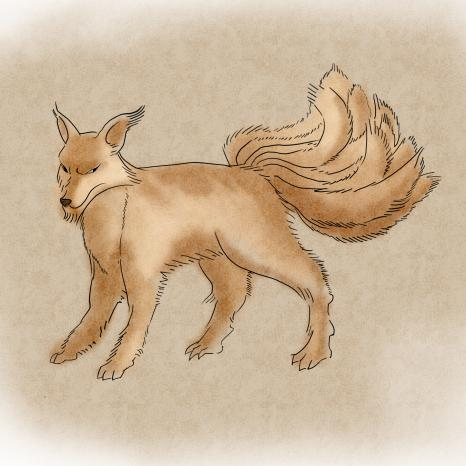
- Kumiho illustration provided by the National Institute of Korean Language

Korean name
- Hangul: 구미호
- Hanja: 九尾狐
- RR: gumiho
- MR: kumiho

A gumiho or kumiho (Korean: 구미호; Hanja: 九尾狐; lit. 'nine-tailed fox') is a creature that appears in the folktales of East Asia and legends of Korea. It is similar to the Chinese jiuweihu, the Japanese kitsune and the Vietnamese hồ ly tinh.

Gumiho is a term that originally referred to a magical fox appearing in Korean novels of the Joseon dynasty, or was used pejoratively in historical records of the same period to denounce treacherous officials. In modern Korea, the designation gumiho has been broadened to encompass all fox spirits described in traditional Korean sources.

== Etymology and terminology ==
In Korean colloquial usage, gumiho is often applied to describe a person (especially a woman) regarded as sly or cunning.

In South Korea, the term gumiho is commonly used to refer to the mythical nine-tailed fox, with ho (狐) being the Sino-Korean reading of the Chinese character for "fox." In contrast, North Korea refers to the creature as kumiyŏu (구미여우), using yŏu, the native Korean word for "fox." While ho is typically reserved for mythological or literary contexts in South Korea, South Koreans also use yeou (여우)—just like North Koreans do—in everyday language to refer to real, biological foxes. However, even the word yeou, which usually denotes a wild fox, carries a subtle nuance of cunning or eeriness, and this term often appears in names referring to Korean fox spirits.

Due to the widespread use of the term gumiho, modern Koreans often refer to all fox spirits by this name; however, this represents a typical case of conflation. In fact, Korean folklore features a variety of fox spirits, including bulyeou (불여우, "fire fox"), baegyeou (백여우, "white fox"), maegu (매구, "fox demon"), and hogwi (호귀, "fox ghost"), all of which, like gumiho, have also been employed in a derogatory sense when referring to women. As these various names indicate, the types of foxes appearing in Korean mythology are diverse and are not limited to the nine-tailed fox (gumiho).

== Characteristics and symbolism ==
In Korean myth, foxes are primarily depicted as deceptive, malevolent, and tragic beings, though there are rare cases where they are portrayed as benevolent toward humans or as deities governing mountains.

They are often portrayed in the form of heretical Buddhist monks or beautiful women and are sometimes depicted as monsters that torment and threaten dragons, which are considered sacred in Korean mythology. In Korean mythology, which is deeply influenced by Buddhism, the dragon is depicted as a divine being that protects the kingdom, whereas its adversary, the fox, is portrayed as a force that disturbs the kingdom or as a harbinger of the kingdom's downfall. In certain tale, the fox spirit is even described as defeating multiple dragons, emphasizing its anti-divine characteristics. At the same time, such accounts suggest that although the fox was not venerated as a sacred creature like the dragon, it was nevertheless regarded in Korea as possessing transcendent powers comparable to those of dragons.

In Korean toponymy, yeougogae (여우고개; lit. 'fox pass') is among the most common place names for mountain passes. Passes bearing the name "fox" are often associated with local folktales or legends about fox spirits.

== Historical development ==
In Korean tradition, the fox spirit appears in early state myths in forms that reflect syncretism with Buddhism and indigenous shamanistic beliefs. During the Goryeo period, however, the status of the fox spirit had already begun to decline. Although certain myths recorded at that time portray the fox in a sacred light, these accounts are generally considered quotations or preservations of earlier Silla beliefs rather than reflections of Goryeo religious culture itself. Most narratives about fox spirits written during the Goryeo period depict them as ominous or inauspicious beings. Unlike in Japan, where fox spirits were integrated positively into Buddhism, the fox in Goryeo Korea does not appear to have undergone such a synthesis.

By the Joseon period, under the influence of Confucian thought, the religious status of the fox spirit declined even further. Confucian ideology discouraged attributing significance to fictional or supernatural beings, and its hierarchical worldview often placed animals below humans in moral and ontological value. As a result, in popular perception and oral tradition, the fox spirit came to be portrayed increasingly as a deceptive, malevolent, or tragic being. However, in literary contexts, depictions of fox spirits became more varied with the introduction of Chinese fantasy fiction, and Joseon-era writers portrayed fox spirits through a range of symbolic meanings rather than a single moral type.

Unlike in China and Japan, where fox spirits were at times associated with religious functions or divine status, evidence for a comparable role in Korea is limited, with notable examples appearing only in the mythology of the ancient kingdom of Silla. In Japan, fox spirits were integrated into the state-sanctioned religious framework, and in China, extensive mythological traditions allowed for the widespread dissemination of fox spirit stories. But by contrast, due to the aforementioned religious and social currents in Korea that were unfavorable toward fox spirits, the development of Korean fox spirit narratives inevitably faced considerable constraints. Consequently, premodern Korean fox spirit traditions remained limited in both quantity and quality compared to those found in Japan or China.

However, this assessment is relative; when considered in absolute terms, Korea possesses a substantial corpus of fox spirit legends, and foxes hold a notable place as supernatural beings within the country's folklore tradition. Since most surviving Korean fox spirit traditions depict the fox as a demonic being, the general perception of the Korean fox spirit is that it is an evil or devilish entity. Many early foreign studies consequently misunderstood the Korean fox spirit as possessing exclusively demonic traits, and even perceptions within Korea have not substantially diverged from this view. Yet, one of the most favorable popular tales about the Gumiho was created in its modern form in the 1800s called "The Gumiho's 100 day wait." Thus, upon closer examination of traditional myths, a minority of Korean folktales present the fox in a neutral or sacred light, in which it aids or rewards humans.

== Modern interpretations and media ==
South Korea, as a country with an active media industry, frequently produces works based on indigenous legends, regardless of the fact that Christianity is the predominant religion in contemporary Korean society. The fox spirit is among the motifs employed in such media. The character Kumiho, featured in the horror anthology series Jeonseorui gohyang ("Hometown of Legends") aired by the public broadcaster KBS, became widely recognized by Korean audiences and has served as a source of inspiration for cultural creators. Furthermore, the traditions of the kumiho and fox spirits also serve as material for contemporary illustrated storybooks. In addition, the story of the Kumiho is further evolving as new interpretations are created. This is due to Korean mythology not being centralized thus allowing more creative freedom from the individual when creating a story based on myth.

The motif of the Kumiho desiring to become human, while not entirely absent in premodern periods, was relatively rare, though it appeared during the Joseon dynasty in tales such as The Fox Sister, The Tale of Palbaek, The Fox Den (although this features a 6 tailed fox named Banya,) The Fox Wife which is the primary folktale (although this specific "tale" originated as an oral tradition, a concrete documented tale that is similar is called 서낭고개의 여우각시.) These tales are especially associated with the "becoming human" motif. In modern Korean mythology, this theme is more prominent, with repeated reinterpretations of fox-spirit narratives reinforcing the image of the Kumiho striving for humanity. Scholars suggest that the emergence of this motif may be attributed to multiple factors, including cultural reactions against the Joseon-era disdain for fox tales, feminist aspirations to liberate Korean women, who had long been marginalized and disparaged through the derogatory connotations associated with the term kumiho, and broader influences from Chinese, Japanese, and Korean folklore—such as The Man and the White Snake, Yuki-Onna, and native "fox becoming human" folktales alongside Ungnyeo—which collectively contributed to the development of the modern interpretation.

As the kumiho has frequently appeared in South Korean media, it has come to be represented in diverse ways, including more sympathetic portrayals. These positive reinterpretations extend not only to the kumiho itself but also to the fox as an animal, sparking renewed public interest in indigenous fox-spirit folklore. This growing interest has led to the rediscovery of older fox-spirit tales, which, when incorporated into newly created kumiho media, sustain a cyclical process of modern reinterpretation and the revival of ancient folklore.

In September 2022, a South Korean distilled soju(Distilled Liquor) brand named Saero was released, featuring the kumiho as its brand symbol. The use of the kumiho as the emblem of a commonly consumed distilled soju suggests that Kumiho has become significantly more familiar and approachable to the general South Korean public.

In contrast, the portrayal of the fox in North Korean media remains largely uniform and negative. During the Cold War, both North and South Korea frequently employed animal metaphors in their mutual propaganda, with each side comparing the other to foxes or jackals. North Korea, however, has continued to reproduce such imagery well into the 21st century. In North Korean dramas, films, and other media, the fox typically symbolizes capitalism, imperialism, selfishness, or divisive behavior. Beyond these limited functions, foxes rarely appear, as state propaganda has already attached a negative connotation to the animal. Assigning alternative meanings would potentially undermine propaganda objectives; therefore, the image of the fox in North Korea remains consistently negative.

Furthermore, When North Korea undertook state-sponsored projects to compile Korean folktales, a rigid class-based and socialist framework was applied, leading to the exclusion of fantastical or frightening stories. This selective approach limited the transmission of traditional fox spirit narratives. Unlike in South Korea, where the kumiho continues to evolve through modern reinterpretations, in North Korea the figure neither develops multifaceted qualities nor benefits from the rediscovery of older traditions, which also restricts the possibility of modern adaptations. As a result, kumiho is depicted almost exclusively as a demonic entity. In the 2021 animated film The Devil's Conqueror (Eoksoe Defeats Devil, 악마를 이긴 억쇠), for example, the devil character is identified with the kumiho.

== Korean fox spirit tales by period ==
=== Fox spirits in ancient Korean mythology ===
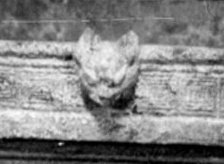
Fox-Head-Shaped Artifact at the National Museum of Korea

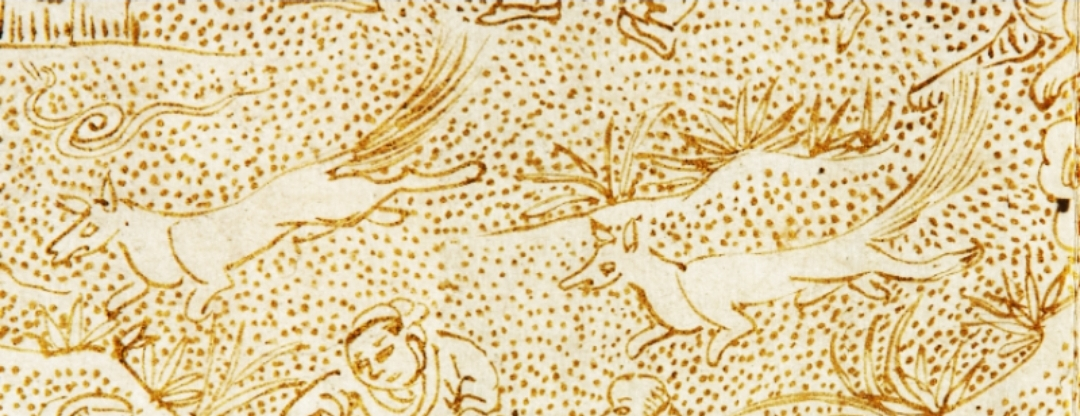
These foxes are depicted in an classical painting from the Lotus Sutra(法華經), a Buddhist scripture from the Goryeo and Joseon periods. The foxes are fleeing from a club. There is a Buddhist doctrine that those who act foolishly are reincarnated as foxes.

The sources of the fox spirit's story that appeared in ancient Korean history are Samgugyusa(三國遺事, Memorabilia of the Three Kingdoms) and Samguksagi(三國史記, History of the Three Kingdoms).

Fox spirits depicted as active in ancient Korean kingdoms are usually described as having white fur, the ability to transform into humans, and possessing cunning magical powers. However, historical records from ancient Korean history do not specifically describe these fox spirits as having nine tails. The nine-tailed fox spirit does not appear in Korean historical records until the Goryeo period and later.

In ancient Korean mythology, foxes are typically depicted as malevolent spirits with white fur. But also, there is a singular account describing a sacred fox spirit with black fur.

==== The first records of fox spirits in Korea ====
狐能化美女 狸亦作書生 誰知異類物 幻惑同人形 變化尙非艱 操心良獨難 欲辨眞與僞 願磨心鏡看

(In truth, the fox is capable of transforming into a beautiful woman, and the wild cat becomes a scholar. Who could have known that animals could take human forms, deceive, and confuse others? While transformation may be easy, it is far more difficult to control one's heart. To distinguish truth from falsehood, one must first polish the mirror of the heart.)

This passage, attributed to Choi Chiwon, a government official of the ancient kingdom of Silla in the 9th century, reflects the belief that animals could transform into humans. The fox, in particular, was believed to have the ability to become a beautiful woman. This demonstrates the perception of foxes and animals in ancient Korean society.

==== The Baeg-yeowoo (White Fox) legend ====
The Samguk Sagi, a historical text detailing the ancient Korean kingdoms, includes references to a mysterious and ominous creature known as the Baeg-yeowoo(white fox), which is often associated with bad omens. Despite its ominous reputation, the fur of an albino white fox was considered a rare and valuable item.

The King of Goguryeo, while hunting, came across a Baeg-yeowoo and ordered a shaman to interpret what omen this white fox might represent. The shaman explained that foxes were traditionally considered ominous creatures, and since this one was white, it was even more sinister. He suggested that the heavenly gods were showing a bad omen through this white fox spirit and that the king needed to reflect on his actions. Enraged by these words, the king had the shaman executed on the spot.

When the Baekje Kingdom and the Goguryeo Kingdom were nearing their fall to the Silla Kingdom, foxes and other animals were reported to have entered the royal palaces of each kingdom. In the spring of the year before the fall of Baekje, a group of foxes entered the Baekje royal palace, and among them, Baeg-yeowoo (a white fox) was seen sitting on the desk of the highest official.

==== The heuk-yeowoo (Black Fox) legend ====
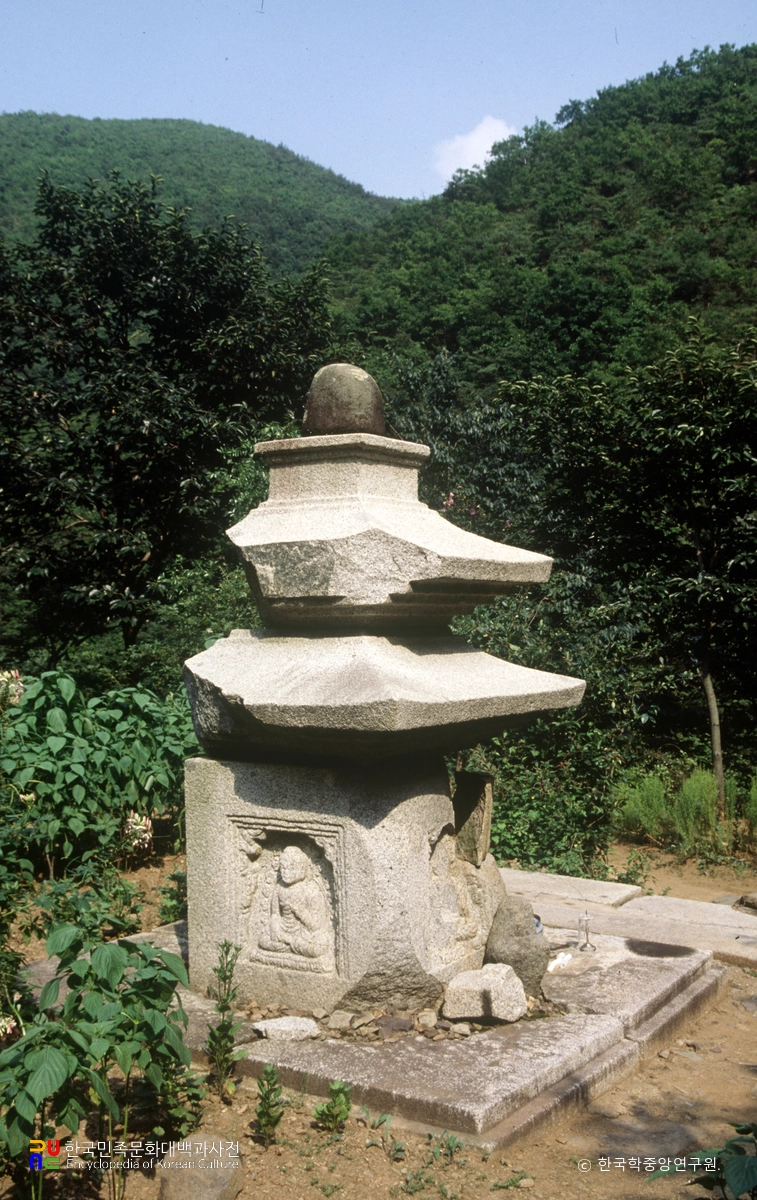
This is the collapsed stupa of Monk Won Gwang at Geumgoksa Temple in Gyeongju, believed to have been built during the Silla Dynasty. It serves as the spatial background for the myth of Monk Won-Gwang and the Black Fox. Photographed before 1986.

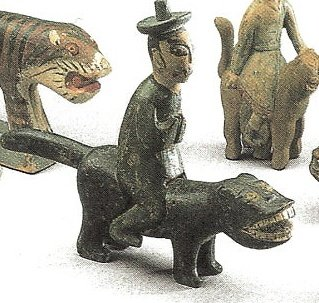
This is a traditional Korean funeral ritual tool called Kkokdu, depicting a guide of the deceased wearing black clothes and riding a black fox.

In one rare case, the heugyeou (black fox) is depicted as a sacred being that assists humans. This fox spirit appears in the legend of the eminent Silla monk Wŏn'gwang (555–638), where it serves as a guide and helper.

Wŏn'gwang a Buddhist monk of silla, entered Samgi Mountain at the age of thirty to meditate. Four years later, another monk arrived and built a temple not far from where Won-Gwang was staying, living there for two years. This monk was brave and had an interest in practicing magic.

On the sixth year, while Won-Gwang was reciting Buddhist scriptures, the Mountain god(산신) suddenly appeared to him. The Mountain god informed Won-Gwang that the monk living nearby had been practicing magic along the path, causing loud noises, and asked him to stop. The next day, Won-Gwang spoke to the monk about what had happened and suggested that he practice elsewhere, but the monk mocked Won-Gwang and ignored his request.

That night, the Mountain god appeared again and asked Won-Gwang about the situation. Though Won Gwang tried to speak evasively, the Mountain god already knew the outcome. Angered, the Mountain god caused a lightning strike that triggered a landslide, destroying the monk's temple. The Mountain god then appeared to the surprised Won-Gwang, revealed its true identity, and advised him to travel to China to learn the Buddhist teachings for the future. Won-Gwang, expressing that the distance was too far, was shown the way by the Mountain god.

With the Mountain god's guidance, Won Gwang reached China and spent eleven years studying the Three Baskets of Buddhism (Tripitaka – Sutras (經), Vinaya (律), and Abhidharma (論)) and Confucianism. In the 22nd year of King Jinpyeong's reign (600 CE), Won-Gwang returned to Silla with a diplomatic envoy Jo Bing-sa (朝聘使) from China. Upon his return, Won-Gwang visited the temple at Samgi Mountain to express his gratitude to the Mountain god.

The Mountain god then imparted the precepts to Won-Gwang and made a vow of saengsaengsangje (生生相濟), a promise to rescue each other across all worlds whenever both the Mountain god and Won-Gwang are reborn. When Won-Gwang expressed a desire to see the Mountain god's true form, the Mountain god instructed him to look toward the east the following morning. The next day, when Won-Gwang gazed at the eastern sky, he saw a massive arm piercing through the clouds, reaching toward the heavens. As a result, Won Gwang renamed Samgi Mountain Bichang Mountain (臂長山), meaning "Long Arm Mountain."

One day, the Mountain god revealed to Won-Gwang that its own death was near. On the designated day, Won-Gwang visited the place the Mountain god had mentioned and found an old fox, its fur as black as lacquer, struggling to breathe before it died.This black fox Mountain god was three thousand years old at the time of its death.

This heuk-yeowoo(black fox) is a typical example of a mountain god in Korean mythology. Korean mythology also holds the belief that when an animal attains enlightenment and reaches the realm of the divine, it becomes a mountain spirit.

==== The monster fox threatening a dragon ====
In Korean folklore, there are narratives in which an aged dragon is threatened by a fox. A hero appears, defeats the fox, and rescues the old dragon, who in return grants his daughter in marriage to the hero. The two tales to be discussed below share this same plot.

In the tale of Geotaji, a master archer, he encountered a storm while traveling to Tang China and sought refuge on an island. In a dream, he met an old man who revealed himself as the Dragon King of the Western Sea (西海若) and pleaded for help, explaining that his life was threatened by a monk. The next day, Geotaji saw a monk chanting the Darani (陀羅尼) incantation, causing the old dragon and his family to levitate helplessly. When the monk attempted to devour the dragon's liver, Geotaji shot him with an arrow. Struck by the arrow, the monk reverted to his true form—an old fox—and died. The Dragon King then appeared before Geotaji to express his gratitude and offered his only daughter as a wife. Geotaji accepted, and the Dragon King transformed his daughter into a flower for him to carry. When Geotaji's ship, escorted by two dragons, reached Tang China, the astonishing sight was reported to the emperor by the locals. Impressed by Geotaji's extraordinary nature, the emperor treated him generously. After returning to Silla, Geotaji took the flower from his chest, and the Dragon King's daughter regained her form, living with him as his wife.

The Geotaji tale is set in the reign of Queen Jinseong of Silla and is believed to have influenced the later Jakjegeon narrative. The Jakjegeon story is considered an expanded version of the original Geotaji tale, incorporating additional foundation myth elements.

In the Jakjegeon tale, the hero Jakjegeon sets out to find his father, carrying the divine bow (singung, 神弓) as a token. Boarding a Tang merchant ship, he encounters a storm at sea. Divination reveals that a Korean must be set ashore on an island. There, Jakjegeon meets an old man who identifies himself as the Dragon King of the Western Sea. The Dragon King complains of pain, explaining that a demon disguised as Buddha is reciting a spell to incapacitate him, and asks Jakjegeon to shoot it. When Jakjegeon shoots the evil spirit disguised as Buddha with an arrow, as promised, it reveals its true form as an old fox and dies. The Dragon King then invites Jakjegeon to the palace, where Jakjegeon marries the dragon princess and receives treasures such as the Seven Treasures, a cane, and a pig, before returning home. From the union of Jakjegeon and the dragon princess, Wang Geon is born, who later founded Goryeo, which succeeded the Three Kingdoms period.

These tales correspond to the motif found in European mythology in which hero slays a dragon (or serpent) to save a kingdom and, as a reward, marries a princess. In this comparison, Geotaji and Jakjegŏn parallels the European dragon-slayer (such as Perseus), the Dragon King corresponds to a royal figure, the dragon princess to a European princess, and the monstrous fox to the dragon(or serpent).Furthermore, the theme in which a hero connected with a dragon overcomes a monstrous fox and subsequently becomes a founding ancestor shows similarities to the foundation myth of Vietnam.

A later short story, Wang Sujae Married the Daughter of the Dragon King (王秀才用女取德說), which largely inherits the plot of these narratives, depicts the fox as a 3,000-year-old nine-tailed fox capable of transforming into a beautiful woman.

==== Other ancient Korean fox tales (especially the fox tales of Silla) ====
Queen Seondeok of Silla was once struck by an illness, and a monk named Beopcheok was called to diagnose her condition. However, despite his efforts, her illness did not improve. The royal court then summoned another monk, Milbon, who began reciting scriptures. As he did so, a yukcheonjang (a type of monk's weapon) struck a hidden Old fox and Beopcheok, causing them to fall to the ground below the courtyard. After this event, Queen Seondeok's illness was said to have been miraculously cured. It is not directly described in this story, but from the circumstances described by the story, a monk named Beopchuk appears to have colluded with an old fox and worsened the Queen's condition.

Bihyeongnyang, a legendary figure in Silla, was renowned for his ability to command and control divine beings. One of his subordinates, Gildal, became disillusioned with the hard labor and, feeling overwhelmed, transformed into a fox to escape. However, Bihyeongnyang discovered Gildal's transformation and struck him down, leading to his death.

===== Silla's fox god worship depicted in Chinese legends =====
During the Tang dynasty in China, a local magistrate fell under the spell of a fox spirit named Liu-Cheng(劉成). Under the fox spirit's enchantment, he became obsessively devoted to Buddhist practices, neglecting food and, eventually, even putting his own daughter at risk of being taken by the spirit. In response, a renowned Taoist exorcist named Na Gongwon was summoned to eliminate the fox spirit.

Na Gongwon managed to subdue the spirit, but Liu-Cheng had already ascended to the level of a Heavenly Fox(天狐), a celestial rank of fox spirits who serve the gods in heaven. Because of this divine status, he could not be killed.

As a last resort, Na Gongwon chose to exile Liu-Cheng to the ancient Korean kingdom of Silla. There, Liu Cheng was eventually worshipped as a deity.

The rank of Heavenly Fox (天狐), which Liu-Cheng had attained, is regarded in Chinese folklore as the highest level a fox spirit can reach—often described as having golden fur and nine tails. Liu Cheng also claimed to be a miraculous Buddhist monk, a characteristic that closely resembles those of other fox spirits found in native Silla folklore.

=== Fox spirit records in the Goryeo period ===
Perceptions of the fox spirit in the Goryeo period, which inherited traditions from the ancient Three Kingdoms, can be observed in the poetry of scholars and poets. The prominent historical figure Shin Don was also, at times, compared to a fox spirit.

==== A poem written by Goryeo official Im Chun comparing traitors to foxes ====
虎出空山舞孼狐.

When the tiger leaves the mountain, a wicked fox will dance.

正是風流今頓盡,

That is right, the flow of the wind has now suddenly ended, Your elegance has now vanished.

幾令多士涕氷鬚.

Do the tears of many scholars in the world freeze their beards?

The poem by Im Chun (1149–1182), a Goryeo official, was written in mourning for his acquaintance Kim Yeolbo. The phrase "When the tiger leaves the mountain, the ominous fox begins to dance" is understood as an expression of sorrow over Kim's death, drawing from the Korean proverb "When the tiger is gone, the fox becomes king." This saying, which carries a meaning similar to the idiom hoga howi (a fox wielding power in the tiger's name), compares Kim Yeolbo to a tiger, suggesting that in his absence, petty and insidious individuals—likened to foxes—would rise to prominence. In Im Chun's poem, the fox is used as a metaphor for cunning and treacherous courtiers. Later Korean records also show a tendency to compare sycophantic officials at court to sly foxes or even nine-tailed foxes, reflecting ongoing cultural associations between foxes and deceitful behavior in the political sphere.

==== Yi Kyubo's poem mentioning the nine-tailed fox ====
女則爲覡男爲巫.

Women become shamans and men become sorcerers.

自言至神降我軀,

They claim that a supreme spirit has descended upon their bodies,

而我聞此笑且吁.

but when I hear this, I can only laugh and sigh.

如非穴中千歲鼠,

If they are not thousand-year-old rats in a cave,

當是林下九尾狐.

then surely they must be nine-tailed foxes in the forest.

In historical sources from the Goryeo period, fox spirits with nine tails make a full appearance. The poem Nomoopyeon (老巫篇, "On Old Shamans") by the poet Yi Kyubo(1168 ~ 1241) criticizes corrupt shamans who seduce the people with lewd songs and bizarre words, suggesting that they must be either thousand-year-old rats or nine-tailed foxes. This reflects the negative perception of illicit religions and fox spirits during the Goryeo era.

Yi Kyubo frequently composed poems that portrayed foxes in a negative light. Ironically, however, this critical stance toward foxes made him the first known figure to record the term kumiho(nine-tailed fox) in Korean literature.

==== Shin Don, the Reformer Compared to a Fox Spirit ====
Shin Don (辛旽,1322~1377), a prominent figure in Goryeo history, was recorded as a spirit of a cunning fox. As a historical figure, Shin Don was a monk and a close confidant of King Gongmin, who was effectively the last monarch to hold real power in the Goryeo royal court. In Goryeo society, monks were religious figures but generally came from lowly social backgrounds, and thus Shin Don's rise to become the king's closest advisor was an extraordinary and unconventional case. He is regarded as a reformer who challenged the corrupt Goryeo political system; however, in the end, he himself was also corrupted by power and became known as a "demonic monk" (妖僧), reflecting his complex and dual nature.

Some argue that since Shin Don's deeds were recorded by revolutionary forces who eventually overthrew Goryeo to establish Joseon, many of the negative reputations attached to him are unfair. Ultimately, Shin Don's rise from a lowly background to become the king's close aide, the fact that his history was written by the forces of the dynastic revolution, and most notably that he was defamed as a cunning fox spirit—a form of slander usually reserved for female figures—ironically made him the Korean historical figure most resembling Daji, the notorious woman in Chinese history, despite being a man.

As a fox spirit, Shin Don is referred to as Nohojung(老狐精), meaning "old fox spirit."In the records that regard Shin Don as an old fox spirit, it is said that he was considered an old fox spirit because he ate black chickens and white horses and was afraid of yellow dogs.

==== General Kang Kamch'an, the fox's son ====
Gang Gam-chan (강감찬, 1020–1075) was a Goryeo military commander who famously defended the kingdom from the Khitan invasions. Over time, his historical role evolved into legend, with many folk tales portraying him as a heroic figure with magical powers. These stories, which emphasize his wisdom, strength, and supernatural abilities, were passed down through generations. A significant number of these oral traditions were collected after Korea's liberation, further cementing Gang Gam-chan's status as a revered figure in Korean folklore.

A well-known folk tale about Gang Gam-chan tells that he was born to a human father and a fox mother. This story, linked to his birthplace in Yangyang, Gangwon Province, was recorded on October 2, 1981, by Kim Seon-pung, Kim Gi-seol, and Kim Gi-hyeon from 72-year-old Kim Hyo-shin in Osaek 1-ri, Seomyeon, Yangyang.

After marrying, Gang Gam-chan's father spent his first night with his wife. She then expressed her desire to have a child who would make a name for himself. She told him to go out into the world, sleep with ninety-nine women, and return when he had made the hundredth woman his partner. After fulfilling this task, Gang Gam-chan's father returned home, and along the way, he noticed a house he had never seen before. He entered the house, and a young woman greeted him with a tray of drinks, offering him hospitality. Drunk, Gang Gam-chan's father slept with her. Before she left, the woman told him to come back on a specific day to retrieve their child. It was later revealed that this woman was not human, but a fox.

When he returned home, Gang Gam-chan's father told his wife about the strange events. On the designated day, he went to the fox woman's house and brought the child back. The child, Gang Gam-chan, had an unusual appearance due to his fox mother, but he had remarkable talents, excelling in astronomy, geography, and even understanding the sounds of animals.

One day, Gang Gam-chan's father attended a friend's son's wedding. After drinking, he and his friend argued about whose son was more accomplished. To settle the dispute, they called for Gang Gam-chan. When the groom, the friend's son, saw Gang Gam-chan, he ran into a room and hid. Gang Gam-chan yelled at him, and the groom transformed into a snake. Gang Gam-chan then used a talisman, placing it on the bride's abdomen, causing her to give birth to a large serpent. This incident led to Gang Gam-chan's fame spreading far and wide.

The folk tale that Gang Gam-chan is the son of a fox is a well-known oral tradition that has been collected in other regions of Korea around the same period. According to one storyteller of the folk tale, Gang Gam-chan, being born of a fox, was said to have had the ability to capture tigers.

The legendary figure of General Kang Gam-chan in Korean folklore is widely known as a monster-slayer who defeats various types of supernatural creatures. In these stories, Kang Gam-chan is portrayed as the son of a fox spirit, and he often confronts and defeats other fox spirits, such as Baeg-yeowoo or Kumiho. This dual perception of the fox spirit reflects the complex view of the fox sprit in Korean culture: while the fox spirit is seen as the divine origin of the hero's extraordinary nature, it is simultaneously regarded as a malevolent entity that must be eradicated.

=== Fox spirit records in the Joseon period ===
The religious status of the fox spirit significantly declined during the Joseon Dynasty, as Confucianism, which denied the existence of supernatural beings, became the dominant state ideology. However, fox spirits continued to appear frequently in popular literature of the period. With the introduction of Chinese shenmo (gods and demons) novels and the development of publishing during the Joseon era, Chinese traditions related to fox spirits were imported and assimilated, leading to more diverse depictions of fox spirits in Korean literature. Common features of fox spirits—such as the possession of a magical marble or having multiple tails—are also found in Joseon-era novels. And in many Korean fantasy novels written during the Joseon period, the spatial or temporal setting is often placed in earlier Chinese states. In these works as well, kumiho and other fox spirits frequently appear.

Moreover, depictions of the moral orientation of the kumiho (fox spirit) became more varied during the Joseon period. In Joseon literature, fox spirits are not portrayed solely as a uniformly malevolent "femme fatale" type; instead, narratives also feature trickster or morally neutral kumihos, an enemy commander kumiho appearing as young boy, fox spirits seeking to become human, and even fox spirits who begin as malevolent beings but later repent and convert to religion, becoming benevolent. This variety suggests that Joseon literati understood the fox spirit as a nonhuman being with a range of symbolic meanings, rather than as a single fixed archetype.

In the 19th century, the Joseon-era Silhak scholar Yi Gyugyeong wrote in Hoseon Byeonjeungseol (Discourse on the Disputation of Fox Spirits) that "in popular belief, the nine-tailed fox is regarded as a cunning and deceitful being, but according to historical records from China, it was originally considered an auspicious creature." This remark reflects the widespread popularity of fox spirit narratives among the Joseon commoners at the time.

==== Fox spirits appearing in The Jeon Woo-chi Story ====
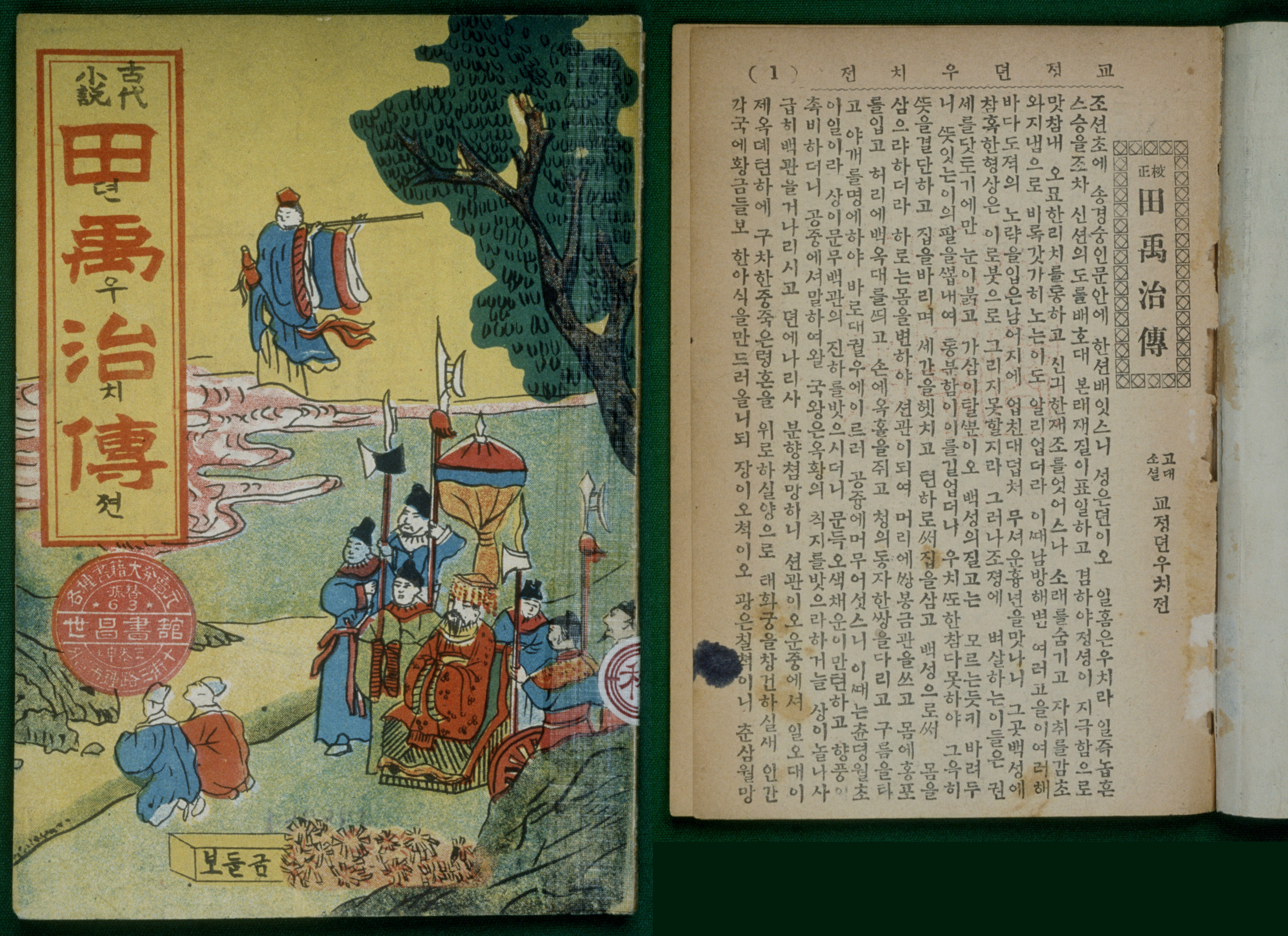
The Jeon Woo-chi Story, a Joseon Dynasty novel.

The Jeon Woo-chi Story is a tale based on a strange real-life figure from Joseon (formerly Korea) .The most well-known version of the Jeon Woo-chi Story, which originated in the 17th century, is the 47-volume Gyeongpan (Capital Edition) published in 1847. In this version, the Fox Spirit figures more prominently than in others.

In the opening of the novel Jeon Woo-chi-jeon, two fox spirits make their appearance. The first fox spirit, having transformed into a woman, approaches Woo-chi but is ultimately deceived; Woo-chi manages to steal her fox marble. The second fox spirit is a golden kumiho(or Baeg-yeowoo)—also takes the form of a woman to approach Woo-chi. This kumiho engages in a trickster's battle of deception and cunning with Woo-chi, but ultimately loses one of her heavenly books (cheonseo) to him before going somewhere.

Jeon Woo-chi, a scholar, was studying under a renowned teacher named Yun-gong. One day, on his way to visit his teacher, Jeon Woo-chi passed through a bamboo forest and saw a beautiful woman weeping. At first, he ignored her, but on his way back, he found her still crying and approached her. The woman claimed that her stepmother had falsely accused her, and her father now wanted to kill her. She said she was considering suicide but couldn't bring herself to do it.

Moved by her story, Jeon Woo-chi comforted her and encouraged her not to give up on life. As they talked, an emotional connection formed between them.

The next day, Jeon Woo-chi visited his teacher and told him what had happened. Yun-gong warned him that the woman was not human, but a fox spirit trying to deceive him. He instructed Jeon Woo-chi to go back and retrieve the fox marble from her mouth.

When Jeon Woo-chi returned, the woman initially refused but eventually allowed him to take the marble. He swallowed it, and the woman ran away in tears. Later, he confessed everything to his teacher, who told him that he had already been tainted by the fox's influence. Because of that, it would now be harder for him to fully grasp the truths of the world.

However, from that moment on, Jeon Woo-chi began to develop supernatural powers thanks to the fox marble he had swallowed.

The introduction to the first fox spirit's story adheres closely to a typical plot found in Korean oral folktales, in which a hero (or notable figure) steals a fox marble from a fox spirit. In this narrative, a female fox spirit attempts to kiss a male human to absorb his vital energy, but the man feigns reciprocating the kiss and seizes the fox marble from the fox's mouth, swallowing it to acquire divine knowledge. The fox marble motif recorded in the literary tale Jeon Woo-chi-jeon is also embodied in Korean oral folktales.

In this tale, the young scholar Woo-chi arrives at a temple after meeting a mysterious old man who gifts him a talisman and rope. At night, while studying by lamplight, a beautiful maiden suddenly appears.She claims that she was the daughter of a noble family, but lost her family to bandits and is now wandering. Her beauty and misfortune aroused Woo-chi's sympathy, but when she pleaded for a one-night stand, he began to suspect her. Woo-chi offered her a drink and proposed marriage. At first modest and reluctant, she gradually yields under his persistence, only to collapse after drinking heavily.

Sensing something amiss, Woo-chi strips away her disguise and writes a spell upon her chest, revealing that she is no human at all but a fox spirit—specifically, a golden kumiho(a golden nine-tailed fox). Binding her with the rope and striking her with sharp tools, he exposes her deception. Yet even caught, Kumiho begs for her life, saying that she can offer three heavenly books, which are more powerful than the fox's essence, and that the heavenly books are in her lair.Woo-chi, a scholar by nature, is tempted. Though suspicious, he partially frees her to follow, leading him into a cavern where she dwells in splendor among fox-servants. The attendants mistake Woo-chi for prey and rush him, but he fights them off and forces kumiho to produce the books.

Here the tables keep turning. kumiho insists she must be freed to explain the texts; Woo-chi counters with threats, refusing to loosen her bonds but extracting the teachings all the same. Overnight, he masters the first volume's arcane arts, forcing knowledge from kumiho against her will. Having gained what he sought, he pretends magnanimity—removing the talisman and releasing her with a warning never to harm human again.Kumiho appeared to be grateful and leave away, but it was only a temporary tactical retreat. Cunning still lingered in her heart.

Almost immediately, uncanny forces strike back at Woo-chi. A voice from the sky reclaims the rope he had used. Then a mysterious scholar, riding a donkey, appears, scolding Woo-chi for daring to meddle with divine texts, and vanishes with one of the volumes. Moments later, a woman claiming to be his nursemaid arrives with news of his mother's sudden death—only to disappear as another book vanishes. Woo-chi realizes too late that he has been toyed with: kumiho's illusions and celestial trickery have stripped him of his spoils, leaving him with only the single volume he had sealed with the talisman.

In this second fox spirit's story, both Woo-chi and the kumiho are tricksters, and the story unfolds as they deceive each other. Woo-chi attempts to expose the kumiho and steal her secrets, while the kumiho counters with illusions and tricks to deceive and mislead him. Both characters embody the trickster archetype, with their conflict blurring the lines between predator and prey. The outcome is ambiguous; Woo-chi gains only partial knowledge, and the kumiho survives, with both bearing the consequences of their deceptive struggle.

This kumiho also exhibits several traits associated with the Sky Fox. Like the Sky Fox, it possesses nine tails and golden fur, carries the Sky Fox's signature item—the Cheonseo ("Heavenly book")—and attempts to ascend to the heavens. In traditional Chinese Sky Fox lore, humans who seek to seize the Cheonseo typically suffer fatal or otherwise disastrous consequences. In Korean folklore, Jeon Woo-chi, however, subverts this pattern: the protagonist succeeds in stealing the Cheonseo and manages to grasp at least part of the magical techniques recorded within it.

==== Seo Gyeong-deok (also known as Hwadam) and the Nine-tailed Fox ====
A tale involving Seo Gyeong-deok, who is known as the teacher of Jeon Woo-chi, also features a nine-tailed fox. The story of Seo Gyeong-deok defeating the nine-tailed fox is included in Dongpaenaksong (東稗洛誦), a collection of Korean folktales from the Joseon dynasty, believed to have been compiled in the 1770s and transcribed by hand from the late 19th century onward.

When Seo Gyeong-deok was twelve years old, he studied at a mountain temple under a Buddhist monk. One day, the monk said to him,

"Go home for now. Tomorrow, a strange monk will come looking for you. Treat him well, and after he leaves, return here immediately."

Following the monk's instruction, Seo Gyeong-deok went home and waited. Sure enough, a visitor soon arrived—he rode a small donkey and was accompanied by two young attendants dressed in blue. The man said, "I come from Mount Taebaek. I've heard that you possess exceptional talent, so I came to see you myself."

Seo Gyeong-deok greeted him respectfully and asked questions about Confucian classics, astronomy, geography, divination, and esoteric Taoist arts. The man answered everything without hesitation. Seo Gyeong-deok was so impressed that he thought, "Even my own teacher might not surpass this man."

After the guest departed, Seo Gyeong-deok returned to the temple and reported the visit to his teacher. The monk said, "I will now undertake a special meditation. Do not ask me any questions."

He then turned to face the wall, sat cross-legged with his eyes closed and hands in prayer, and for three days neither spoke nor ate. Finally, he opened his eyes and said, "Follow me."

The monk led Seo Gyeong-deok to the top of a mountain behind the temple. There he said, "Hold tightly under my arms and close your eyes."

Then they rose into the air and flew westward. After several days, they landed, and the monk told Seo Gyeong-deok to open his eyes. But he had no idea where they were.

The monk took out a powdered medicine, mixed it with water, drank some himself, and gave the rest to Seo Gyeong-deok. Upon drinking it, his mind became clear, and he no longer felt hunger or cold. On the mountaintop stood a massive ancient tree, so large its shade stretched for hundreds of ri (Korean miles). The monk chopped five pieces of wood from the tree and then returned with Seo Gyeong-deok to the temple. The entire journey had taken six days.

Back at the temple, the monk thoroughly cleaned a room, laid out mats, and set up a folding screen. He asked Seo Gyeong-deok to lie on his back across the monk's shoulders. He then placed a table before them and took out the five carved wooden figures, painting each one a different color. The blue one was placed to the east, and the others were arranged according to their colors—white, red, black, and yellow.

With a staff in hand, the monk began to chant and wait. Around dusk, a loud commotion erupted at the village entrance. The blue figure was the first to run out and engage in battle, but it was defeated and returned. Then the white, red, and black figures each went out in turn, fought, and were also defeated. Finally, the yellow figure went out. As dawn broke, it returned victorious.

The monk took Seo Gyeong-deok by the hand, and they went outside. There lay a dead gumiho—a nine-tailed fox.

The monk said, "The guest who visited you the other day was none other than this fox. It was born in the time of Yuso (a legendary sage of ancient China) and secretly learned the ways of Heaven and Earth. It roamed the universe freely, with no deity able to defeat it.

This fox feeds on the fresh blood and organs of the noblest and most virtuous men. Upon hearing of your remarkable potential, it came to inspect you, intending to devour you. But your body was protected by divine spirits, so it waited for a moment of misfortune to strike.

To save you, I needed an object from before the time of Yuso. Only such a thing could subdue the fox. During my meditation, I searched the world with my mind and discovered that the ancient tree I later chopped was from the dawn of creation. Using its wood, I carved the five guardian spirits of the five directions, and they fought the fox. Only with great difficulty were we able to defeat it.Now, you will face no more such calamities."

Seo Gyeong-deok fell into a deep sleep. When he awoke, his master was gone.

This novel exemplifies a typical Joseon-era narrative that actively incorporates traditional Chinese folklore. This is clearly demonstrated by its reference to the legendary s of Yuso ancient China, indicating the adoption of widely recognized historical Chinese backgrounds. Furthermore, the nine-tailed fox that appears in the story is portrayed as a religious yet heretical figure who has mastered Buddhist and Taoist scriptures—a characterization that aligns with common traits found in traditional fox spirit legends.

==== The Kumiho Who Longed to Become Human ====
Myeonghaengjeonguirok (明行正義錄) is a Joseon-period novel set against the backdrop of the Ming dynasty in China. The work features a kumiho (nine-tailed fox spirit) who aspires to become human. While the motif of a human-seeking fox spirit is one of the most commonly depicted themes in modern media, the portrayal in this novel is distinct and notably more complex.

In Myeonghaengjeonguirok, the fox spirit is a thousand-year-old kumiho living in a rock cave beneath Nakhyeonam in Hyangju. One day, it witnesses the protagonist Wi Yeon-cheong briefly die and come back to life after being struck by his father. The fox secretly licks up Yeon-cheong's spilled pure blood and absorbs his vital energy. Until then, it had only fed on the qi of corpses in old graves, but because Yeon-cheong is alive and an exceptional man, a miraculous elixir (dan-yak) forms in the fox's belly—something normally made by immortals, not monsters.

With this elixir, the fox gains new magical powers and begins to dream of becoming human. It assumes Wi Yeon-cheong's appearance and lives in a small house in Cheongbyeongsan, where it is approached by Sae Hong-seon, a woman who secretly loved Yeon-cheong. She believes the fox is the real Wi Yeon-cheong and seduces "him." The fox decides to take advantage of this, planning to absorb her yin energy as well, and during their night together rolls the elixir from its own mouth into hers to use it like a fox bead while draining her vitality. However, Sae Hong-seon accidentally swallows the elixir. The illusion breaks: the fox's disguise and house vanish, revealing its true form. Realizing she has slept with a fox, Sae Hong-seon panics and draws a dagger, while the fox rages at losing its precious elixir.

At that moment, a celestial being called Cheon-an Cheonjon appears, makes Sae Hong-seon vomit up the elixir, and carefully bottles it. He praises the fox, saying that although it did not intend to, it has created a medicine that will later save Wi Yeon-cheong's life. As a reward, he tells the fox a great secret: if it receives a poem from Wi Yeon-cheong, it will be able to cast off its animal body and become human, and in time even cultivate the Way like an immortal.

The fox, filled with hope, spends ten long years in Hyangju waiting for Yeon-cheong's son Wi Cheon-bo to arrive with his father's poem. But ten years is an eternity for a still-wicked creature; unable to repress its nature, the fox ends up secretly entering the body of a man named Kang Wan's daughter and feeding on her life force, making her gravely ill. Just then, Wi Cheon-bo passes through Hyangju and stays at Kang Wan's house, hearing of the daughter's mysterious illness. When the fox sees Cheon-bo's sacred sword, it is forced out of the girl's body and reveals itself as a nine-tailed fox. Cheon-bo binds it with iron chains and is about to kill it for harming humans.

Desperate, the fox explains everything that happened with Cheonjon and the elixir. Wi Cheon-bo is a devotedly filial son; since his father has suffered ever since the near-death incident at Tojimun, he has long wished for a cure. Learning that the elixir created from his father's blood and qi is now in Cheonjon's hands, and that the immortal has already granted the fox permission to become human, Cheon-bo is overjoyed. He decides not to kill the fox and instead gives it his father's poem, which speaks of smoke and dark mist around a desolate grave, peering through a hole to steal the morning light, and, having heard the Buddha's teaching, casting off a mottled animal pelt for a Daoist's robe. By receiving this poem, the fox gains the right to shed its beastly form, become human, and walk the path of an immortal.

In this novel, the kumiho is portrayed in an unusual way: it is male and primarily harms humans by draining the life-essence of women. At the same time, however, the fox spirit ardently desires to become human, a goal rooted in the Daoist worldview that one must first attain human status before advancing toward immortality. The method by which a fox may be reborn as a human is to receive a piece of human poetry, and the narrative further extends this motif to other creatures: a fish, upon receiving human verse, is depicted as transforming into a dragon. This framework reflects a Daoist cosmology in which the higher stage of a fox is a human (or Daoist adept), the higher stage of a fish is a dragon, and in which animal spirits must obtain human recognition in order to ascend to a superior spiritual state.

==== Transmission of the Chinese Daji (the most famous nine-tailed fox legend) to Joseon ====
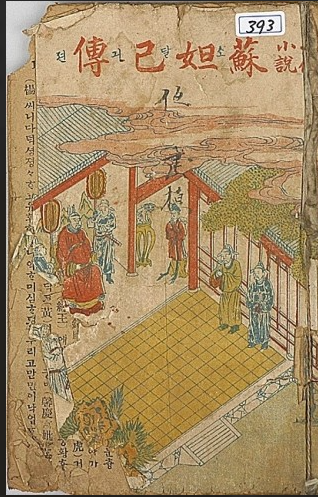
The story of Daji, So-Dal-gi-jeon, adapted into Korean during the Joseon Dynasty

The story of Daji (妲己), the most famous nine-tailed fox in East Asian classical literature, featured in the Chinese novel Investiture of the Gods, was introduced to Joseon Korea in the 17th century. The Korean reading of her name, Dal-gi (달기), became widely used, and Koreans referred to her by this pronunciation. The tale of the gumiho (nine-tailed fox) Dal-gi spread broadly, and Koreans even created an adapted version focusing on her deeds, titled So-Dal-gi-jeon (The Tale of So Dal-gi).

The notion of Dal-gi as a malevolent nine-tailed fox became widespread during the Joseon period. Her story exerted a considerable influence on Joseon literature, and Dal-gi herself appeared directly in several classical Korean novels. In Gurae Gong Jeong Chung Jik Jeol Gi (寇萊公貞忠直節記), a Korean classical novel set in the Song dynasty, a cruel character named Yu Ho-yeong is described as a reincarnation of Dal-gi. In another Joseon novel, Ssangseong Seongbong Hyo-rok (雙星奉孝錄), the character Myo-wol trains in a cave, where she remarks that "this is the place(the cave) where a nine-tailed fox once cultivated the Way, donned a human skull, and became Dal-gi." This passage reflects the widespread belief that Dal-gi deliberately used her beauty to bring about the downfall of the Shang dynasty.

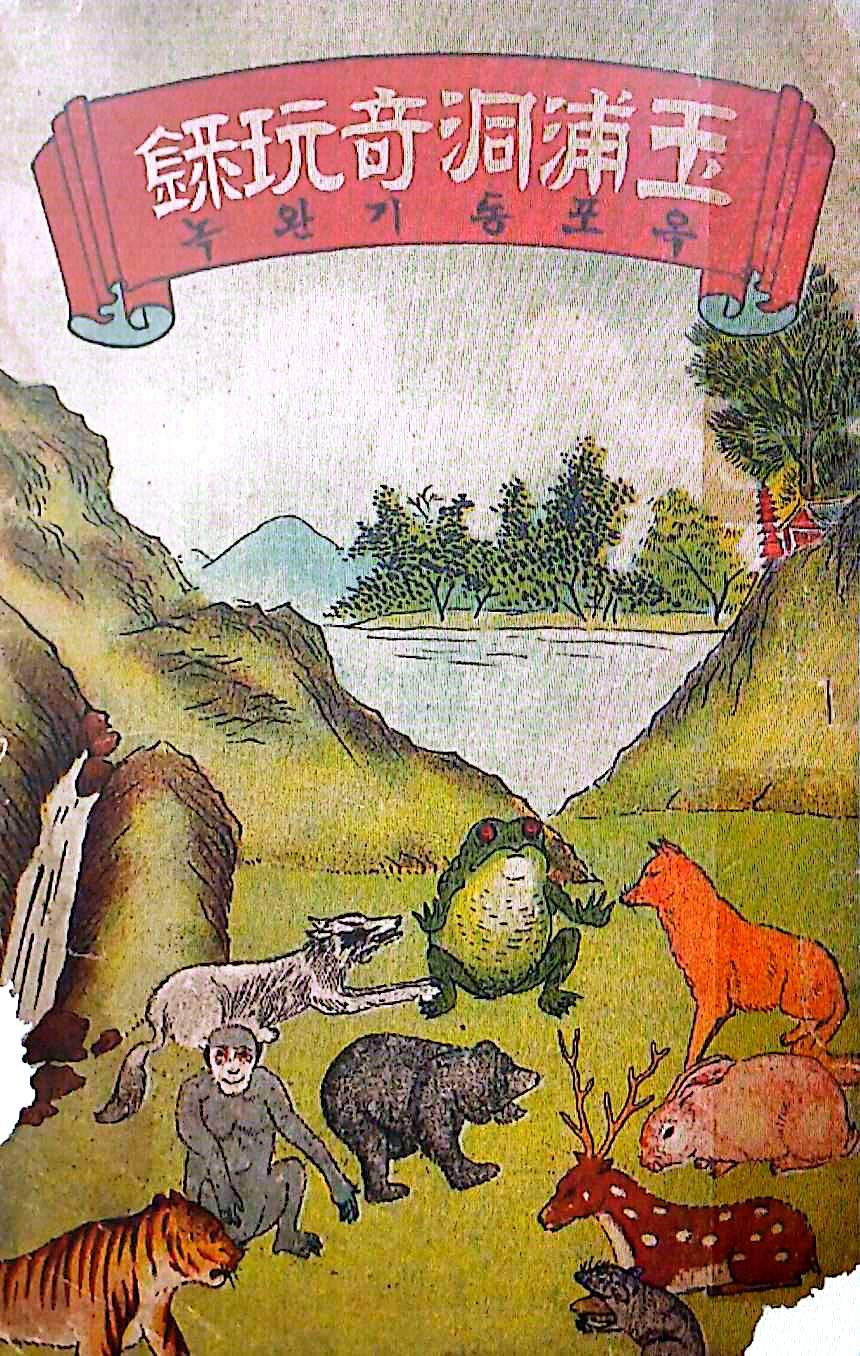
Okpodong Giwanrok, a fable from the late Joseon Dynasty

A version of the Dal-gi legend also appears in the late Joseon–period animal allegory Okpodong-Giwanrok (玉浦洞奇玩錄), which is set in Okpodong, Korea.

In this story, a wise toad recounts the deeds of various animals' ancestors while boasting of his own age and rank among the beasts. When a fox mocks him, the toad retaliates by revealing the wicked history of the fox's supposed ancestress, Dal-gi, who is portrayed as a nine-tailed fox spirit.

According to the toad's account, Dal-gi was executed for bringing ruin upon the Shang dynasty but continued to haunt the world as an evil fox spirit, spreading chaos through her descendants, including a depraved offspring named Ho-ri (狐羸). While exposing the crimes of Dal-gi and her corrupt progeny, the toad also acknowledges the existence of a virtuous line of foxes who opposed Dal-gi. The progenitor of this righteous fox clan was said to have revealed Dal-gi's true nature and aided in her capture, and their ancestral homeland was called Yeonghojin (令狐津, "Ford of the Virtuous Fox").

In the end, the fox—cornered by the toad's account and seeking a way to save face—claims that his own lineage originates from Yeonghojin, thus attempting to associate himself with the virtuous fox clan that once opposed Dal-gi.

In Korea, several place names are thought to have derived from the name Dal-gi. Near Juwangsan (literally "King Juwang Mountain"), several toponyms include the name Dal-gi, among which Dal-gi Falls and the Dal-gi Mineral Spring are the most notable.

According to Korean legends, "King Zhou" (Juwang, 주왕) of Juwangsan was a king who came from the Tang dynasty. He is therefore not the same figure as King Zhou of the Shang dynasty, Dal-gi's husband in Chinese mythology.The toponym "Dal-gi" is also believed to have originated during the Joseon dynasty, when the Dal-gi Mineral Spring was first discovered. According to local tradition, the sound of the bubbling water was said to resemble the crowing of a rooster — dak in Korean — which sounded similar to Dal-gi. For this reason, the place was named "Dal-gi." Historical records indicate that the name is unrelated to the Korean pronunciation of Daji (妲己) from Chinese mythology.

However, the fact that several place names containing "Dal-gi" (interpreted as Juwang's wife) are located within Juwangsan ("King Zhou's Mountain," referring to Dal-gi's husband) is considered by many to be more than a coincidence. As a result, many Koreans associate the local toponyms with the characters from Investiture of the Gods.

==== Fox spirit as general under the "barbarian king" ====
Because the Chinese characters for "barbarian" hu (胡) and "fox" hu (狐) are homophones, several scholars have argued that in Chinese cultural history the image of the ethnic Other was at times projected onto the fox. A similar phonetic overlap exists in Korean, where the Sino-Korean reading ho refers both to foreign tribes (胡) and to the fox (狐). As a result, this conceptual association also appears to have shaped certain Joseon-period narratives.

This idea is reflected in late Joseon–period literary works set during the Yuan and Ming dynasties, in which the king of foreign tribes—referred to as Ho-wang (Korean: 호왕; Hanja: 胡王)—is frequently linked to fox spirits. In these tales, Ho-wang is not merely symbolically associated with foxes: he commands formidable fox-spirit generals who fight on his behalf. Within the broader corpus of Joseon war tales (gundam soseol), which commonly adopt the Central Plains under the Yuan and Ming as their temporal and spatial backdrop, the protagonists' armies repeatedly confront Ho-wang and his retinue of supernatural commanders. Among these supernatural retainers, fox-spirit generals feature prominently, reinforcing the literary convention that equates foreign adversaries with powerful fox entities.

===== Ten-thousand-year-old fox-spirit general Se-yung-wang (西戎王) =====
Then Se-yung-wang began to recite a scripture (or incantation), whereupon terrifying divine generals (神將, sinjang) appeared at his side. They charged in with dreadful momentum, collapsing the battlefield where men and horses were already tangled together.

Assaulted on all sides by these fearsome spirit generals, the various commanders and common soldiers alike were struck with terror, able only to stumble about and flail their limbs in panic.

In the war tale Cheonjeong-gayeon (Korean: 천정가연; Hanja: 天定佳緣), Se-yung-wang (西戎王) appears as one of the enemy commanders who fight against the protagonists Yu Sin (유신) and Cheongpung (청풍), displaying formidable power on the battlefield.

Within this narrative, Ho-wang rules over a group of ten-thousand-year-old animal spirits—a tiger, a snake and a fish—who serve as his generals, and Se-yung-wang is likewise described as a ten-thousand-year-old fox spirit.

===== Kumiho in the form of a boy =====
Suddenly, a young boy descended from the sky and appeared before Ho-wang (胡王).

Ho-wang asked, "Who might you be?" The boy replied, "This humble one's surname is Ho, and my given name is Cheonnyeon. I have dwelled in hiding deep within the valleys of Mt. Hyeongsan for nine hundred years, never once entering the human world…

(omitted)

Ho-wang deploys a Gyoryong (蛟龍) skilled in illusions together with a kumiho as his vanguard and challenges Sagak once more.

However, Sagak repels them with the nobaekgeom and byeongnyeokdo, weapons bestowed upon him by a Daoist adept.

In the Sagakjeon (Korean: 사각전), an unusually portrayed kumiho appears in the guise of a young boy. In this narrative, the nine-tailed fox disguises itself as a youthful commander serving under Ho-wang (胡王), bearing the name Ho Cheonnyeon (Korean: 호천년). This boy-general fox spirit leads troops in battle but is ultimately defeated by Sagak, who wields the Daoist swords nobaekgeom and byeongnyeokdo, said in later retellings to be related to the legendary Songbaekdo, a blade forged from a thousand-year-old white pine.

===== The "Barbarian" King's fox spirit wife: a multifaceted character =====
In Okrumong, a fox spirit wanders the human world disguised as an unnamed woman. After secretly overhearing Baegun Dosā and Gang Namhong discussing transformation magic and immortal arts, the fox begins acting deliberately.

She transforms into a stunning woman called Sobosal and becomes the wife of Talhae, king of the southern "barbarian" state Hongdoguk. She then incites Talhae to attack Ming China, persuading him to overthrow Ming rather than remain a tributary. Ming responds by sending generals Yang Changgok and Gang Namhong (a woman fighting in male disguise). Gang Namhong captures Sobosal, and Sobosal begs for mercy, claiming her wrongdoing was partly "fated" and swearing she will leave the human world and take refuge in Buddhism. Gang Namhong—unusually compassionate—releases her, arguing that fox spirits cause chaos mainly when human society lacks virtue, and that killing them all is neither possible nor the true solution.

Later, war erupts again in the north, and rumors spread that Yaryul Seonu(A New Barbarian King)'s wife is Sobosal. Gang Namhong feels betrayed when he sees a woman identical to Sobosal and is ready to kill her, but then the real Sobosal descends from heaven. She explains that she has truly been cultivating Buddhism in the Western Paradise, while the "Sobosal" on earth is an impostor fox—a former companion who stole her name and appearance. To prove it, the real Sobosal briefly reveals a fox form to command the other fox demons, then seals the impostor and her followers into a gourd. Now having "shed the beast's body," Sobosal is no longer merely a fox demon but has become human in both spirit and conduct, living as a genuine Buddhist devotee.

Okrumong, composed in the mid-nineteenth century amid the collapse of established social orders and the formation of new value systems, has been read as articulating human ideals and aspirations through a pragmatic, utilitarian outlook. Within this framework, the depiction of the fox spirit Sobosal is notably multidimensional: she first appears as a conventional "seductive fox demon," assuming the form of a beautiful woman to entice a ruler and incite his wrongdoing, but after being captured and bound by the female protagonist, she repents and later suppresses other malevolent spirits. Sobosal ultimately succeeds in becoming human and is portrayed as attaining a higher spiritual state, a rare narrative outcome for a fox spirit. The episode also implies a religious hierarchy in which humanity is positioned above fox spirits in spiritual attainment.

==== Fox spirits with less than nine tails ====
The idea that fox spirits gain higher levels of cultivation as they grow more tails was not actively adopted in Korea. Nevertheless, several classical Korean novels implicitly suggest an internal hierarchy among fox spirits that corresponds to the number of tails they possess.

===== Fox spirits of the Country of Women =====
Im Seong, overcome with guilt, tries to throw himself into the sea to die, but is rescued by his companions.

While they continue their voyage, they encounter a ship from the Country of Women (女人國, yeoin-guk) and, at the invitation of its beautiful women, enter the land.

The queen treats them with great hospitality and proposes marriage to Im Seong, intending also to pair the nine princesses with Im Seong's men. She urges Im Seong to share the nuptial bed with her that very night.

Sensing that something is amiss, Im Seong puts off the wedding night for a day on the pretext of preparing for the ceremony. He spends the night devising a plan and puts it into action the following day. He takes a piece of hide from his sleeve and throws it before the queen. At that moment, the hide turns into a yellow dog, which rushes at the queen and bites her to death.

After Im Seong and his companions defeat the inhabitants of the Country of Women, they discover that the queen and the nine princesses are foxes with seven, five, or three tails, and that the ladies-in-waiting are also long-lived foxes.

In the late Joseon dynasty novel Taewonji(태원지), foxes transform themselves into beautiful women and establish a realm called the Country of Women. When the protagonists overthrow the inhabitants of this land, the women are revealed to be fox spirits, and the description of their tails suggests a graded hierarchy among them: the queen is said to have seven tails, the nine princesses are described as having five or three tails, and the ladies-in-waiting are characterized simply as foxes of great age.

===== The seven-tailed fox with the nine-tailed fox as his teacher =====
Ho-mi-a (Korean: 호미아) is described as a seven-tailed fox with golden fur and a disciple of Byeokjin the nine-tailed fox.

In Yui-Yangmunrok(劉李兩門錄), the portrayal of Ho-mi-a a fox spirit bearing seven tails-serving under a nine-tailed master suggests a hierarchical system among fox spirits based on the number of their tails.

==== Nine-tailed fox in Joseon Dynasty historical records ====
The Annals of the Joseon Dynasty contain several instances suggesting that the term kumiho (九尾狐, nine-tailed fox) was used as a derogatory expression to refer to officials of rival political factions.

Park Sang (1474~1530)pen name: Neoljae), a leading figure of the Sarim faction, likened the opposing Hungu faction to ominous creatures representing the four directions. In a scathing verse, he cursed them, saying:

"A male pit viper eyes me from the left,

An old owl spies on me from the right.

A two-headed serpent coils before me,

And a nine-tailed fox crouches behind my back."

=== Fox spirit tales from Joseon during the Japanese colonial period ===
==== Newspaper articles related to kumiho from the late Joseon Dynasty to the Japanese colonial period ====
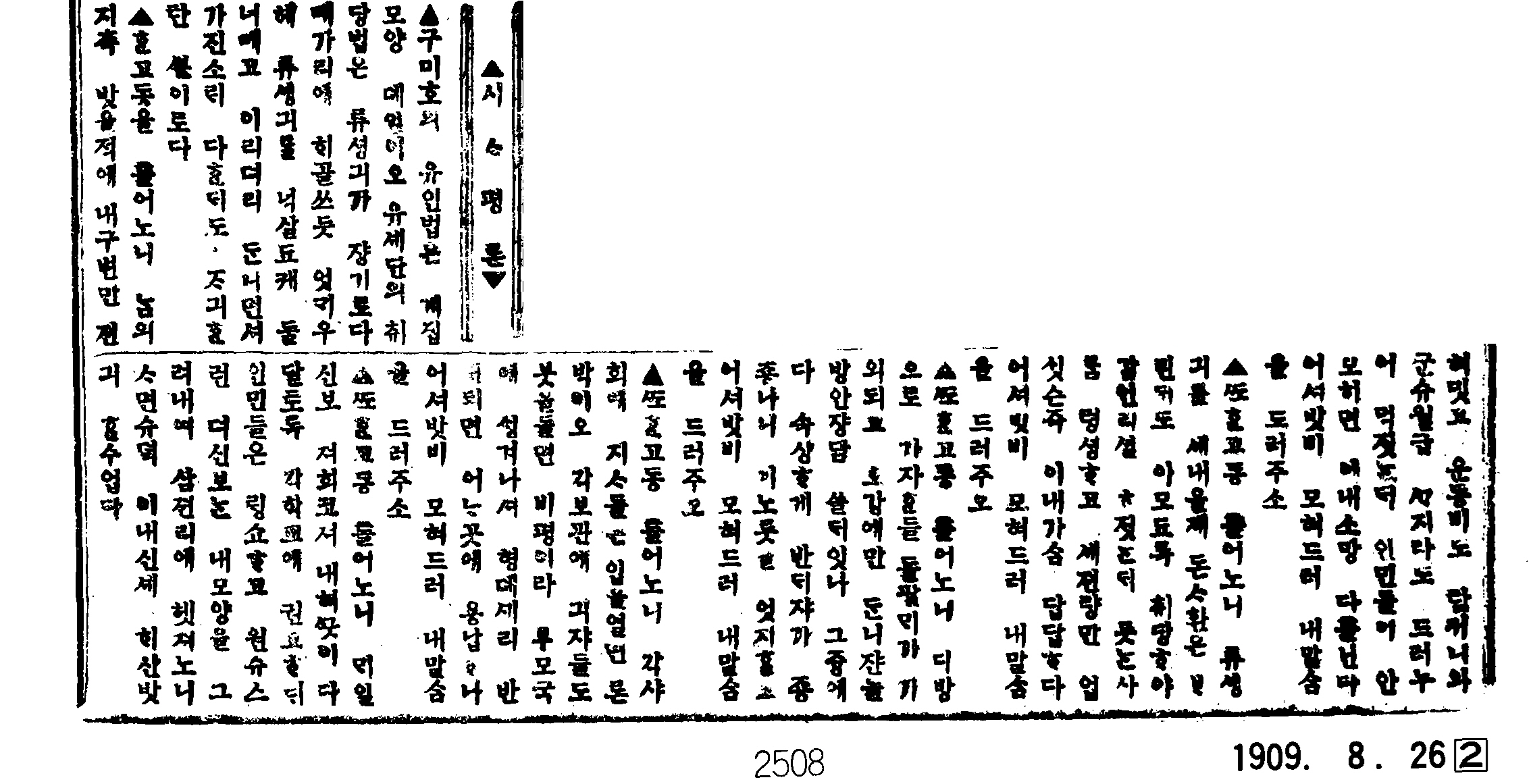
Daehan Maeil Shinbo, August 26, 1909

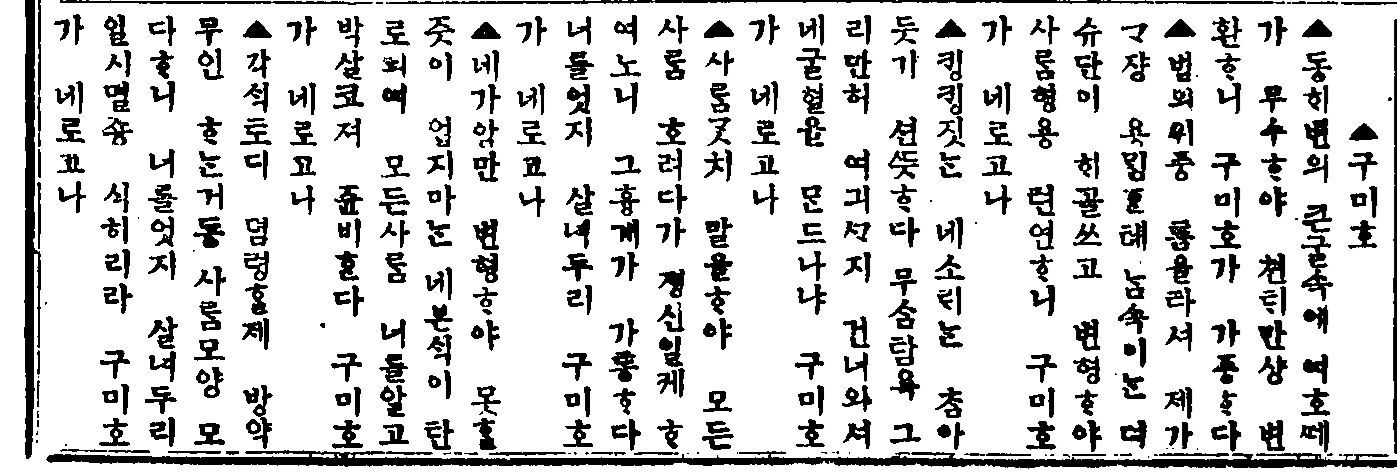
Daehan Maeil Shinbo, July 14, 1910

In the early modern Korean period (early 20th century), the term and concept of kumiho were already in use. Evidence appears in the late-Joseon newspaper Daehan Maeil Sinbo, which includes a tabloid-style report describing the kumiho's method of luring victims by transforming into a woman, as well as an opinion piece that employs the kumiho as a metaphor for a corrupt ruling class.

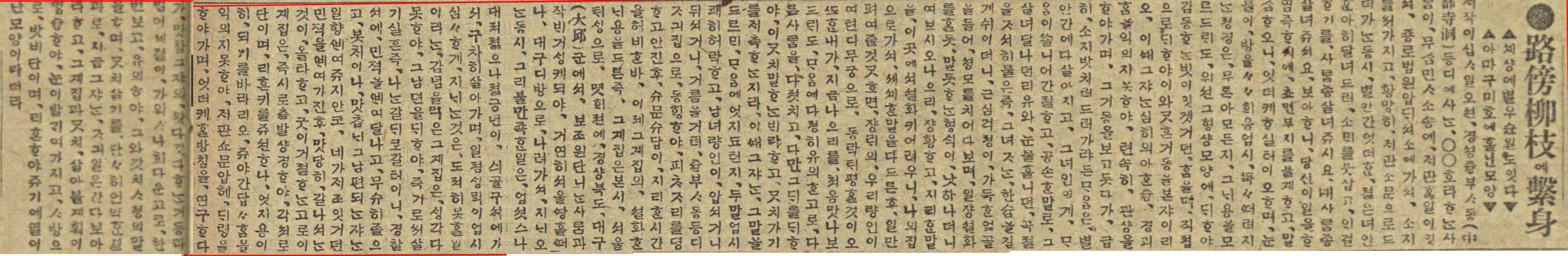
Maeil Shinbo, October 26, 1913: The victim appears to have been possessed by a nine-tailed fox

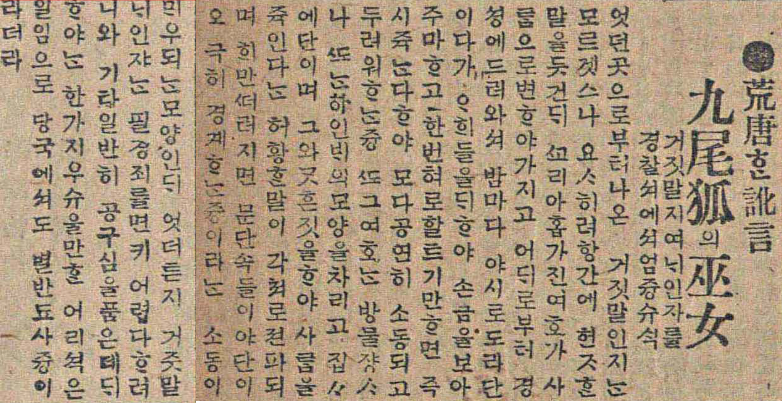
Maeil Shinbo, May 18, 1917: The Nine-Tailed Fox Shaman

After the Japanese annexation, Daehan Maeil Sinbo was renamed Maeil Sinbo, which continued to incorporate kumiho folklore into reports of unusual events. These include articles describing victims as having "fallen prey to a kumiho," as well as a piece criticizing a shaman who fabricated stories while invoking the kumiho. These examples indicate that early modern Korean newspapers frequently employed the kumiho as a narrative device, using it both in sensational ghost-story reporting and in social commentary.

==== The Mountain Goddess (fox spirit) and the Dragon King ====
In 1930, Korean historian Son Jin-tae published Korean Folktales (朝鮮の民話) in Japanese, which includes the story "The Mountain Goddess and the Dragon King (女山神と龍王)." This work reflects his effort to collect and document traditional Korean oral folktales that were circulating among the populace at the time. In the story, the Mountain Goddess is portrayed as a thousand-year-old fox spirit.

Long ago, there lived a warrior. One day, as he was walking along the beach, he saw seven boys trying to capture a great turtle with three tails and cut it into seven pieces. The warrior noticed the turtle's pleading eyes, so he bought it from the boys and released it back into the sea.

The turtle then spoke, thanking him. It revealed that it was actually the Dragon King who had come to the human world out of curiosity, only to nearly lose its life to the boys. Grateful for the warrior's help, the Dragon King returned to the depths of the ocean.

The warrior continued his wandering, and one evening he arrived at a lonely house deep in the mountains. An old woman who lived there offered him supper and asked where he planned to go. When the warrior replied that he wished to climb further up the mountain, the old woman tried to dissuade him. She warned that although many had entered the mountain, none had ever returned, for an evil demon woman dwelled there and would harm him.

But the warrior answered, "What kind of warrior would I be if I feared such things?" And the next morning, he set out to find the wicked mountain spirit.

Deep in the forest, he came upon a house where a beautiful woman welcomed him. She led him into her chamber, served him delicious food, and then asked him to marry her. "Living alone in the mountains is so lonely," she said. "Please stay here with me. I am the Goddess of this mountain."

The warrior refused her offer sternly, saying it was improper. At this, the woman flung a sheet of paper into the air. Suddenly, the sky darkened, and countless fiery blades appeared all around. The warrior trembled, realizing he could not defeat her.

Just then, he remembered his encounter with the Dragon King, and he begged the woman for a grace period of seven days. She laughed mockingly and warned him never to forget that no matter where he fled, she would be able to find him. and she granted his request.

When the warrior arrived at the beach and called upon the Dragon King, a boy appeared and guided him to the Dragon Palace. The Dragon King, along with his three younger brothers, went to the place where the Mountain Goddess of Yeosan resided. The Yeosan Goddess laughed loudly and said, "You have come seeking help from the Dragon King. But even with the Dragon King's power, you cannot kill me. Let me show you my true strength." The goddess wrote something on a piece of paper and sent it floating into the air. Three fiery blades flashed in the sky, each slicing the three dragons into two.

Once again threatened by the Mountain Goddess, the warrior requested another grace period of one month. Granted permission by the goddess, the warrior went to see the Dragon King again. The Dragon King said that the power of the Dragon Kingdom alone was not enough to defeat the woman and that they must petition the Jade Emperor to kill her. The heavenly gods sent three warriors to strike the mountain goddess. They brought fierce winds and heavy rain, pounding the mountain so violently that heaven and earth trembled. The goddess laughed loudly and said, "This time, you have called upon the heavenly gods. This opponent is strong, but let me show you my true power." She took out a piece of paper and sent something flying into the air, but she could not defeat the three warriors from heaven. Lightning struck the goddess's house, and when the goddess's dead body was revealed, she appeared as a large fox.

The warrior respectfully thanked the three heavenly warriors and, on his way home, stopped by the old woman's house who had once been the mountain goddess. The warrior restored her to her former position as the mountain goddess and went to the Dragon Palace to pay respects to the Dragon King as well.

This story is a folktale from the Joseon(Japanese colonial) period in Korea and shares notable similarities with fox spirit legends recorded in the Samguk Yusa. The fox spirit holds the status of the Mountain Goddess, reminiscent of Heuk-yeoyoo (the black fox) who aided the monk Won-Gwang. This monstrous fox is depicted as a formidable being capable of simultaneously defeating three dragons and resisting the power of the Dragon King and his kingdom. This portrayal evokes the image of the monstrous fox from the Geotaji and Jakjegeon legends.

This suggests that fox spirits were traditionally viewed not only as supernatural mountain gods but also as powerful adversaries of dragons within the local mythological framework.

=== Foxes in Korean culture immediately after liberation ===
==== Brown Fox: a modern fox allegory reflecting the Korean Peninsula ====
The comic Brown Fox (Korean: 《갈색여우》), published on 22 May 1972, uses foxes as an allegory for the political situation on the Korean Peninsula. Its protagonist, the brown fox, is the central character but is portrayed as petty, sly, and highly skilled at flattering those in power, making him a picaresque-type figure. All of the other foxes in the story, apart from the brown fox, are white.

The work is a fable that metaphorically represents the turbulent circumstances of the modern Korean Peninsula through incidents taking place in a forest inhabited by foxes. The white foxes stand for the residents of the peninsula, the wolves symbolize foreign powers and dictators, the humans represent a powerful third party that neutralizes those foreign and dictatorial forces, and the brown fox corresponds to a petty collaborator who serves the foreign or dictatorial powers but is ruined once those powers are overthrown by the stronger third party.

Although the story depicts wild foxes rather than magical fox spirits, the fox inhabitants of the forest are white-furred like traditional fox spirits. The brown fox, because of his treacherous behavior, is derisively called bul-yeowoo (Korean: 불여우), a term that also appears as one of the appellations for fox spirits in Korean folklore.

The presence of such fox-spirit imagery, even in a modern fable about wild foxes, suggests how strongly Koreans have tended to view the fox as an inherently uncanny and suspicious animal.

== List of contemporary media featuring yeowoo/kumiho ==
=== Popular culture ===
In South Korea, the anthology horror television series Hometown of Legends (Jeonseol-ui Gohyang) is widely regarded as having popularized the modern image of the kumiho. The show's kumiho episodes featured actresses in striking fox-spirit makeup that emphasized visual horror and shock, firmly establishing the kumiho as a central figure in televised horror for the general public.

The role of the kumiho was first played by Han Hye-suk in 1979, and was later taken on by many of the era's leading actresses, including Jang Mi-hee, Jung Yoon-hee, Yoo Ji-in, Kim Mi-sook, Sunwoo Eun-sook, Han Hye-gyeong, and Kim Ja-ok, all of whom either rose to stardom or further solidified their popularity through these appearances. From the 1990s onward, prominent or up-and-coming stars such as Park Sang-ah, Lim Kyung-ok, Song Yoon-ah (in the 1997 production Kumiho), Noh Hyun-hee, and Kim Ji-young were also cast in kumiho roles.

In Hometown of Legends, the kumiho is portrayed as harboring a strong desire to become human, a characterization that has come to be regarded as an influential prototype for later depictions of the kumiho in contemporary Korean popular culture.

From the late 2000s, televised depictions began to move away from traditional horror-focused portrayals, increasingly featuring kumiho characters as familiar or sympathetic female protagonists, and eventually introducing male kumiho characters as well.

Original Title	English Title	Year	Genre / Medium	Role of the Kumiho
천년호	A Thousand-Year Fox	1969	Film	Main
전설의 고향	Korean Ghost Stories	1977–1989 / 1996–1999 / 2008–2009	TV Drama (KBS2)	Main
천년호	The Thousand-Year Fox	1978	TV Drama (TBC)	Main
천년백랑	White Fox of a Thousand Years	1983	Film	Main
구미호 외전	forbidden love / The Gumiho Exorcism	2004	TV Drama (KBS2)	Main
구미호 가족	The Gumiho Family	2006	Musical Film	Main
고스트 팡팡	Ghost Pang-Pang	2007	TV Drama (SBS)	Supporting
천 번째 남자	The Thousandth Man	2012	TV Drama (MBC)	Main
구가의 서	Gu Family Book	2013	TV Drama (MBC)	Main
구미호뎐	Tale of the Nine Tailed	2020	TV Drama (tvN)	Main
러브크래프트 컨트리	Lovecraft Country	2020	TV Drama (HBO)	Supporting
간 떨어지는 동거	My Roommate Is a Gumiho	2021	TV Drama (tvN)	Main
구미호뎐 1938	Tale of the Nine-Tailed 1938	2023	TV Drama (tvN)	Main

=== Animation ===
Kumiho characters in Korean animation have been directly influenced by their portrayals in Korean television dramas, resulting in early animated depictions that emphasize sympathetic or emotionally evocative qualities. For example, the fox spirit in Once Upon a Time with Cabbage Wizard & Radish Wizard, one of the earliest known kumiho-themed animated works, is portrayed as a thousand-year-old fox with a sincere devotion to her family. Likewise, the fox protagonists of Yoranga-Yoranga and Yobi, the Five-Tailed Fox are depicted as friendly, girl-like figures.

Although some animated works do portray the kumiho as a malevolent or frightening creature—reflecting the influence of earlier horror-oriented media—such depictions have become increasingly uncommon in recent years.

Original Title	English Title	Year	Genre / Medium	Role of the Kumiho
배추도사 무도사 옛날 옛적에	Once Upon a Time with Cabbage Wizard & Radish Wizard	1990	TV Animation (KBS)	Main (Single Episode)
요랑아 요랑아	Yoranga, Yoranga	2003	TV Animation (KBS)	Main
천년여우 여우비	Yobi, the Five-Tailed Fox	2007	Theatrical Animation	Main
텔레몬스터	Telemonster	2016	TV Animation (MBC)	Main
신비아파트: 고스트볼X의 탄생	Shinbi Apartment: Birth of Ghost Ball X	2017	TV Animation (Tooniverse)	Minor (Frequently Appears in Merch)
머털도사	Meoseol Dosa (Wizard Boy Meoteol)	2012	TV Animation (MBC)	Minor
악마를 이긴 억쇠	Oksae Who Defeated the Devil	2021	North Korean Animation	Major Antagonist
새로(Cero) 소주 CF 애니	Cero Soju Commercial Animation	2022	Advertisement Animation	Main

=== Video game ===
Kingdom of the Winds, which began closed beta testing in 1995, has been recognized by Guinness World Records as the longest-running graphical MMORPG and is often cited as one of the earliest Korean-style fantasy MMORPGs. In the game, the kumiho appears as the final boss of one of its earliest dungeons, the Fox Den, and represents one of the earliest known implementations of a nine-tailed fox in an online game.

Nexon, the developer of Kingdom of the Winds, introduced a playable kumiho avatar to the game in 2012 and has actively incorporated kumiho-themed content into several of its other titles.

League of Legends, an online game developed by the American company Riot Games and originally released in 2009, introduced the champion Ahri, a kumiho-inspired character, in 2011 to coincide with the launch of the game's Korean servers. Ahri's design drew on Korean nine-tailed fox lore, and her Korean-style name was selected through a poll of Korean players on the official League of Legends website.

Original title	English title	Release(s) (game / kumiho)	Developer / publisher	Genre	Role of kumiho character
바람의 나라	Kingdom of the Winds	1995 CBT (kumiho monster); 2012 (kumiho playable character)	Nexon	MMORPG	Monster; later playable character
천하제일상 거상	The Great Merchant	2002 (game & kumiho character)	AK Interactive	MMORPG	Monster / controllable character
군주 온라인	GoonZu Online	2004 (game & kumiho mount)	Ndoors	MMORPG	Mount
귀혼	Soul Saver	2005 (game & kumiho monster)	Nngames / Hangame	MMORPG	Monster
메이플스토리	MapleStory	2003 (game); 2005 (kumiho monster); 2017 (kumiho NPC)	Wizet / Nexon	Side-scrolling MMORPG	Monster / NPC
라테일	LaTale	2006 (game & kumiho monster)	Actoz Soft Co., Ltd.	Side-scrolling action MMORPG	Monster
리그 오브 레전드	League of Legends	2009 (game); 2011 (kumiho champion)	Riot Games	MOBA	Playable champion
엘소드	Elsword	2007 (game); 2012 (kumiho playable character)	KOG / Nexon	Platform action game	Playable character
타이니팜	Tiny Farm	2011 (game); 2012 (kumiho collectible character)	Com2uS	Construction and management simulation	Collectible character
검은사막	Black Desert	2013 (CBT); 2014 (OBT) – kumiho NPC from launch	Pearl Abyss Corp.	MMORPG	NPC
로스트사가	Lost Saga	2007 (game); 2013 (kumiho playable character)	VALOFE Co., Ltd.	Fighting action	Playable character
몬스터길들이기	Monster Taming	2013 (game & kumiho playable character)	Netmarble / Netmarble Monster	Action RPG	Playable character
언리쉬드	Unleashed	2013 (game & kumiho playable character)	iustice	Tactical card game	Playable character
쿠키런	Cookie Run	2009 (game); 2013 (kumiho playable character)	Devsisters / Com2uS	Endless runner	Playable character
크루세이더 퀘스트	Crusader Quest	2014 (game); 2015 (kumiho playable character)	Loadcomplete / Hangame	Puzzle action RPG	Playable character
하얀고양이 프로젝트	White Cat Project	2014 (game); 2015 (kumiho playable character)	COLOPL, Inc.	Action RPG	Playable character
당신을 기다리는 여우	The Fox Awaits Me	2017 (game & kumiho main heroine)	TalesShop	Visual novel	Main heroine
여신전함	Girls Fleet	2017 (game & kumiho playable character)	Chengdu Jinjiao Network Technology / Hongkong Happy Game	Raising simulation	Playable character
한국사 RPG - 난세의 영웅	Korean History RPG – Heroes in Turbulent Times	2017 (game & kumiho NPC)	Twokang Project	RPG	NPC
스톤에이지	Stone Age	2000 (game); 2017 (kumiho pet)	CJ E&M	Prehistoric RPG	Playable pet
펜타스톰	Arena of Valor	2017 (game); 2018 (kumiho playable character)	Tencent / Netmarble Games	MOBA	Playable character
라스트오리진	Last Origin	2019 (game & kumiho playable character)	VALOFE Co., Ltd.	Turn-based collectible RPG	Playable character
얼티밋 스쿨	Ultimate School	2019 (game & kumiho playable character)	NetEase / X.D. Global	MOBA	Playable character
드래곤빌리지 시리즈	Dragon Village series	2012 (game); 2019 (kumiho collectible character)	Highbrow	Dragon-collecting RPG	Collectible character
가디언 테일즈	Guardian Tales	2020 (game & kumiho playable character)	Kong Studios / Kakao Games	Action RPG	Playable character
노베나 디아볼로스	Novena Diabolos	2020 (game & kumiho NPC)	H5DEV Games / Giiku Games	Occult mystery adventure	NPC
크레이지레이싱 카트라이더	Crazyracing Kartrider	2004 (game); 2021 (kumiho playable character)	Nexon	Racing	Playable character
수호신	Suhoshin	2022 (game & kumiho final boss)	No More 500	Horror, visual novel	Final boss
구미호 키우기	Raise a Kumiho	2022 (game & main kumiho character)	EK Games	Idle RPG	Main character
랜덤 다이스 시리즈	Random Dice series	2023 (game & kumiho playable object)	111%	Strategy	Playable object
크레이지 아케이드	Crazy Arcade	2001 (game); 2024 (kumiho playable character)	Nexon	Action	Playable character
블레이드&소울 레볼루션	Blade & Soul Revolution	2018 (game); 2025 (kumiho playable character)	Netmarble	MMORPG	Playable character
플레이투게더	Play Together	2021 (game); 2025 (kumiho shop NPC)	Haegin	Casual game	Shop NPC

=== Comic ===
During the 1990s and 2000s, kumiho characters appeared frequently in print manhwa. In the Kingdom of the Winds manhwa, which later served as the basis for the identically titled online game, the kumiho appears as a minor antagonist. Several romance-oriented manhwa of the period also featured kumiho characters. In Reborn Gumiho, the kumiho protagonist is depicted not as a purely benevolent or malevolent figure but as a morally complex character combining both good and evil traits, while Raon The Gumiho includes a hermaphroditic kumiho character.

Following the industry-wide transition from print manhwa to webtoon formats in the 2010s, kumiho characters have continued to appear in a wide variety of works.

Original Title	English Title	Year	Genre / Medium	Role of the Kumiho
바람의 나라	Kingdom of the Winds	1992	Comic (Sigongsa)	Minor
은비가 내리는 나라	The Land Where Silver Rain Falls	1992	Comic (Haksan)	Supporting
신 구미호 (新九尾狐)	Reborn Gumiho	2001	Comic (Daewon C.I.)	Main
라온	Raon The Gumiho	2007	Comic (Daewon C.I.)	Main
한자도사 전우치	Jeon Woo-chi: The Hanja Master	2009	Educational Comic	Main
오! 마이 로맨틱 구미호	Oh! My romantic Kumiho	2010	Seoul Publishing Company	Main
러브슬립	Love Slip	2010	Webtoon (Naver)	Supporting
미호 이야기	Miho's Tale	2010	Webtoon (Naver)	Main
쿠베라	kubera	2010	Webtoon (Naver)	Supporting
도사랜드	Dosaland	2011	Webtoon (Kakao)	Supporting
갓 오브 하이스쿨	The God of High School	2011	Webtoon (Naver)	Supporting
둥굴레차!	Dunggeulle-cha!	2013	Webtoon (Naver)	Supporting
도깨비언덕에 왜 왔니?	Why Are You at Goblin Hill?	2013	Webtoon (Naver)	Supporting
살인마 VS 이웃	Killer vs. Neighbors	2014	Webtoon (Naver)	Supporting
슈퍼 시크릿	Super Secret	2015	Webtoon (Naver)	Supporting
귀도호가록	Tales of the Fox Spirit & Ghosts	2015	Webtoon (Naver)	Main
귀전구담	Ghost Teller	2017	Webtoon (Naver)	Supporting
난약	Promise of an Orchid	2019	Webtoon (Naver)	Supporting
요괴대전	Monster War	2019	Webtoon (Naver)	Main
만렙돌파	Limit Breaker	2020	Webtoon (Naver)	Main
호랑이 들어와요	The Tiger Is Coming In	2020	Webtoon (Naver)	Supporting
호랑이형님	BARKHA / Tiger Brother	2015–	Webtoon (Naver)	Supporting
여우비 내리는 날에	On a Drizzly Fox Day	2021	Webtoon (Naver)	Main
천년구미호 (天年九尾狐)	A Millenarian Ninetails	2011	Comic	Main
요, 그리고 소녀가 검을 든다	And Then the Girl Drew Her Sword	2022	Webtoon (Kakao)	Main
여우애담	Fox Anecdotes	2022	Webtoon (Naver)	Main
여우자매	Fox Sisters	2022	Webtoon (Naver)	Main
도깨비의 밤	Night of the Goblin	2023	Webtoon (Naver)	Main
작두	JAKDU: Shaman's Blade	2024	Webtoon (Naver)	Supporting

== See also ==
- Fox spirit, a general overview about this being in East Asian mythology
  - Huli jing – a Chinese fox spirit
    - daji
  - Hồ ly tinh - a Vietnamese fox spirit
  - Kitsune – a Japanese fox spirit
    - Tamamo-no-Mae - a famous nine-tailed fox spirit in Japanese folklore
- Korean fox
- Succubus, A creature with a very similar role in Western mythologies
- Ungnyeo, a bear-woman in Korean mythology
