= Sobaeksan =

Mountain in South Korea

Coordinates: 36°57′36″N 128°29′05″E

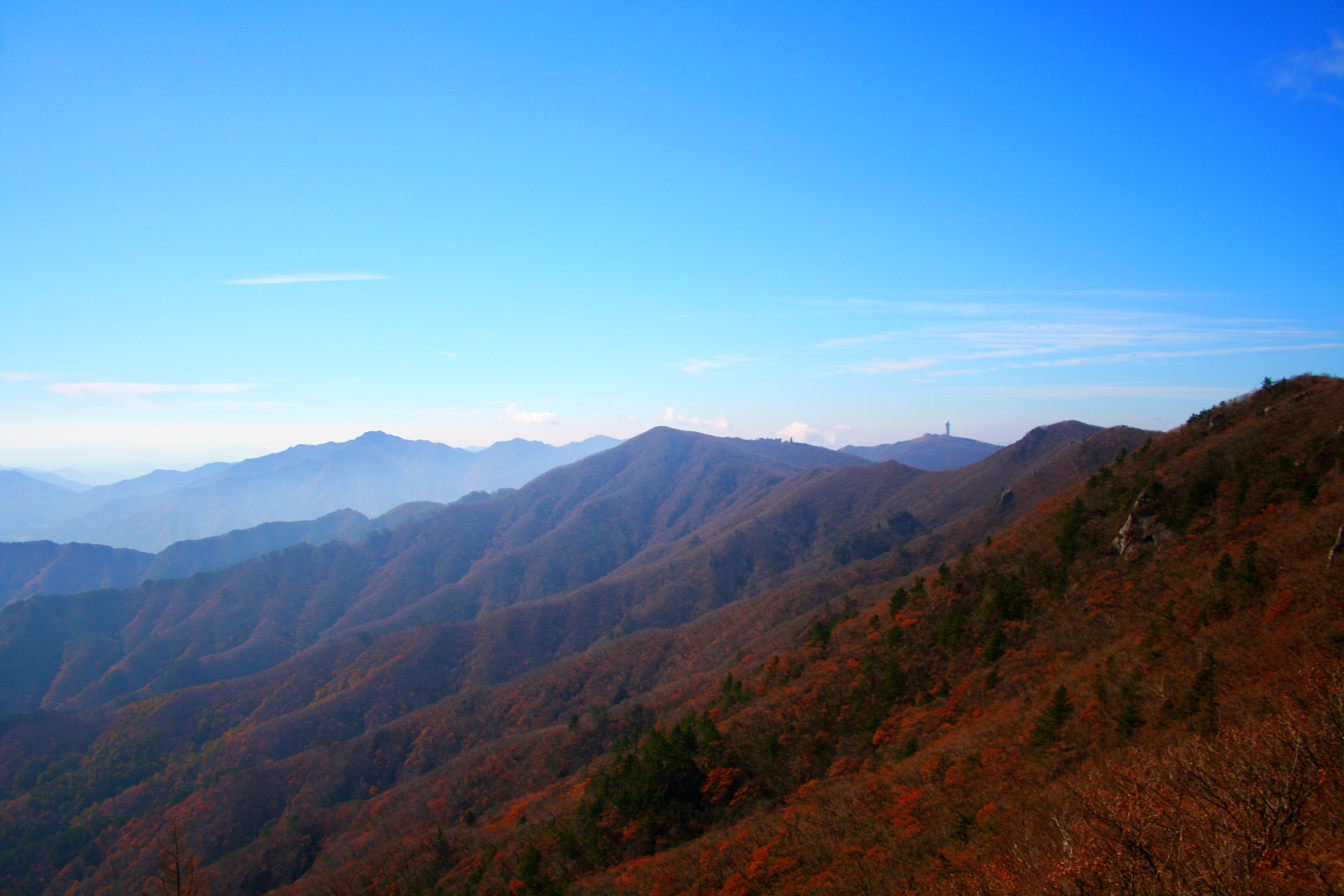

Highest point
- Elevation: 1,439 m (4,721 ft)

Geography
- Location: South Korea

Korean name
- Hangul: 소백산
- Hanja: 小白山
- RR: Sobaeksan
- MR: Sobaeksan

Sobaeksan (Sobaek Mountain) is a mountain of the Sobaek Mountains, in South Korea. It lies between Danyang County in North Chungcheong Province and Yeongju in North Gyeongsang Province. It has an elevation of 1,439 m (4,721 ft).

The Korea Astronomy and Space Science Institute operates an observatory on this mountain.

== See also ==
- Sobaeksan National Park
- List of mountains in Korea
