= Sobaeksan National Park =

National park of South Korea

- 소백산국립공원, 小白山國立公園
- IUCN category II (national park)
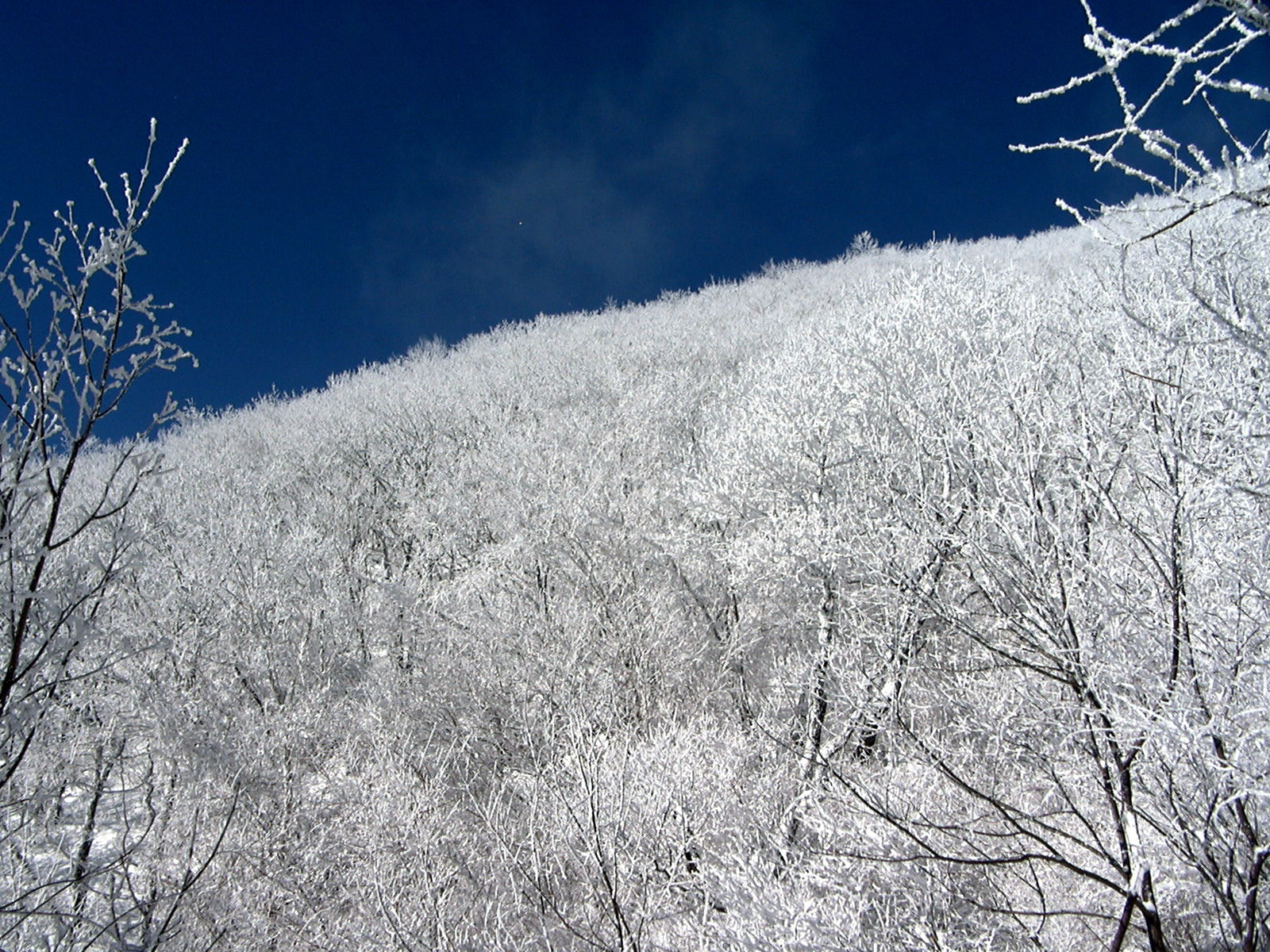
- Interactive map of Sobaeksan National Park
- Location: Chungcheongbuk-do, Gyeongsangbuk-do, South Korea
- Coordinates: 36°57′54″N 128°30′25″E
- Area: 322.38 km^{2} (124.47 sq mi)
- Established: 14 December 1987
- Governing body: Korea National Park Service
- Website: Official website

The twenty-two national parks of South Korea.
Land-based parks are in red and marine parks are in blue.

Sobaeksan National Park (Korean: 소백산국립공원; Hanja: 小白山國立公園) is located in the provinces of Chungcheongbuk-do and Gyeongsangbuk-do, South Korea. It was designated as the 18th national park in 1987. It is named after the 1,439-metre (4,721 ft) mountain Sobaeksan. The park is home to 1,067 plant species and 2,639 animal species. Reintroduction program of the critically endangered Korean foxes with captive animals from the Seoul Zoo has been run to reestablish the local population of 50 by 2020.
