= Geumsusan =

Mountain in South Korea

Coordinates: 36°59′02″N 128°15′24″E

Highest point
- Elevation: 1,016 m (3,333 ft)

Geography
- Location: North Chungcheong Province, South Korea

Geumsusan (Korean: 금수산) is a mountain of North Chungcheong Province, South Korea. It has an elevation of 1,016 metres.

== See also ==
- List of mountains of Korea
