= Danyang County =

Coordinates: 36°59′06″N 128°21′46″E

Danyang
- County
- Panoramic view of Danyang-eup

- Flag Emblem of Danyang

- Location in South Korea
- Country: South Korea
- Region: Hoseo
- Administrative divisions: 2 eup, 6 myeon

Government
  - Mayor: Kim Moon-geun(김문근)

Area
  - Total: 780.16 km^{2} (301.22 sq mi)

Population (2024)
  - Total: 27,448
  - Density: 35/km^{2} (91/sq mi)
  - Dialect: Chungcheong

Korean name
- Hangul: 단양군
- Hanja: 丹陽郡
- RR: Danyang-gun
- MR: Tanyang-gun

Danyang County (Korean: 단양군) is in North Chungcheong Province, South Korea.

== Symbols ==
- County tree: Yew tree
- County bird: Magpie
- County flower: Royal Azalea

== Geography ==
The geographical terrain is 83.7% mountainous and 11.2% cultivable. It is very rugged, except in some of the urban areas and villages that can be found in the valleys and hills. The main water system ranges from the upper stream of the 23.7 km (14.7 mi) long Namhan River, which flows through the county. Pyeongchang River, one of the streams flowing from Odaesan, joins several streams at Jungnyeong, Danyang, and Geumgok, originating from Sobaeksan. Danyang Stream, which has its source in Hakseongsan, Gyeongsangbuk-do, joins the Namhan River at Habang-ri, Danseong-myeon, together with Jungnyeong Stream flowing from Jungnyeong and Dosolsan to Hyeoncholli, Danyang-eup, Maepo Stream from Geumsusan to Dodam, and Geumgok Stream from Biro Peak to Gosu-ri, Danyang-eup.

=== Climate ===
Danyang has a monsoon-influenced humid continental climate (Köppen: Dwa) with cold, dry winters and hot, rainy summers. The county, which is situated in an inland mountainous area, epitomizes an inland climate with severe variations in temperatures. The annual average temperature reaches 11.7 °C (53.1 °F), with the highest at 17.9 °C (64.2 °F) and the lowest at 6.6 °C (43.9 °F), and its annual rainfall averages 1,049.9 mm (41.3 in).

== Tourism ==
- Gosu Cave
- Eight Views of Danyang

== Twin towns – sister cities ==
Danyang is twinned with:

=== Domestic ===
- Songpa-gu, Seoul
- Eunpyeong-gu, Seoul
- Jung-gu, Busan
- Gyeyang-gu, Incheon
- Boryeong, South Chungcheong
- Icheon, Gyeonggi
- Guri, Gyeonggi

=== International ===
- Antu County, Jilin, China
- Danyang, Jiangsu, China

== Gallery ==
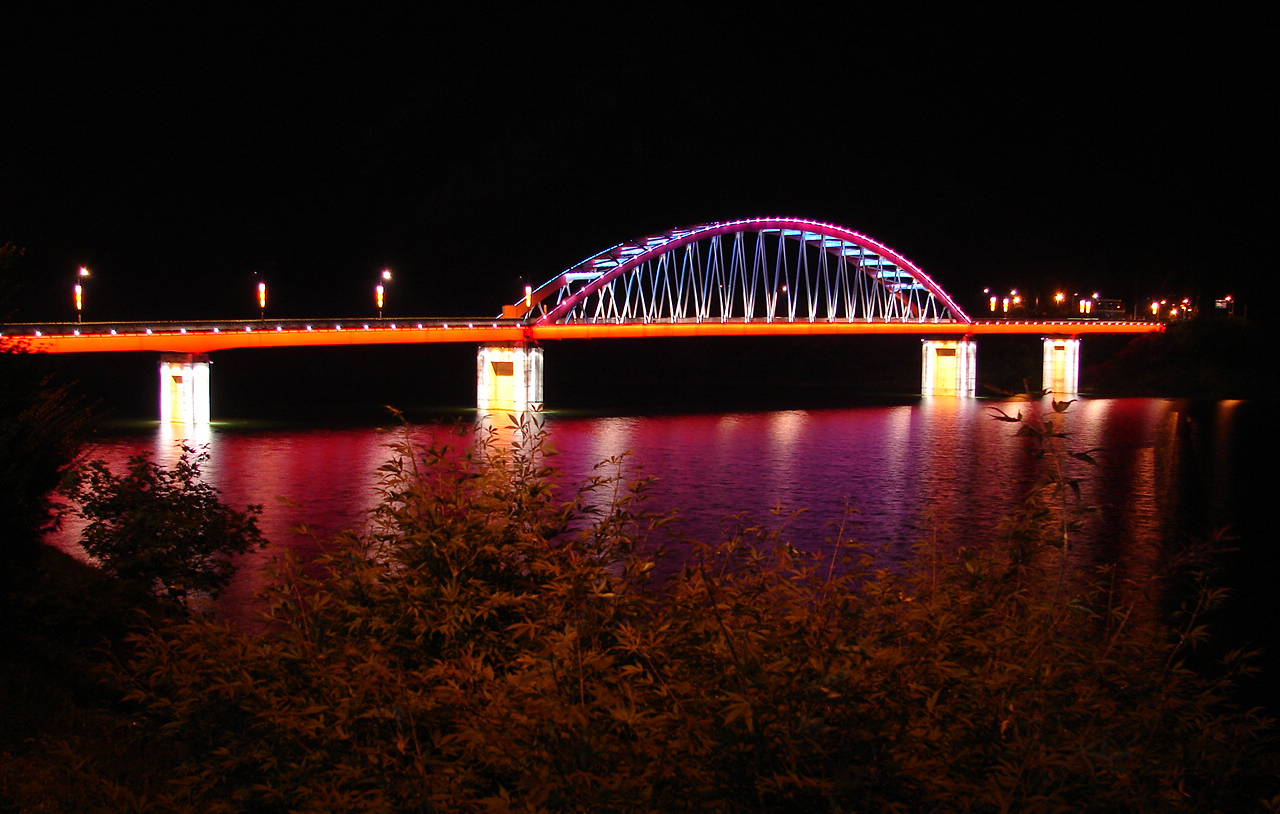
Danyang Bridge

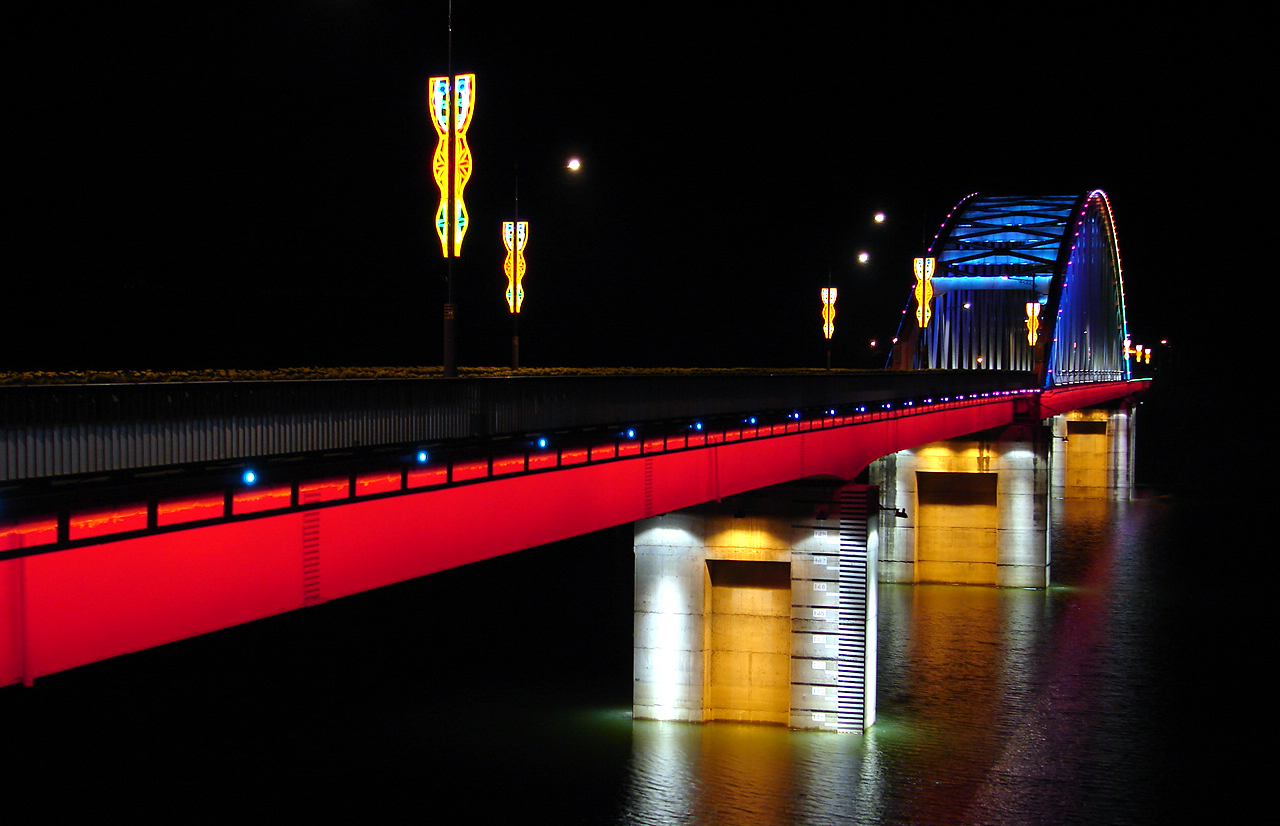
Danyang Bridge

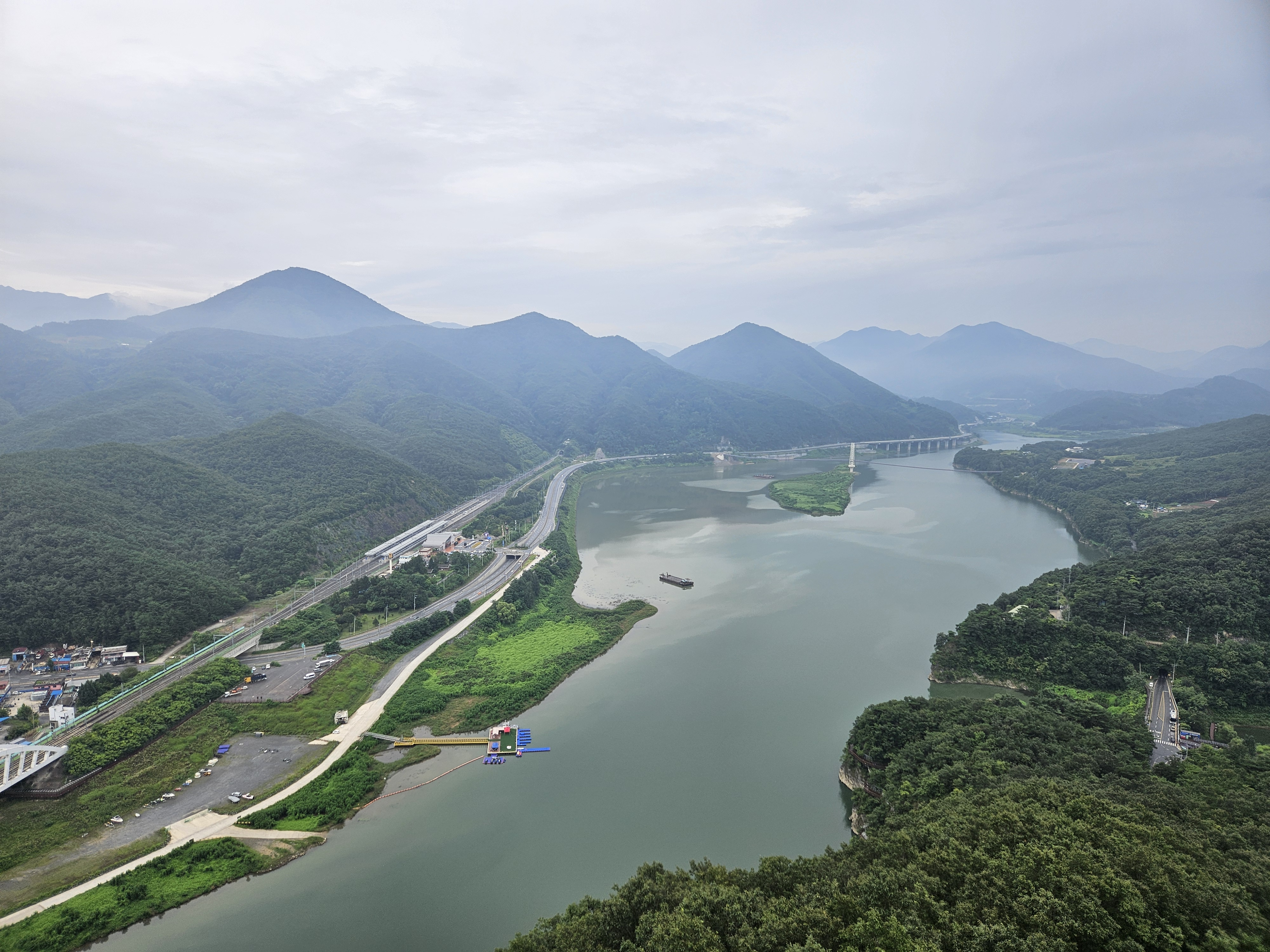
The Namhangang River flowing next to Danyang Station

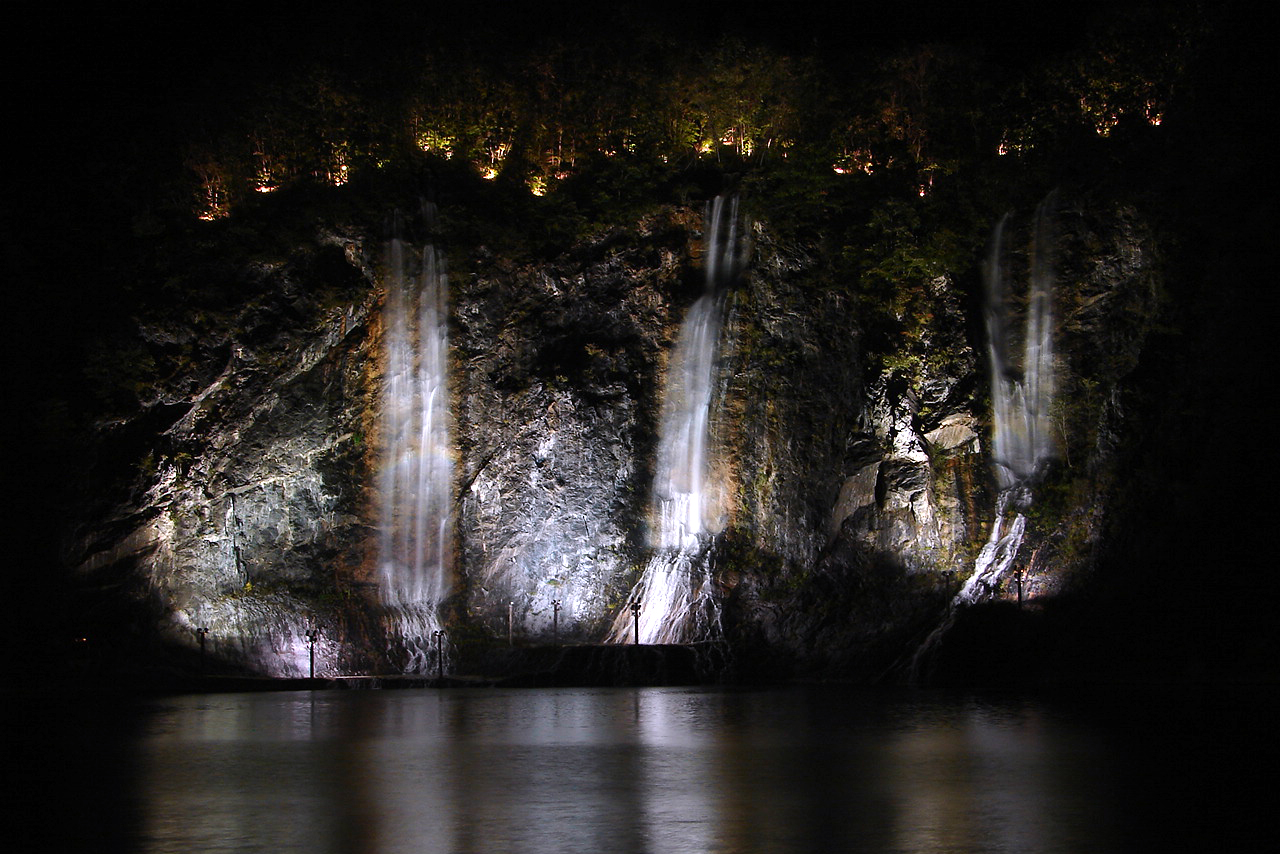
Waterfalls along the riverfront

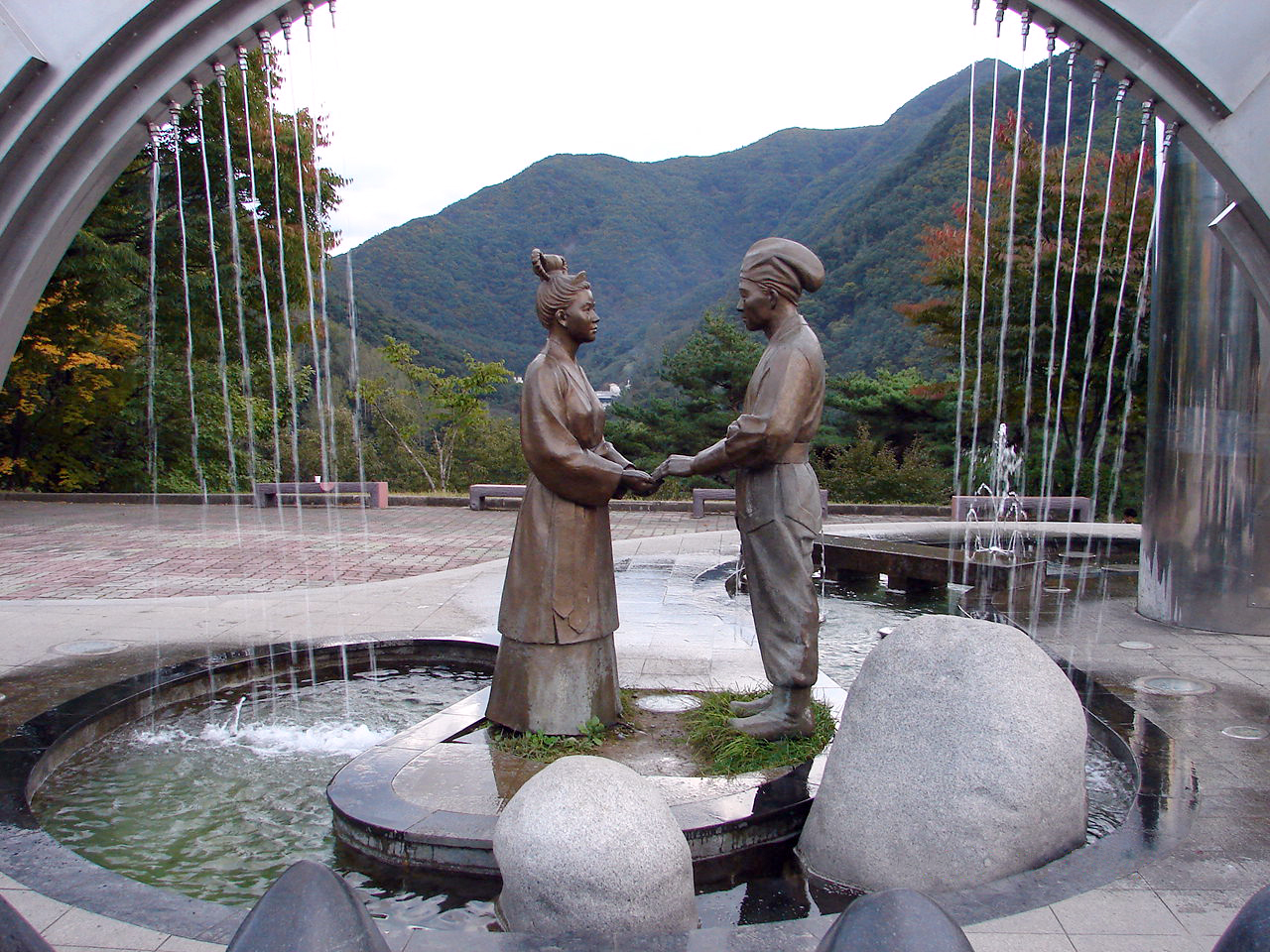
Danyang city park

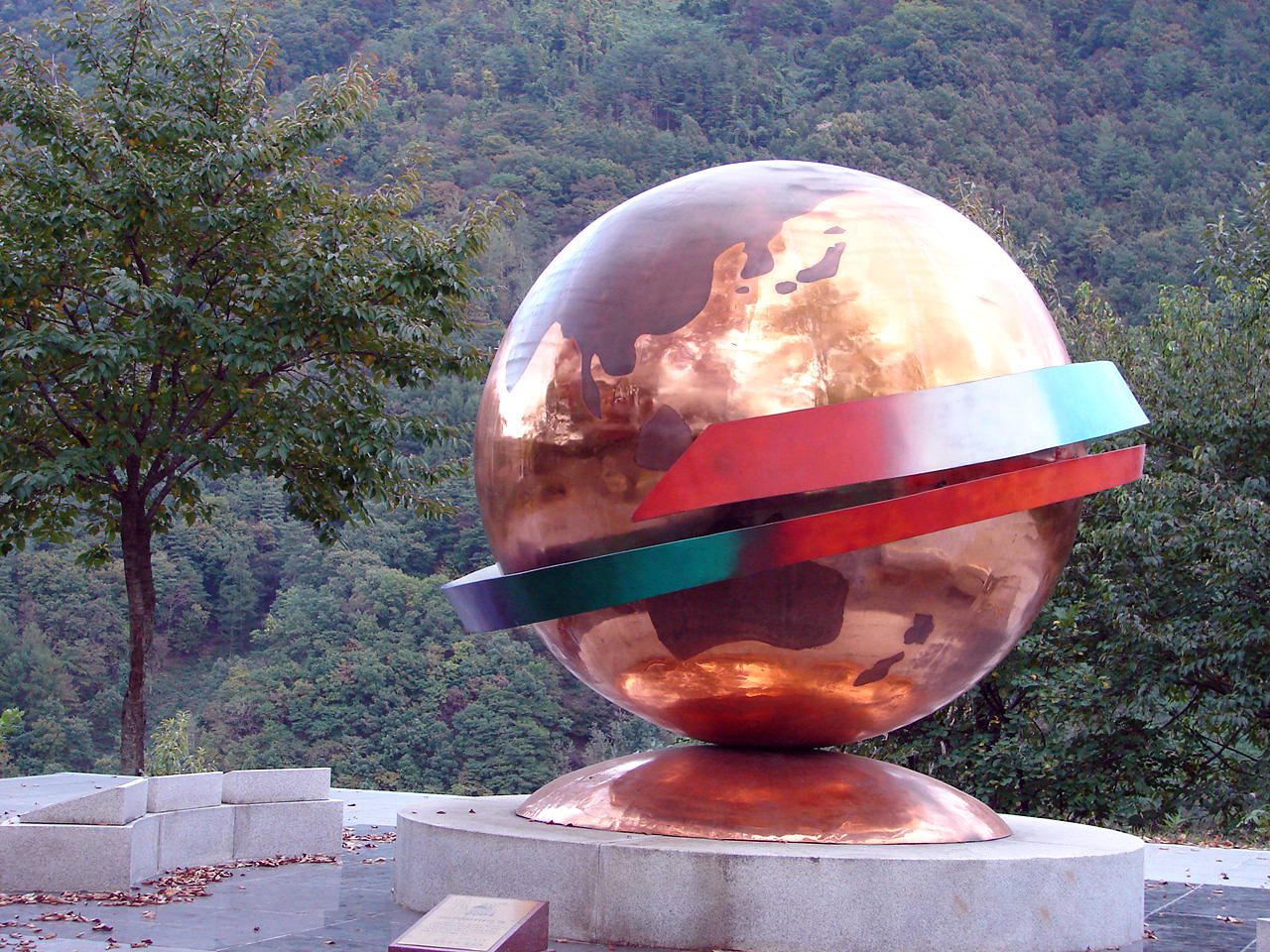
Danyang city park

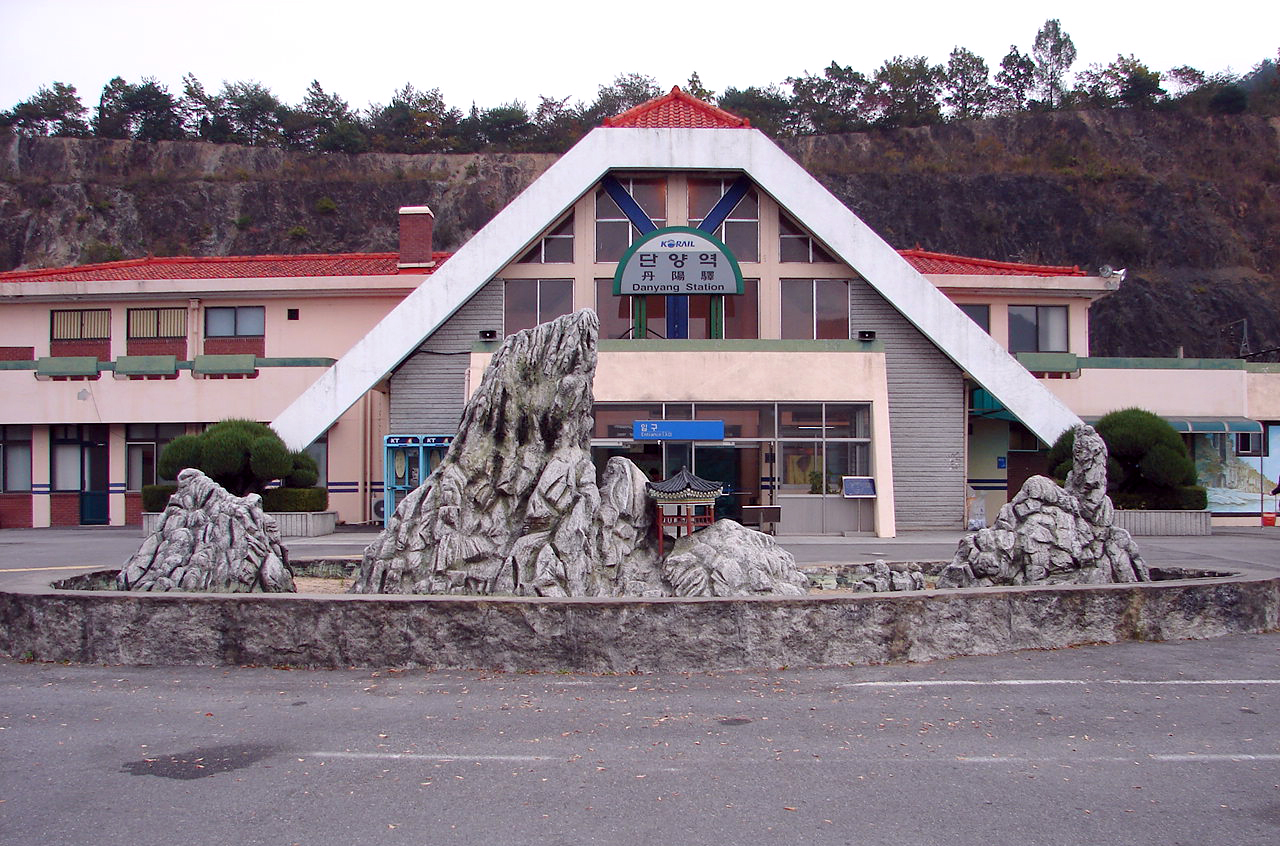
Danyang Korail Train station

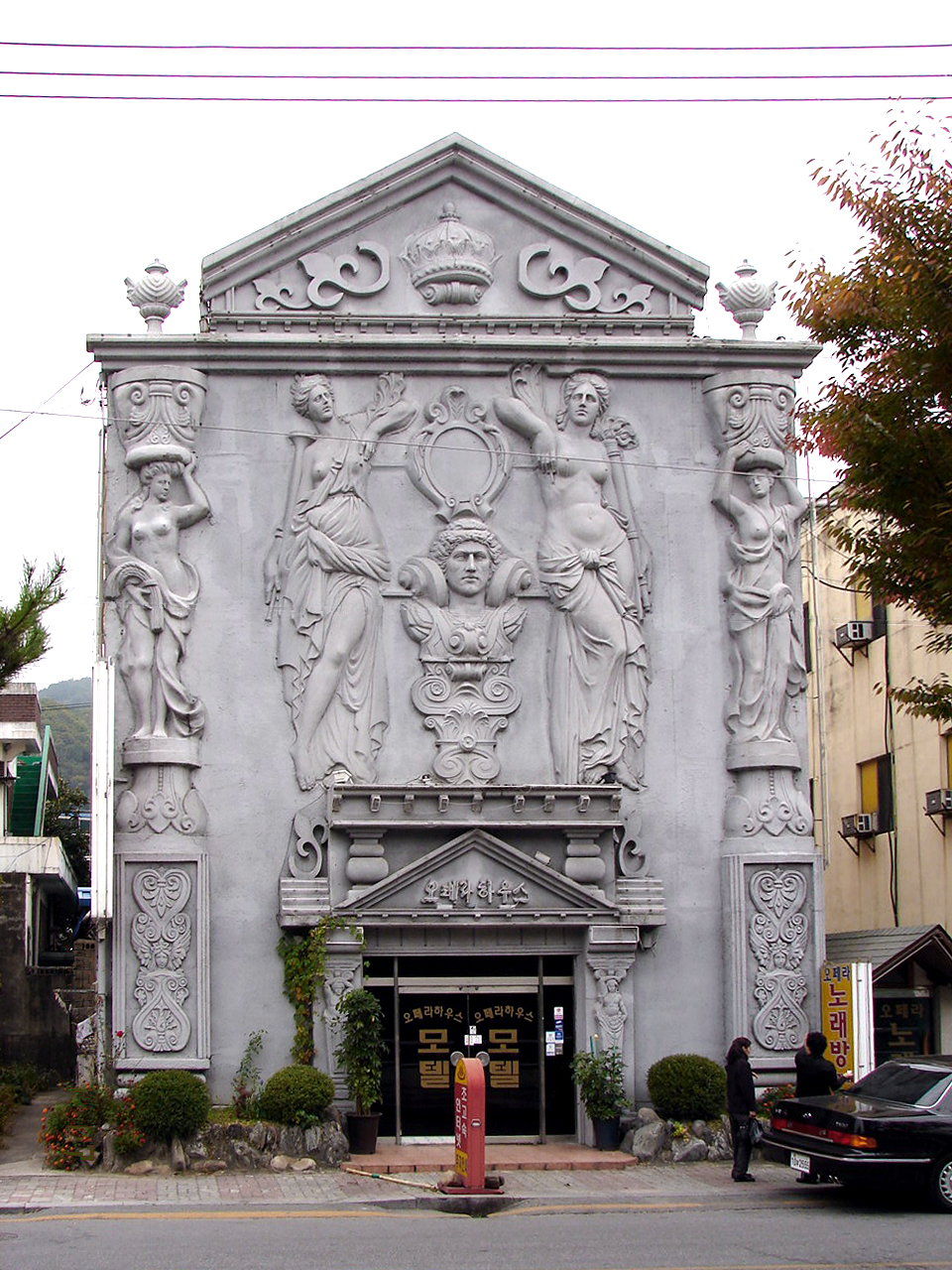
Tourist hotel typical of those along the riverfront
