= Foxes in popular culture =

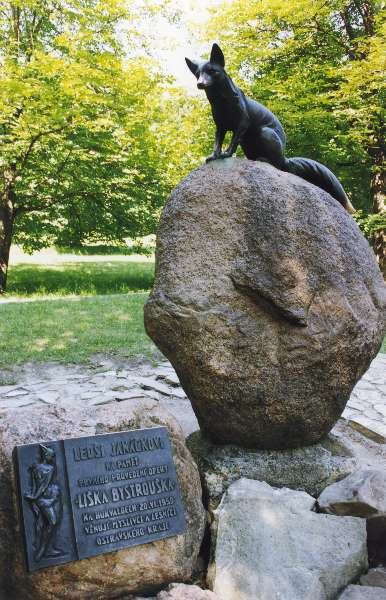
Monument of Bystrouška from Janáček's 1924 opera The Cunning Little Vixen in Hukvaldy, Janáček's hometown

Foxes, particularly the red fox, appear in the folklore and arts of many human cultures, but especially European and East Asian, as a mythical figure characteristic of cunning, trickery and deception, or as a familiar animal possessed of magical or supernatural powers, and sometimes associated with shapeshifting and seductiveness. Literature, film, television, games, music, and other forms of cultural expression may reflect the folklore image and reputation.

The term "foxy" ("having the qualities of a fox") and "vixen" (female fox) in English can also connote attractiveness, sexiness, or being red-haired. The term "to outfox" means "to beat in a competition of wits", similarly to "outguess", "outsmart", and "outwit".

== In folklore and wisdom ==
=== Africa ===
In Dogon mythology, the fox is reported to be either the trickster god of the desert, who embodies chaos or a messenger for the gods.

There is a Tswana riddle that says that "Phokoje go tsela o dithetsenya [Only the muddy fox lives] meaning that, in a philosophical sense, 'only an active person who does not mind getting muddy gets to progress in life.'

=== Europe ===
Kuma Lisa is a female fox from Bulgarian folklore and Russian folklore who usually plays the role of the trickster. Kuma Lisa is encountered with another character known as Kumcho Vulcho – a wolf which is opposite to her and very often suffers from her tricks. Veronika Makarova writes that in Western European folklore, words relating to foxes, such as French "renard", have a masculine grammatical gender, which is why Western European foxes are usually depicted as male foxes, but the word лисa (lisa) in Russian has a feminine grammatical gender, which is why nearly all depictions of foxes in Russian folklore are female.

In Scotland, the trickster figure of the fox (or tod in traditional Scots) was represented as Lowrence, as in the Morall Fabillis of Robert Henryson.

In Finnish mythology, the fox is usually depicted as a cunning trickster, but seldom evil. The fox, while weaker, in the end outsmarts both the evil and voracious wolf and the strong but not-so-cunning bear. It symbolizes the victory of intelligence over both malevolence and brute strength. In Northern Finland, the fox is said to conjure the aurora borealis while it runs through the snowy hills. When the fox’s fur touches the snow it creates magical sparks and sets the sky ablaze. Still today, the Finnish word for the aurora is "revontulet" which literally translates to "fox-fires".

An Occitan song dating from the Middle Ages, Ai Vis lo Lop, features a wolf (lo lop), a fox (lo rainard) and a hare (lebre) dancing and circling a tree. It has been suggested that the three animals represent the King, Lord and Church who were responsible for taxation (the lyrics go on to refer to money gained over the year and how nothing was left after seeing 'the wolf, the fox and the hare').

In Europe, in the Middle Ages and Renaissance, foxes, which were associated with wiliness and fraudulent behavior, were sometimes burned as symbols of the Devil. In the medieval cycle of Reynard the Fox, he is a trickster interacting with other anthropomorphic animals in a satire of medieval society.

In ancient Greek mythology, the Teumessian fox was a gigantic fox destined to never be caught. When the hound Laelaps, who was destined to catch anything he hunted, tried to catch the Temessian fox, Zeus was forced to transform them both into the constellations Canis Major and Canis Minor to solve the paradox.

=== Middle East ===
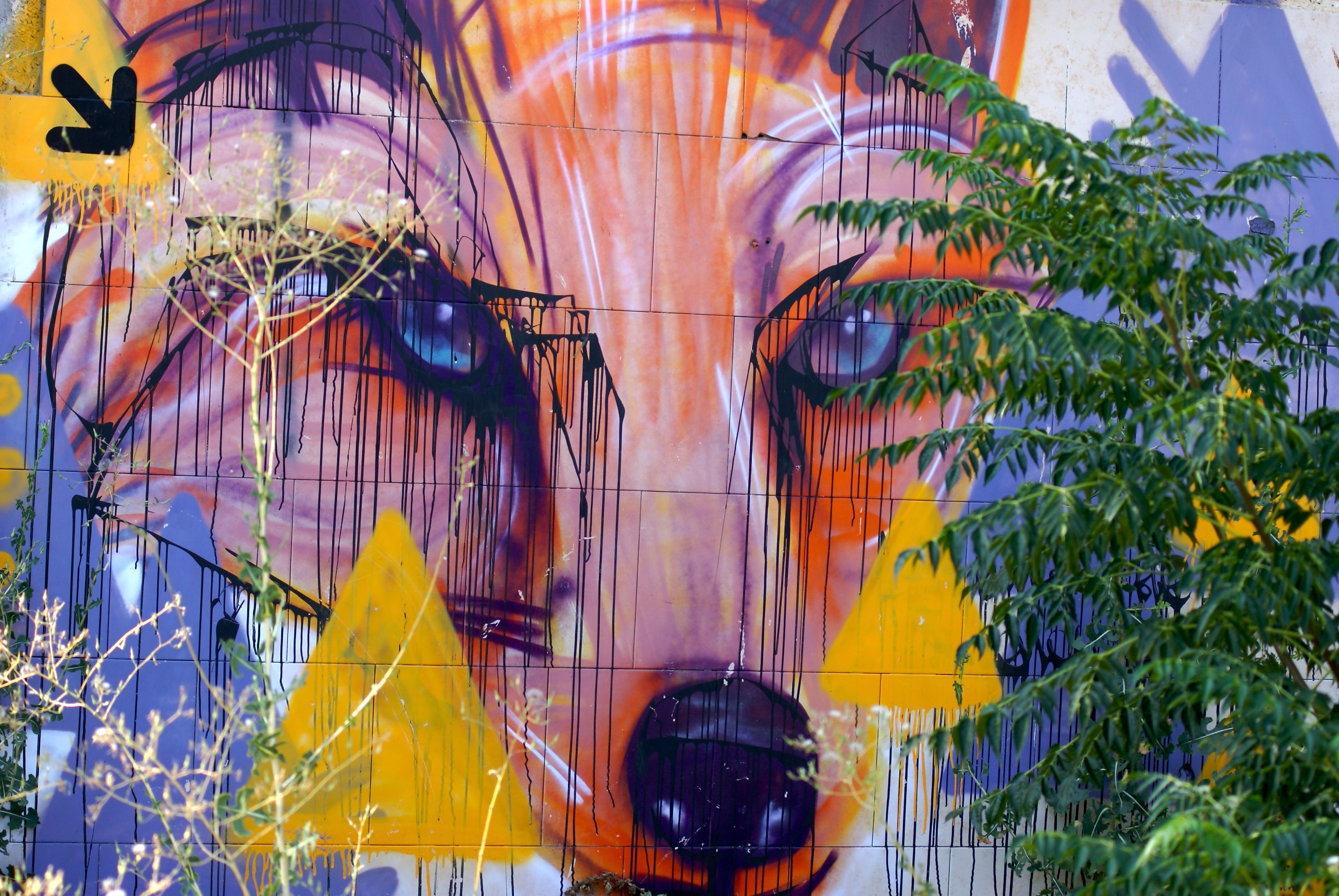
A 2011 Graffiti artwork in Tel Aviv depicting a fox.

In early Mesopotamian mythology, the fox is one of the sacred animals of the goddess Ninhursag. The fox acts as her messenger.

The Bible's Song of Solomon (2:15) includes a well-known verse "Catch for us the foxes, the little foxes that ruin the vineyards, our vineyards that are in bloom" which had been given many interpretations over the centuries by Jewish and Christian Bible commentators.

To the Jewish sage Matteya ben Heresh, of the 2nd century CE, is attributed the maxim: "Meet each man with friendly greeting; be the tail among lions rather than the head among foxes". "The head among foxes" in this context is similar to the English expression "A big fish in a small pond". "Fox fables" are attributed to Rabbi Meir and Johanan ben Zakai, and appeared in a compilation under that name by Berechiah ha-Nakdan; the term in fact refers also to fables featuring animals other than foxes.

=== East Asia ===
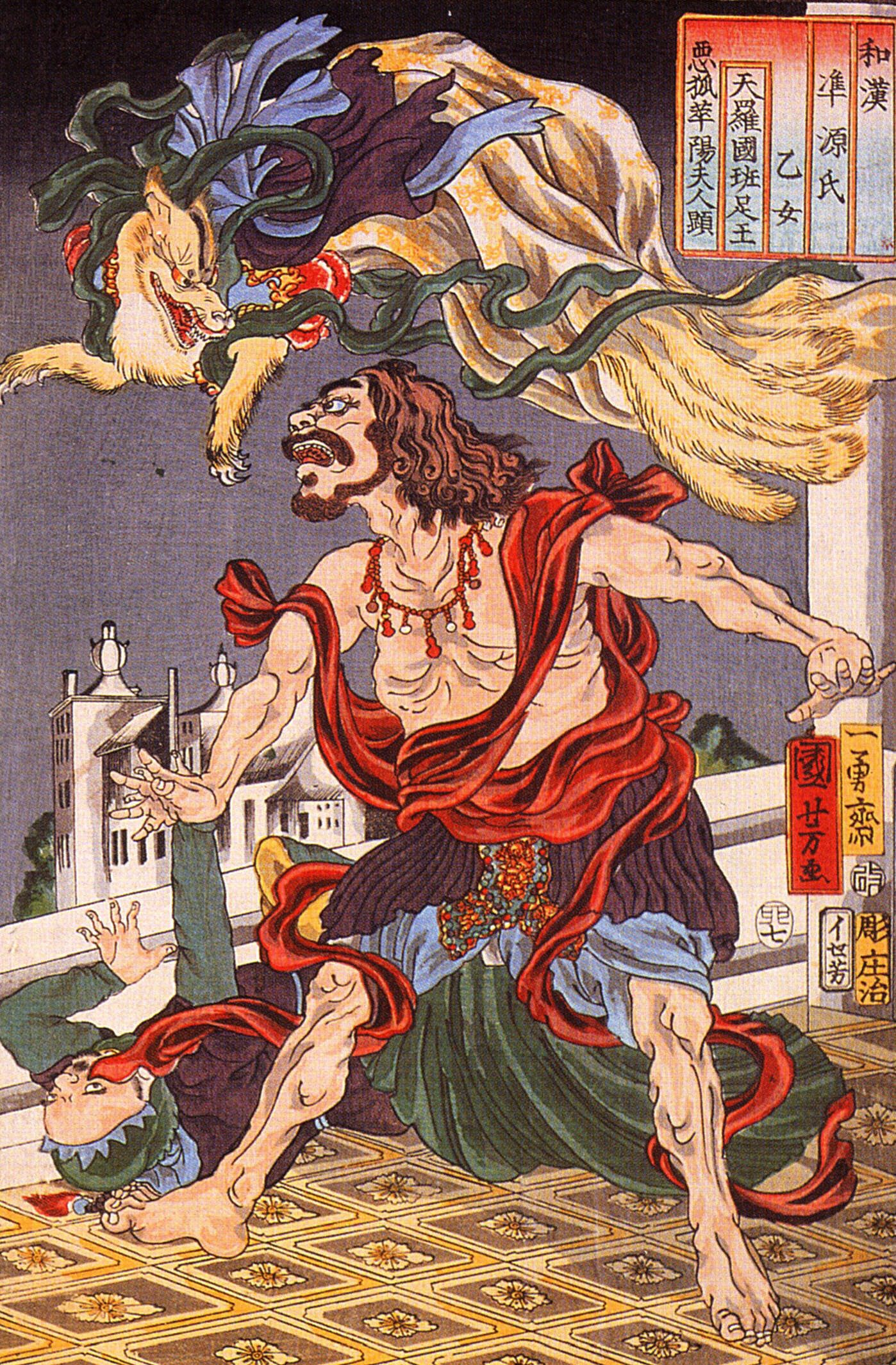
Prince Hanzoku terrorized by a nine-tailed kitsune (fox spirit). Print by Utagawa Kuniyoshi, 19th century.

In Classic of Mountains and Seas (edited by Liu Xiang in the Han Dynasty and probably composed before the Qin Dynasty), foxes eat people and predict war. In Investiture of the Gods, the femme fatale Su Daji is a malevolent vixen tasked by Nüwa to corrupt King Zhou and bring forth the fall of the Shang dynasty.

In Chinese, Japanese, Korean and Vietnamese folklores, "fox spirits" (huli jing in China, kitsune in Japan, kumiho in Korea, and hồ ly tinh in Vietnam) are powerful spirits that are known for their highly mischievous and cunning nature, and they often take on the form of beautiful women to seduce or trick men. In Modern Chinese, the word huli jing is often used to negatively describe a mistress of an extramarital affair. In ancient Korean tales, fox spirits are portrayed as anti-deities that threaten the deity-dragons. In Shinto of Japan, kitsune sometimes help people as an errand of their deity, Inari.

=== Americas ===
The Moche people of ancient Peru worshipped animals and often depicted the fox in their art. The Moche people believed the fox to be a warrior that would use his mind to fight. The fox would not ever use physical attack, only mental.

In the Uncle Remus collection of 19th-century African-American folktales adapted and compiled by Joel Chandler Harris, "Br'er Fox" is a major character, often acting as the antagonist towards the stories' main character, "Br'er Rabbit".

Vladimir Bogoraz wrote down a creation myth he allegedly heard from the Chukchi people, in which the yellow fox attempts to deceive the Creator of the world for food, but fails, and the arctic fox is cowardly.

== In language ==
=== As an epithet ===
The Medieval Norman adventurer Robert Guiscard was nicknamed "Robert the Fox" as well as the Resourceful, the Cunning, the Wily – underlining the identification of such qualities with foxes.

During the American Revolution Continental Army Officer Francis Marion became so adept at attacking and ambushing British forces in the swamps of South Carolina that he became known as the "Swamp Fox".

During World War II, the German commander in North Africa, Erwin Rommel, was grudgingly nicknamed the "Desert Fox" by his British adversaries, as a tribute to his cunning and skill in operational art.

The Italian sociologist and economist Vilfredo Pareto (1848–1923) in his Trattato di Sociologia Generale (1916) developed the concept of an elite social class, which he divided into cunning 'foxes' and violent 'lions'. In his view of society, the power constantly passes from the 'foxes' to the 'lions' and vice versa.

=== Figures of speech ===
The words fox and foxy have become slang in English-speaking societies for an individual (most often female) with sex appeal. The word vixen, which is normally the common name for a female fox, is also used to describe an attractive woman—although, in the case of humans, "vixen" tends to imply that the woman in question has a few nasty qualities.

The word shenanigan (a deceitful confidence trick, or mischief) is considered to be derived from the Irish expression sionnachuighim, meaning "I play the fox."

== Literature ==
(in chronological order)

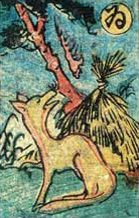
This Japanese obake karuta (monster card) from the early 19th century depicts a kitsune (fox spirit). The associated game involves matching clues from folklore to pictures of specific creatures

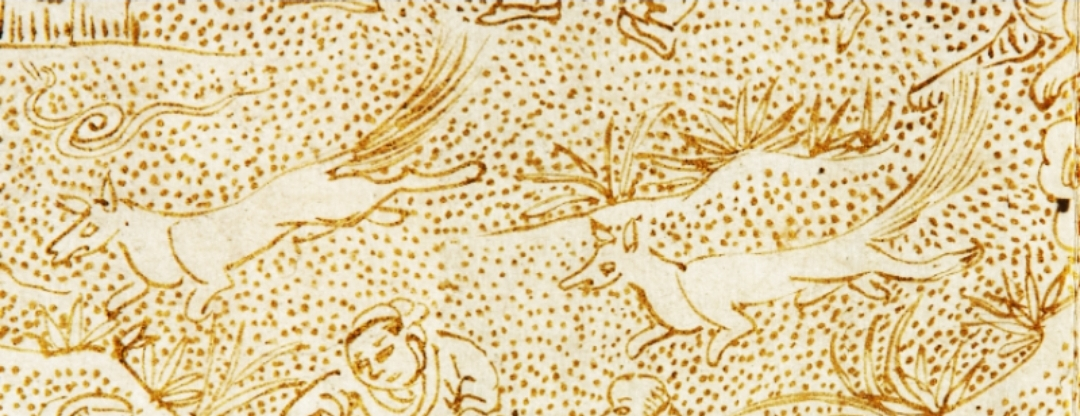
These foxes are depicted in an classical painting from the Lotus Sutra(法華經) in korea.

- 4 BC – Aesop's Fables from classical antiquity, contain numerous tales involving a fox.
- 800 – "Renshi zhuan" (任氏传) [The story of Lady Ren] by Shen Ji-ji,: Story of a love affair between Zheng and a were-fox named Ren.
- 921 – Kuzunoha: Abe no Seimei's mother is a kitsune (fox spirit) named Kuzunoha.
- 1100 – The medieval story of Reynard, a classic anthropomorphic epic.
- 1280s – Samguk yusa: A collection of legends from the ancient Korean peninsula. It features numerous white foxes and the black fox mountain god of Samgimountain.
- 1390s – Geoffrey Chaucer, The Nun's Priest's Tale, based on an incident in the Reynard cycle.
- 1480s – Robert Henryson, The Morall Fabillis of Esope the Phrygian, where the figure of the fox, as Lowrence, is portrayed in an ongoing rivalry with the wolf.
- 1532 – Niccolò Machiavelli, The Prince: The successful prince must have the traits of both the lion and the fox; as the lion cannot protect himself from traps and the fox cannot defend himself from wolves.
- 1567 - 1619 – In Investiture of the Gods (封神演義), a fox spirit named Daji manipulates King Zhou to be a tyrant.
- 1668 – Jean de la Fontaine (1621–1695), the French fabulist, brilliantly refashioned Aesop's fables into poems, including some involving the fox such as:
  - The Fox and the Crow (French: Le Corbeau et le Renard)
  - The Fox and the Stork (French: Le Renard et la Cigogne)
  - The Fox and the Billy Goat (French: Le Renard et le Bouc)
  - The Fox and the Grapes (French: Le Renard et les Raisins)
- 1679 – Pu Songling, Strange Stories from a Chinese Studio, about encounters between humans and Huli jing (fox spirits).
- 1794 – Johann Wolfgang von Goethe, The Story of Reynard the Fox: based on the Reynard story.
- 1880–1905 – Joel Chandler Harris, Uncle Remus: Oral tradition including Brer Fox, from the American South.

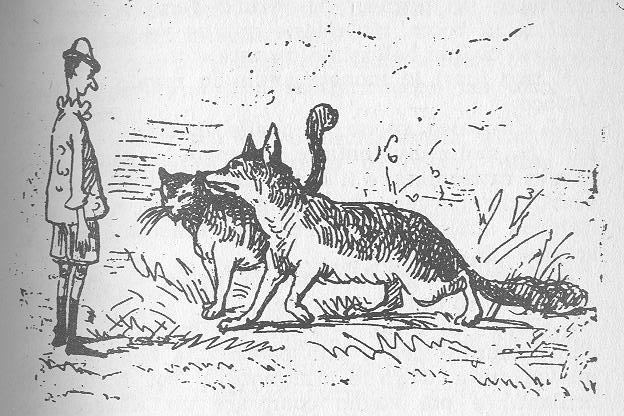
The Fox and the Cat in Pinocchio, as drawn by Enrico Mazzanti.

- 1847 – Jeon Woo-chi Story.: The protagonist, Woo-chi, and the golden nine-tailed fox are tricksters who deceive each other. Many motifs from modern Korean kumiho culture appear.
- 1881–1883 – The Fox and the Cat (Italian: Il Gatto e la Volpe) are a pair of fictional characters who appear in Carlo Collodi's book The Adventures of Pinocchio. Both are con-men who lead Pinocchio astray and unsuccessfully attempt to murder him. They pretend to have disabilities – the Fox to lameness and the Cat to blindness. The Fox is the more articulate, the Cat usually limiting itself to repeating the Fox's words.
- 1894 – "Scrapefoot". A tale with a fox as antagonist that bears striking similarities to Robert Southey's "The Story of the Three Bears" was uncovered by the folklorist Joseph Jacobs and may predate Southey's version in the oral tradition. Some sources state that it was illustrator John D. Batten who in 1894 reported a variant of the tale at least 40 years old. In this version, the three bears live in a castle in the woods and are visited by a fox called Scrapefoot who drinks their milk, sits in their chairs, and rests in their beds.
- 1905? – Ernest Thompson Seton, The Biography of a Silver-Fox, Or, Domino Reynard of Goldur Town: Realistic story with author's drawing, later made into a feature film.
- 1909 – L. Frank Baum, The Road to Oz: Fox king Dox of Foxville changes a boy's head into fox's.
- 1920 – Rudolf Těsnohlídek, Liška Bystrouška (Vixen Sharpears or The Cunning Little Vixen).
- 1922 – David Garnett, Lady into Fox is about transformation into animal, first physical, then mental.
- 1924 – Hugh Lofting, Doctor Dolittle's Circus – Doctor Dolittle, the animals' friend, hides the vixen Nightshade and her cubs in his jacket to save them from fox hunters.
- 1932 – Niimi Nankichi, Gon, the Little Fox: The fox was misunderstood, and it was shot. The moral is about the result of revenge.
- 1938 – B.B., Wild Lone: The Story of a Pytchley Fox: A novel about a fox's life in Northamptonshire, the home of the Pytchley Hunt.
- 1943 – Antoine de Saint-Exupéry, The Little Prince: A fox indicates the true value of friendship.
- 1953 – Isaiah Berlin, The Hedgehog and the Fox.
- 1957 – Ted Hughes, The Thought-Fox: A poem featured in Hughes's The Hawk in the Rain.
- 1960 – Vercors, Sylva, inspired by David Garnett where a fox changes into a lady.
- 1965 – István Fekete Vuk, about the life of an abandoned fox and his revenge on a hunter. Also made into an animated film.
- 1967 – Daniel P. Mannix, The Fox and the Hound stars a fox named Tod as one of the two protagonists. Made into an animated film by Disney.
- 1976 – John Crowley, Beasts features a genetically engineered half-human-half-fox named Reynard as one of the main characters.
- 1977 – Richard Adams, The Plague Dogs has a protagonist named "The Tod" who helps out Snitter and Rowf in their adventures.
- 1986–2011 – Brian Jacques, Redwall series: Fox characters include Fortunata, Sela, Chickenhound/Slagar, Urgan Nagru, Silvamord, Nightshade, Vizka Longtooth, and Rasconza. An animated television series based on three of the books was also produced.
- 1989 – Garry Kilworth, Hunter's Moon: The life and tragedies of a fox family which describes foxes' own mythology.
- 1989 – William Wharton, Franky Furbo: A magical fox rescues an American soldier and journeys in search of proof of the unusual story.
- 1994 – Gillian Rubinstein, Foxspell, in which a fox's god proposes that a young boy become a fox in favor to a proper burial of a dead fox's body.
- 1995 – Lajos Parti Nagy, Fox Affair at Sunset (lit. "Fox Object at Sunset"), a postmodern death poem with nostalgic irony.
- 1998 – Elizabeth Hand, Last Summer at Mars Hills: An Indian boy has a magical amulet which allows him to change into a fox.
- 1999 – Kij Johnson, The Fox Woman, in which one of the protagonists is a fox woman named Kitsune.
- 2001 and 2003 – Mordicai Gerstein, Fox Eyes and Old Country, in which anyone can switch bodies with a fox if he looks into their eyes long enough.
- 2002 – N. M. Browne, Hunted: A comatose girl wakes up in a fox's body in a fantasy world.
- 2005 – Victor Pelevin, The Sacred Book of Werewolf: The kitsune A-huli searches for a path to Nirvana for were-creatures.

=== Children's books ===
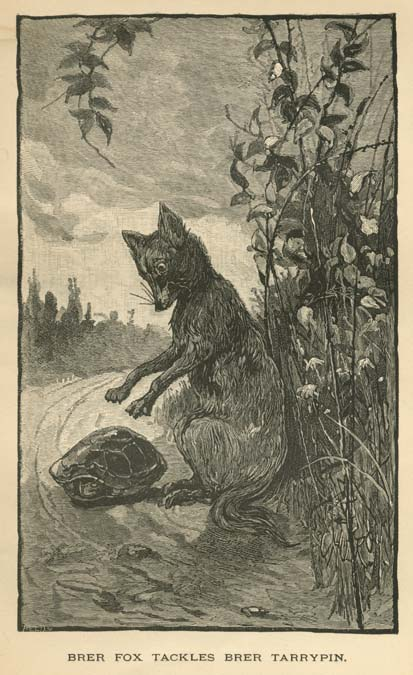
"Brer Fox Tackles Brer Tarrypin", from Uncle Remus, His Songs and His Sayings: The Folk-Lore of the Old Plantation, by Joel Chandler Harris. Illustrations by Frederick Stuart Church and James H. Moser. 1881.

- 1908 and 1912 – Beatrix Potter included foxes in her anthropomorphic children's tales—as pursuer in The Tale of Jemima Puddle-Duck and as title character in The Tale of Mr. Tod.
- 1913 – Thornton W. Burgess's The Green Forest: Reddy Fox.
- 1924 – Aquilino Ribeiro, Romance da Raposa: Portuguese adaptation of the medieval story of Reynard the Fox.
- 1961 – Peter Spier, The Fox Went Out on a Chilly Night: an adaptation of the folk song of the same name.
- 1970s – Richard Scarry, series of books that features the mechanic Fixit Fox; also animated.
- 1970 – Roald Dahl, Fantastic Mr. Fox: Mr. and Mrs. Fox and their four pups.
- 1972 – Nonny Hogrogian's children's book "One Fine Day": a story of a fox that has its tail chopped off.
- 1982 – William Steig's children's book Dr. Desoto contains an unnamed vulpine patient.
- 1998 – Michel Gagné, A Search for Meaning: The Story of Rex: Continues in comics magazine Flight.
- 1999 and 2004 – Julia Donaldson's books The Gruffalo, in which a fox is one of the three animals aside from the titular Gruffalo that the mouse encounters, and its sequel The Gruffalo's Child, in which the fox reappears along with the other two animals from the previous book, this time encountered by the Gruffalo's Child.
- 2006 – Ali Sparkes, Finding the Fox: the first of a series of novels about a boy who has the ability to change into a fox.
- 1965 – Dr. Seuss, "Fox in Socks", a story about tongue-twisters.
- 1966–1976 – David Thomson, "Danny Fox" book series.
- 2013 – Ylvis and Svein Nyhus, "What Does the Fox Say?", picture book based on the viral hit song "The Fox (What Does the Fox Say?)".
- 2015–2024: Agent Ellen Fox from Aaron Blabey's book series The Bad Guys. She serves as the basis for the character Diane Foxington in the DreamWorks Animation franchise of the same name.
- 2016 – Jonathan Schork, "The Love of Simon Fox", in which a talking fox living in an enchanted forest befriends a little girl.

== Film and television ==
=== Animation ===
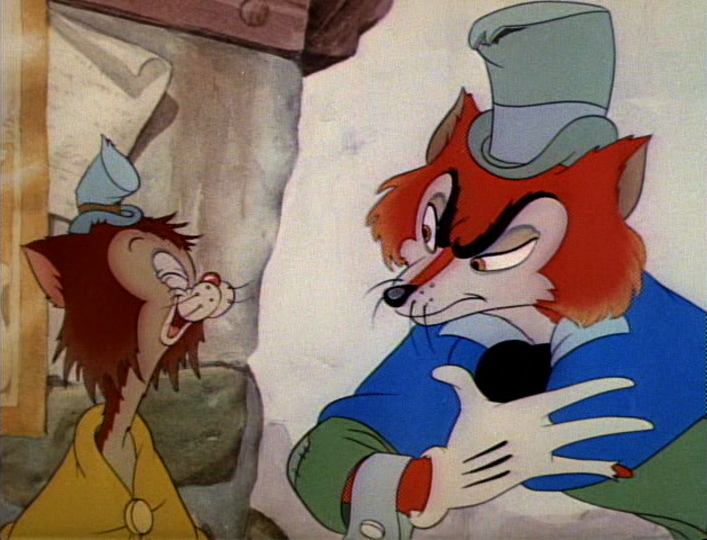
Honest John (right) in Pinocchio (1940)

- 1937 – Ladislas Starevich's puppet-animated feature film, Le Roman de Renard ("The Tale of the Fox").
- 1940 – Disney's Pinocchio: J. Worthington Foulfellow (also known as Honest John, and ironically is extremely dishonest).
- 1941–1950 – Screen Gems The Fox and the Crow: Fauntleroy Fox, one of the principal characters of the animated film series.
- 1946 – Disney's Song of the South: Brer Fox.
- 1960 – Hanna Barbera's Yogi Bear series had short cartoons, Yakky Doodle, in which the duckling is pursued by Fibber Fox.
- 1964 – The Irish-accented fox from the animated interlude in Disney's Mary Poppins
- 1972 – Ralph Bakshi's 1972 film Fritz the Cat: Winston Schwartz, the on-and-off-again girlfriend of Fritz.
- 1973 – Disney's Robin Hood: Robin Hood and Maid Marian
- 1973 – Zuiyo Eizo episodes Fables of the Green Forest based on the book The Green Forest.
- 1980s – The World of David the Gnome, animated show, Swift
- 1980s – Lis Leon, Polish animated show
- 1981 – Disney's The Fox and the Hound: Tod and Vixey;
- 1981 – Attila Dargay's Vuk, a young fox who is one of the most famous Hungarian cartoon characters.
- 1982 – The Plague Dogs, based on the book.
- 1985 – A French animated series, Moi Renart.
- 1986 – Hospital Radio's The Space Gypsy Adventures: D.C. Bones, D.C. Fusky, Gemma and Damien Mildury (animated).
- 1986 – Dutch TV series The Bluffers: Sharpy, one of the main protagonists.
- 1987 – Sunbow Productions' serial Visionaries: Knights of the Magical Light: Ectar of the Spectral Knights possessed the totem of the fox.
- 1987 – The Little Troll Prince Towards the climax of the special, a fox chases Bu's Brothers, Borch and Prag, and their friends, Stav and Ribo back up the mountain to the Troll Kingdom.
- 1987 – Sylvanian Families: In the animated series, members of the Slydale Family are Slick, Velvette, Buster, Scarlett, Skitter, and Lindy.
- 1987 – Maple Town: In the animated series, the members of the Fox Family are Fanny, Freddy, Mr. and Mrs. Fox.
- 1990 – Disney's TaleSpin: several fox characters appear in the series, such as Katie Dodd, Myra Foxworthy, Muffy Vanderschmear, and Buffy Vanderschmear.
- 1990–1991 – Kyatto Ninden Teyandee (Samurai Pizza Cats): the main antagonist, Kitsunezuka Ko'on-no-Kami, is a prime minister in Edoropolis. In the Saban English version, he is known as Seymour "The Big" Cheese, and is a rat instead.
- 1991 – Don Bluth's Rock-a-Doodle, based on Chantecler by Edmond Rostand, a tale about a rooster; one of the antagonists of the story is a fat fox named Pinky.
- 1991 – TV series Bucky O'Hare: Vixen Captain Mimi LaFloo; based on 1970s comics.
- 1992/2006 – Operation Lifesaver Video Sly Fox and Birdie teaches kids about railroad safety.
- 1993–1996 – The Animals of Farthing Wood TV series and movie: Fox and his mate Vixen.
- 1993, 1996 and 2007 – Flemming Quist Møller's Danish animated films Jungledyret Hugo: Rita, an urban fox.
- 1993 – Tezuka's Akuemon: Anime based on Japanese folk tale about fox-wife.
- 1993 – Adventures of Sonic the Hedgehog: A TV series based on the characters Sonic the Hedgehog, Miles "Tails" Prower, who is a fox, and Doctor Robotnik.
- 1994 – Pom Poko: Ryutaro, a transforming fox (kitsune), and other transforming foxes.
- 1996, 1997 - Saban's Adventures of Oliver Twist: Fagin, an old fox who is the leader of the fellowship.
- 1997 – Tezuka's In the Beginning: The Bible Stories: Vixy, a vixen narrator.
- 1997-1998 Patrol 03 "Carmen"
- 1999 – Cosgrove Hall's The Foxbusters: Cartoon series based on Dick King Smith's novel about a group of chickens defending their farm against a gang of foxes.
- 1999–2001 – Pablo the Little Red Fox: A BBC series that revolves around the adventures of three child foxes and the misadventures they have.
- 1999–2001 – Nelvana's Redwall series, based on the book.
- 2000–2019 – Nickelodeon's Dora the Explorer – Swiper the Fox, mischievous thief fox.
- 2002 – Balto II: Wolf Quest, sequel to 1995's Balto, featuring a cunning fox fooling Balto while the latter searches for his daughter. The fox was voiced by Mary Kay Bergman, in one of her final voice roles before her death in 1999.
- 2003 – Charlotte's Web 2: Wilbur's Great Adventure, features an evil and villainous red fox called Farley.
- 2003–2006 – Sonic X is a TV series which focused on Sonic the Hedgehog, Miles "Tails" Prower, and their friends being teleported to the real world.
- 2005 – A Thierry Schiel CGI film Le Roman de Renart ("Renart the Fox").
- 2005 – Foxy Loxy from Disney's 2005 film Chicken Little.
- 2006 – The Fox and the Hound 2, followup to the animated film The Fox and the Hound
- 2007 – Lee Sung-gang's South Korean animated film Yobi, the Five Tailed Fox: Yobi, a young kumiho girl.
- 2007 – TV series Skunk Fu!: Fox, on whom Rabbit has a big crush.
- 2009 – Fantastic Mr. Fox, Wes Anderson's stop-motion animation adaptation of Roald Dahl's children's book.
- 2010 – My Girlfriend is a Nine-Tailed Fox is a South Korean romantic comedy where a young girl plays a nine-tailed fox in the form of a human.
- 2010 – Popy from CGI animation series Oscar's Oasis.
- 2011 – Angelique from the CGI film Rango.
- 2011-2017 - Little Redwood Fox from the SLR series Guess How Much I Love You based on Sam McBratney’s book.
- 2015 – Ge Shuiying's CGI film Agent F.O.X.: Agent F.O.X., a super spy fox
- 2015 – Yoyotoki HappyEars from the animated series Yoyotoki HappyEars
- 2016 – Disney's animated film Zootopia (also known as Zootropolis in some countries) features three fox characters: Nick Wilde, one of the main protagonists, as well as Gideon Grey and Finnick, two supporting characters. Wilde and Finnick also appeared in the 2025 sequel Zootopia 2.
- 2016 – Vix from the CGI film Spark: A Space Tail.
- 2016 – Darma from the animated film Rock Dog.
- 2017 – The Big Bad Fox and Other Tales.... The fox takes eggs from a hen, but then becomes a mother figure to the chicks.
- 2018–2020 – 101 Dalmatian Street features the recurring character Fergus Fox.
- 2018–2020 – Unikitty! features Dr. Fox, who is the castle's resident scientist. Her experiments and inventions can both create and resolve problems.
- 2018-2019 - Becca's Bunch - Sylvia
- 2019–2020 – Mao Mao: Heroes of Pure Heart features Rufus, a sly and cunning fox who swindles the Sweetypies of Pure Heart Valley.
- 2019 – Swifty and Jade from the animated film Arctic Dogs.
- 2019 - 2020 - Envie Fernandez - Kingdom Force
- 2020 – "Tale of the Nine Tailed" features a nine-tailed fox who abdicates his position as the guardian mountain spirit of Baekdudaegan to search for the reincarnation of his one true love. Season 2 was released in 2023.
- 2022 – Diane Foxington from The Bad Guys and the 2025 sequel The Bad Guys 2. Foxington also appears as a playable character in the 2023 crossover kart-racing video game DreamWorks All-Star Kart Racing.
- 2022 – The Creature Cases features Kit Casey, a yellow kit fox
- 2023-present - Candle Fox from Kiff
- 2024 – Zhen, a Corsac Fox and the new Dragon Warrior from Kung Fu Panda 4
- 2024-present – The TV series Carl the Collector features Lotta Fox, who is autistic.
- 2025 - Pepe Zorrillo, mascot of the Real Valladolid soccer team, named in clear allusion to José Zorrilla, a poet who is the namesake of the stadium, from Toledo: The Film.

==== Anime ====
- Aggretsuko – Fenneko
- Beastars – Voss, a Fennec Fox
- Blue Exorcist – Mike and Uke
- BNA: Brand New Animal – Nazuna Hiwatashi
- Dragon Ball – Donbe
- Dog Days – Yukikaze Panettone
- Gingitsune – An anime in which protagonist Makoto Saeki meets the fox Gintarou and becomes a heiress bridging gods and humans
- Digimon – Renamon, Kudamon, Kyuubimon, Pokomon, Taomon, Sakuyamon and Youkomon
- Gugure! Kokkuri-san – Kokkuri-san
- Hiiro no Kakera – O-Chan, Yuuichi Komura
- Hyper Police – Sakura Bokuseiinmonzeninari
- Inu x Boku – Soushi Miketsukami
- Inukami! – Yoko and Dai Yoko
- Inuyasha – Shippo
- Jewelpet – Larimar and Gumimin
- Kaiketsu Zorori – Zorori
- Kamisama Kiss – Tomoe
- Kanokon – Chizuru and Tayura Minamoto, and Tamamo-no-Mae
- Kanon – Makoto Sawatari
- Kekkaishi – Hime
- Kemono Friends – The females Ezo Red Fox and Silver Fox appear as a couple in the show.
- Kyatto Ninden Teyandee – Kitsunezuka Ko'on-no-Kami
- Naruto – Naruto Uzumaki, host to the fox-like Tailed Beast Kurama
- Natsume's Book of Friends – Natsume, the main protagonist, meets a young kitsune while on a walk.
- One Piece – Foxy, and Suu the cloud fox
- Pokémon – Vulpix, Ninetales, Zorua, Zoroark, Fennekin, Braixen, Delphox, Nickit and Thievul
- Rise of the Nura Clan – Hagoromo Gitsune
- Rosario + Vampire – Kuyou
- Shaman King – Conchi
- Sherlock Hound – Sherlock
- Slayers – Jillas Jillos Jillas
- Sonic the Hedgehog and Sonic X – Miles "Tails" Prower
- Strike Witches – Eila Ilmatar Juutilainen
- Tactics – Yoko
- Tales of Symphonia – Corrine and Venus
- Tayutama: Kiss on my Deity – Mashiro Mito
- The Helpful Fox Senko-san – Senko-san
- Urusei Yatsura – The little fox, whose name is a "little fox".
- Urara Meirochou – The protagonist love interest, Kon, is possessed frequently by the fox spirit Kokkuri-san.
- Wagaya no Oinari-sama – Kugen Tenko, Gyokuyou Tenko, Ogami and Daigorou
- xxxHolic – Mugetsu
- Yu Yu Hakusho – Kurama
- Zoids – The Shadow Fox

=== Feature film ===
- 1973 – Ukrainian movie director Igor Negrescul's Domino: A Life of a Silver Fox.
- 1990 – Akira Kurosawa's Dreams: A boy goes to the forest to see where the foxes have their weddings.
- 1994 – Russian director Ury Klimov's Once Lives a Fox: Story of a fox escaped from the zoo.
- 2005 – Andrew Adamson's The Chronicles of Narnia: The Lion, the Witch, and the Wardrobe: Mr. Fox, voiced by Rupert Everett, is turned to stone by the White Witch.
- 2006 – Helen the Baby Fox, in which seven-year-old Taichi found a baby fox named "Helen".
- 2007 – The Fox and the Child, directed by Luc Jacquet, is about a young girl who befriends a fox.
- 2009 – Antichrist directed by Lars von Trier has a possibly supernatural fox appearing throughout the film.
- 2021 – The Green Knight: A fox follows Gawain and warns him to abandon his quest.
- 2022 – Der Fuchs: a WW2 German soldier adopts and raises a baby fox.
- 2022 – Sonic the Hedgehog 2: Miles "Tails" Prower, a young fox boy with two tails and the ability of flight, accompanies Sonic the Hedgehog in the sequel to the 2020 film, Sonic the Hedgehog.
- 2024 – Kung Fu Panda 4: Zhen, a female Corsac Fox, who is the New Dragon Warrior.

== Music ==
=== Popular music ===
- 1966 – The Hollies & Peter Sellers' "After the Fox"; popular theme song from the movie of the same name
- 1967 – The Jimi Hendrix Experience's "Foxy Lady"
- 1968 – Manfred Mann "Fox on the Run"
- 1972 – Genesis' Foxtrot
- 1975 – Sweet's "Fox on the Run"
- 1977 - "The cat and the fox" (in italian: Il gatto e la volpe) by Edoardo Bennato - also featured by Disney in Luca
- 1981 – Elton John's 1981 album The Fox, and the title track therefrom.
- 1986 – Kate Bush's titular single release from her 1985 Album Hounds of Love references a fox in the lyrics.
- 1996 – Belle & Sebastian's album If You're Feeling Sinister features a song called The Fox in the Snow.
- 2000 – Nickel Creek's "The Fox" is a variation of a folk song about a fox stealing food for his family.
- 2001 – Millencolin's album Pennybridge Pioneers includes a song simply titled "Fox".
- 2004 – mewithoutYou's sophomore studio album is titled Catch for Us the Foxes. The band's subsequent albums feature the songs "The Fox, the Crow, and the Cookie" (It's All Crazy! It's All False! It's All a Dream! It's Alright, 2009) and "Fox's Dream of the Log Flume" (Ten Stories 2012).
- 2004 – Rilo Kiley's album More Adventurous features a song titled "Portions For Foxes"
- 2005 – Sleater-Kinney's album The Woods features a song called "The Fox".
- 2008 – Rapper Nas recorded the song "Sly Fox" on his untitled 2008 album. In the song he disses Fox News, considering it to be sly and deceitful.
- 2008 – Born Ruffians' song "Foxes Mate For Life" appears on their debut album Red, Yellow & Blue.
- 2008 – Fleet Foxes, a five-piece band from Seattle.
- 2010 – Alexandra Burke's song "Broken Heels" makes mention of being "fast like a fox".
- 2010 – The kawaii metal group Babymetal claims to perform in accordance to revelations from the Fox God and have a recurring fox motif, including their 2013 single "Megitsune".
- 2012 – Louisa Rose Allen or known as her stage name Foxes.
- 2013 – Ylvis's "The Fox (What Does the Fox Say?)"
- 2014 – Taylor Swift's song "I Know Places" from 1989 references foxes.
- 2015 – The music video for The Prodigy's "Nasty".
- 2016 – Baby Shark Dance is a popular kids' song made by the children's education brand Pinkfong. The mascot of the brand, a pink fox, appears in the video.

=== Folk music ===
- "The Fox" – 15th century folk song about the animal that has been adapted and recorded by many performers.
- Mr. Fox – 1970s folk rock band
- June Tabor – Reynard the Fox

== Other media ==
=== Video games ===
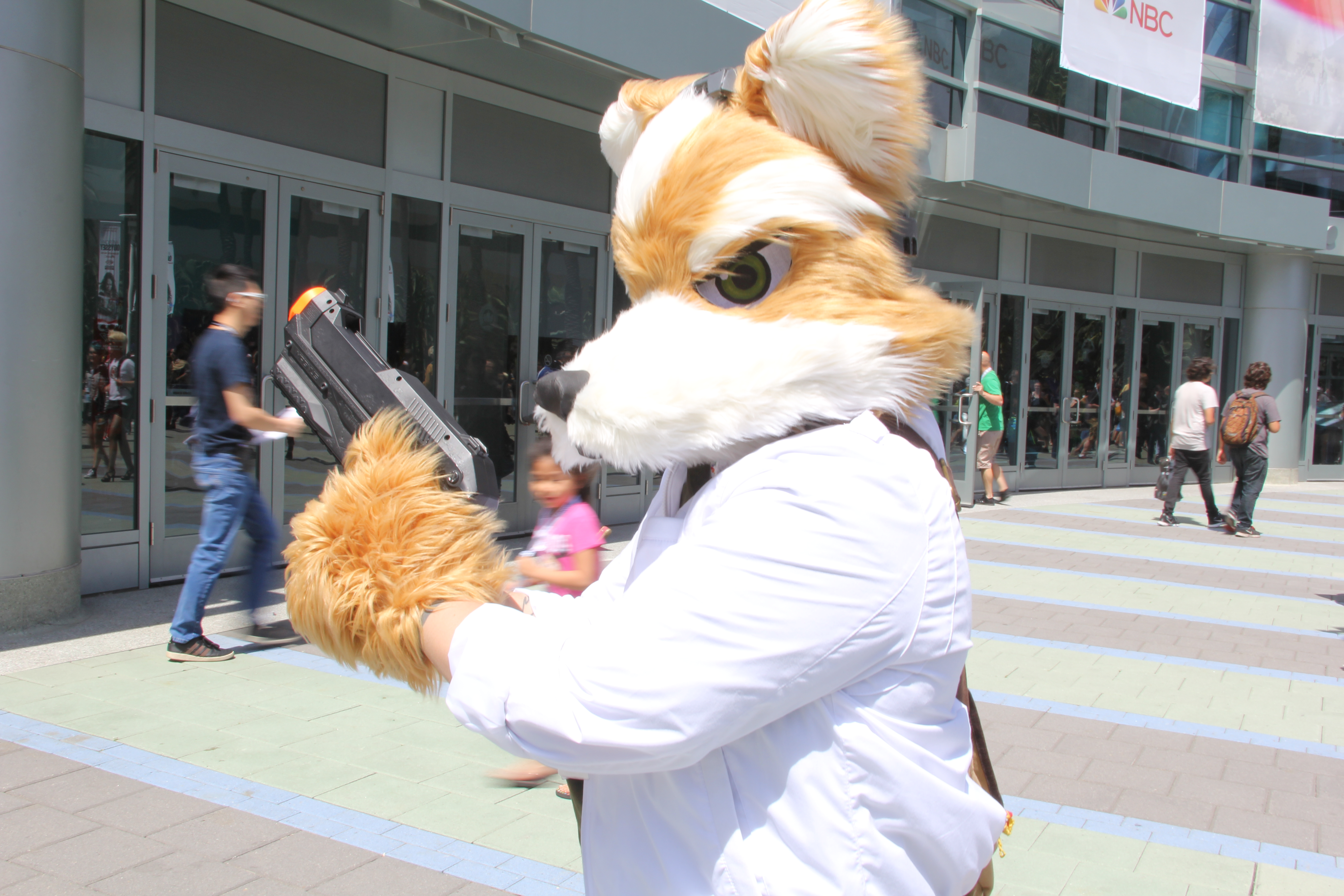
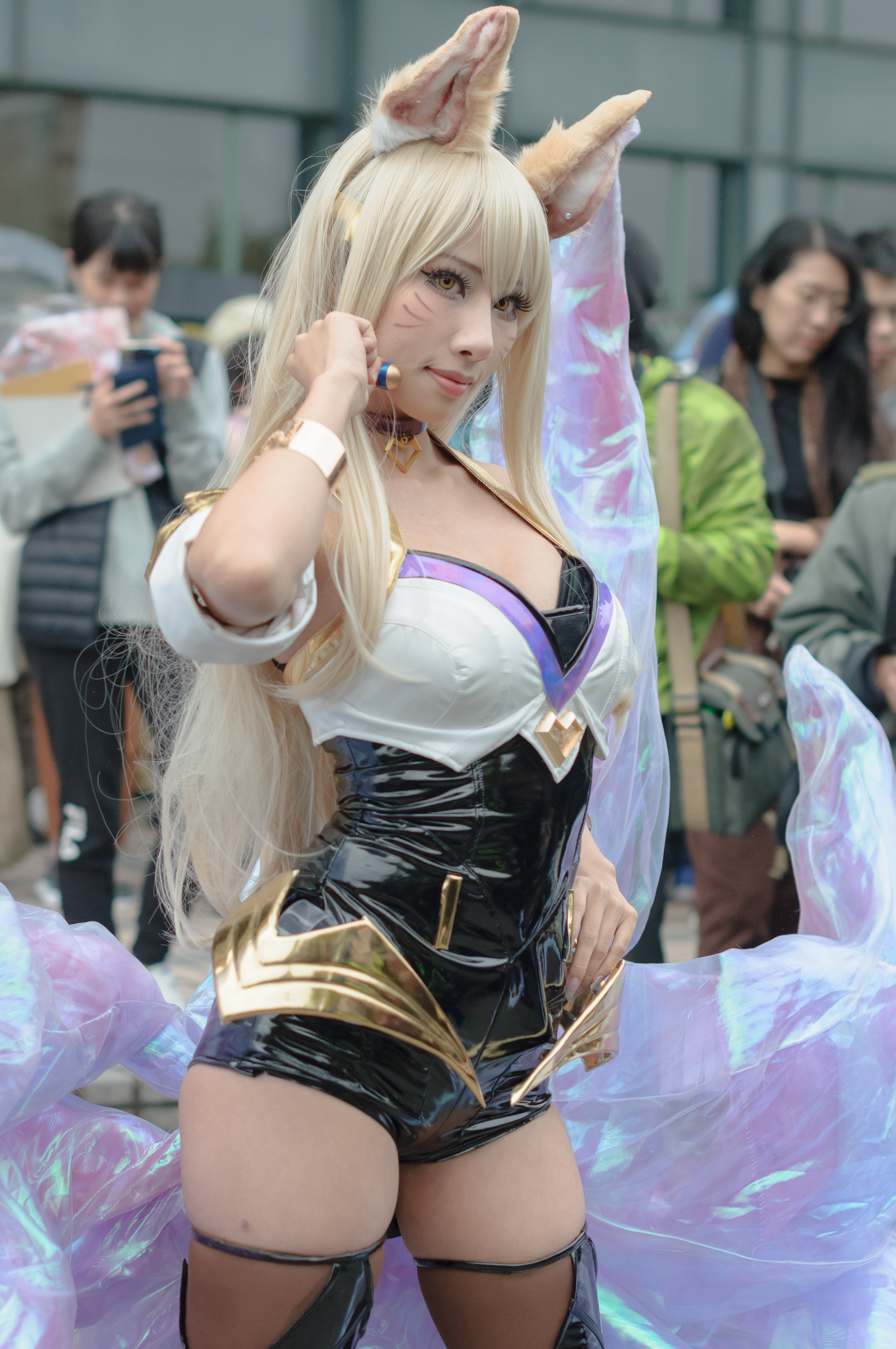
Cosplay of Fox McCloud of Star Fox (top) and Ahri from League of Legends (bottom)
- Miles "Tails" Prower, a two-tailed fox that can spin his tails like a helicopter to fly, and appeared in the Sonic the Hedgehog series beginning with Sonic the Hedgehog 2.
- Fox McCloud, James McCloud, and Krystal from the Nintendo Star Fox series.
- Keaton of the Legend of Zelda series.
- Vulpix, Ninetales, Zorua, Zoroark, Fennekin, Braixen, Delphox, Nickit, and Thievul from the Pokémon series.
- Inspector Carmelita Montoya Fox, a police officer in the Sly Cooper series of video games.
- Rif and Rhene of the Fox Tribe from the video game Inherit the Earth: Quest for the Orb.
- Spy Fox, a James Bond parody computer game series.
- Crazy Redd, the black market salesman from the Animal Crossing games.
- In Trickster Online, Fox is the female sense type character.
- In the video game series Metal Gear Solid, the special forces group is known as "FOXHOUND". Additionally, the title of Grey Fox was given to Frank Jaeger.
- Ninetails, a major boss character from the game Ōkami.
- Titus the Fox: To Marrakech and Back, fox mascot in the 1990s platform game.
- In the video game Drawn To Life for the Nintendo DS, the charters of the village are "Raposas", which is Portuguese for fox.
- Persona 4 features a fox living at a shrine as one of its Social Links.
- Yusuke Kitagawa from Persona 5 adopts the codename Fox after his Inari-like mask.
- Jade Empire, the RPG by BioWare, contains fox spirits as well as a non-playable character who uses the alias Silk Fox.
- Psycho Fox, the main character in a Sega Master System game of the same name.
- The 2009 video game League of Legends includes a kumiho character named Ahri, the Nine-Tailed Fox.
- The horror game Five Nights at Freddy's features the animatronic character Foxy the Pirate.
- In the video game Little Misfortune, the titular character is protected from the demon Morgo by a fox named Benjamin Juhanelius Redfox.
- Pepper and Pip from Paladins.
- The Vulpera are a race of nomadic fox people that inhabit the deserts of Vol'dun on Zandalar in the game World of Warcraft.
- Gregg from Night in the Woods.
- In the sandbox game Terraria, there is a zoologist NPC that was said to be bitten by a fox, and now takes the form of a fox in certain circumstances.
- The First Tree is played from the perspective of an unnamed mother fox.
- Overwatch 2 includes the fox spirit-based character, Kiriko.
- Naraka: Bladepoint features Tessa, a girl who shares her soul with an ancient fox spirit.
- In the endless running game Cookie Run , there is a playable fox character called Kumiho Cookie, which can turn into a Cookie and a fox.
- Both Yae Miko and Tighnari from the game Genshin Impact are based on foxes. Yae Miko is a kitsune and Tighnari has design elements based on the fennec fox. Other noteworthy Hoyoverse fox-based characters include the foxians, a race of people with fox ears and tails from Honkai: Star Rail and Hoshimi Miyabi from Zenless Zone Zero.
- In the MMORPG Elsword, Eun is a nine-tailed fox spirit who is sealed in an orange gem of a hairpin and helps the female character Ara with its power.
- Ran Yakumo, a youkai possessing the body of a nine-tailed fox, and Tsukasa Kudamaki, a kuda-gitsune, from the Touhou Project series.

=== Comics and visual novels ===
- Slylock Fox, in the Sherlock Holmes parody comic strips from Slylock Fox & Comics for Kids
- Raposão/McFox, a character from the Brazilian comic series Lionel's Kingdom.
- Fix and Foxi, a German comic series where the titular characters are two fox brothers.
- In Kiss, in Psycho Circus #14 and #15, the members of Kiss are portrayed as supernatural beings who train a feudal Japanese samurai to outsmart supernatural foxes.
- Ninjara, a character who appeared in the Teenage Mutant Ninja Turtles franchise.
- The main female protagonist in Neil Gaiman's The Sandman: The Dream Hunters illustrated novella and comic is a legendary Kitsune
- The Teenage Mutant Ninja Turtles comic series from IDW Publishing features the character of Alopex, an Arctic fox ninja.

==== Web-comics ====
- Ozy and Millie – foxes starring in a webcomic of the same name
- Kevin and Kell – Fiona Fennec and George Fennec, her father, are both fennec foxes.
- Gunnerkrigg Court – The comic's main character Antimony has a fox companion whose spirit is trapped in a doll of a white wolf, a symbol for Antimony in Alchemy.

=== Card games ===
- In the trading card game Magic: The Gathering, Eight-and-a-Half-Tails is a legendary fox monk of great power and purity.

== Performance arts and opera ==
- 1916, ballet by the Igor Stravinsky Renard
- The Cunning Little Vixen, Leoš Janáček opera

== Other ==
- c.1036 Wild fox koan, an influential kōan story in the Zen tradition
- 1963, 1968, 2002, 2006 Peter Firmin's Basil Brush, British television sock-puppet
- Flora Fox, The Get Along Gang
- Mozilla Firefox's logo is a fox on a globe
- Slushi, a blue fox from the web series Chikn Nuggit
- The inaugural logo for the Smart Price value range brand from British supermarket Asda featured a red fox.
- The Catholic Church used images of foxes dressed as monks or priests preaching to geese in church art as propaganda against the Lollards. These images were based on the story of the preaching fox found in The History of Reynard the Fox and its sequel, The Shifts of Reynardine (the son of Reynard).

=== Heraldry ===
The fox and castle on the coat of arms of Châteaurenard, France

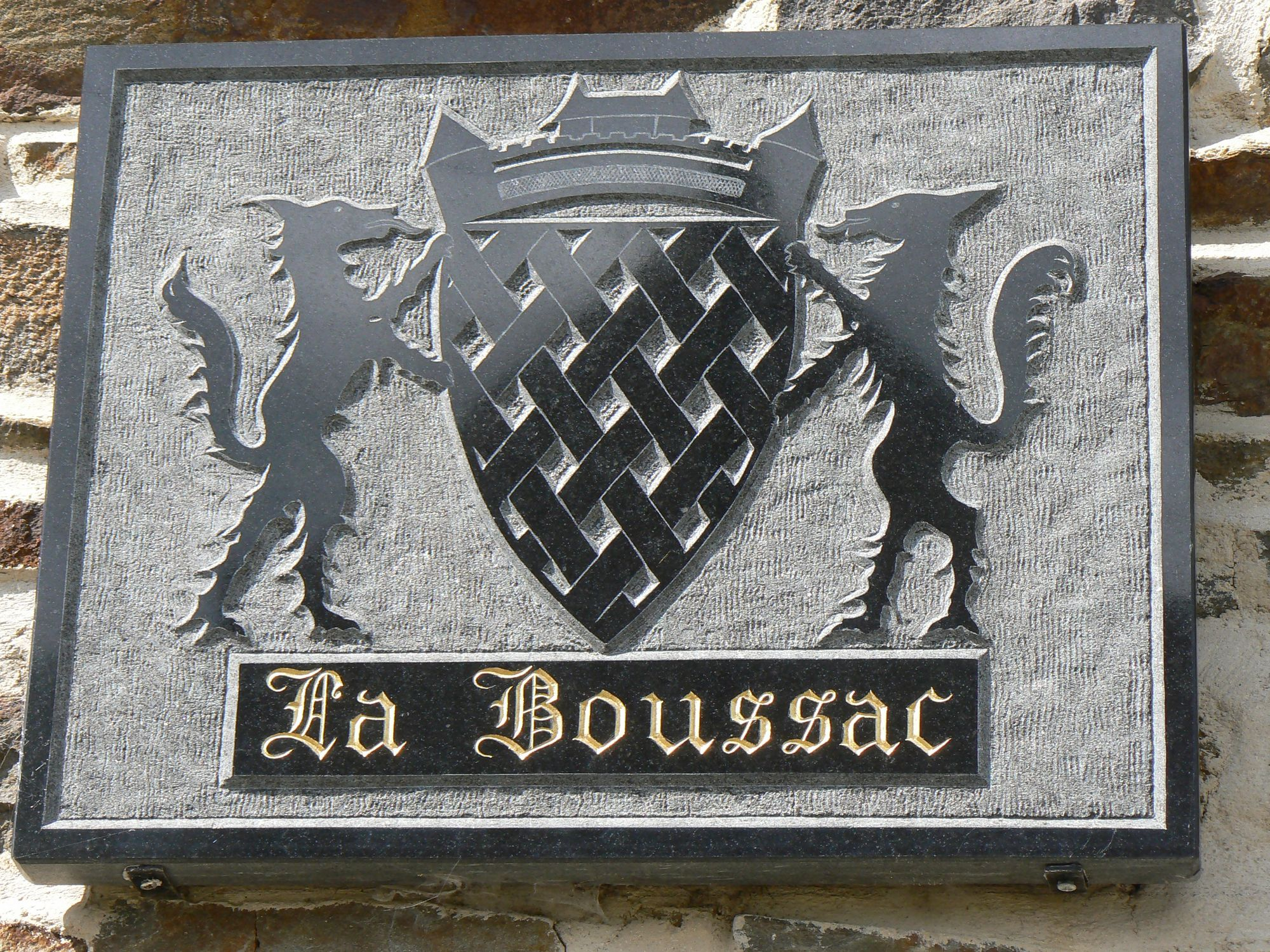
Reynard and vixen supporting the arms of La Boussac, France

- The canting coat of arms of Châteaurenard in France displays a fox, as do the coats of arms of Poligny in France and Tuliszków in Poland.
- The reynard (male fox) as dexter supporter and vixen (female fox) as sinister supporter of the arms of La Boussac in Brittany.

=== Sports ===
- The English association football team Leicester City are nicknamed 'the Foxes'.
- One of the nicknames for Brazilian football team Cruzeiro is 'Raposa', meaning Fox in Portuguese.
- The athletic teams of Marist College in Poughkeepsie, New York are known as the Red Foxes.

=== Ships ===
Sixteen ships and two shore establishments of the Royal Navy have been named HMS Fox, after the animal. Other vessels of navies and civilian ships bore such a name.
