= Osan Kitsune =

Japanese fox folktale

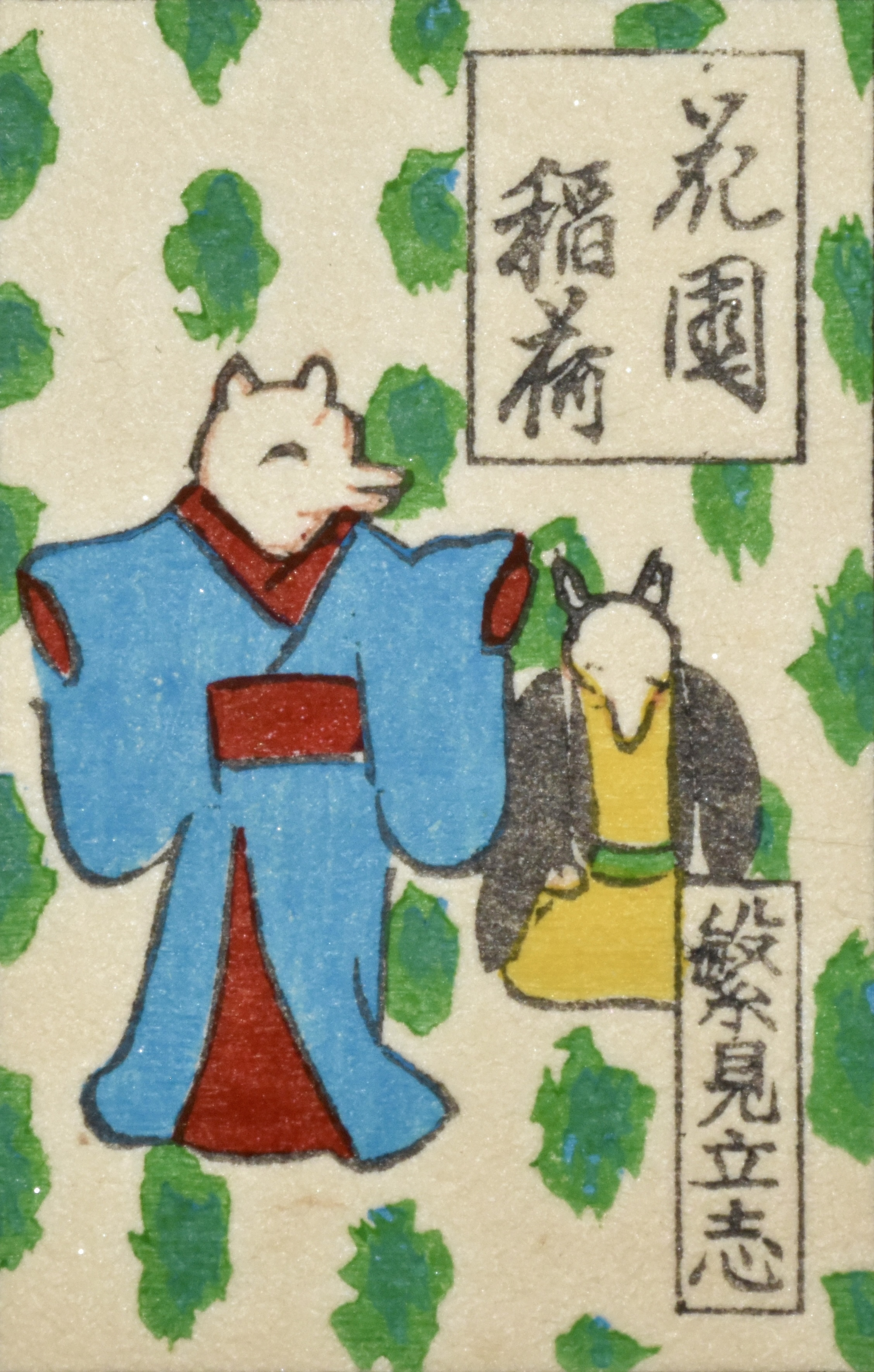
Kitsune depicted in artwork.

Osan Kitsune (Japanese: おさん狐, おさんぎつね, romanized: Osan Fox) is a folktale from Hiroshima Prefecture, Japan. It describes a fox spirit associated with deceptive encounters, often appearing in human form.

The story is included in published collections of Hiroshima folktales.

== Folklore ==
In the tale, the fox spirit appears as a woman carrying an infant and asks passersby for help. After handing over the child, the figure disappears; the child is later revealed to be a stone.

== Associated locations ==
Several locations in the Eba area of Hiroshima are associated with the Osan kitsune legend. A road known as Osan-dōri (おさん通り) is named after the figure.

The road forms part of the Yokogawa–Eba municipal route, extending from the area near Eba Station to the vicinity of the Eba Tunnel.

A statue of the Osan fox is located near the Eba streetcar stop.

The legend is also associated with the area around Satsuyama Park in Eba.

== See also ==
- Kitsune
- Hiroshima prefecture
- Fox spirits
