= Ice and the Sky =

2015 film

- Film poster
- Directed by: Luc Jacquet
- Written by: Luc Jacquet
- Produced by: Richard Grandpierre
- Starring: Claude Lorius
- Cinematography: Stéphane Martin
- Edited by: Stéphane Mazalaigue
- Music by: Cyrille Aufort
- Distributed by: Pathé Distribution
- Release dates: 24 May 2015 (Cannes); 21 October 2015 (France)
- Country: France
- Language: French

Ice and the Sky (French: La Glace et le ciel, also known as Antarctica: Ice and Sky) is a 2015 French documentary film directed by Luc Jacquet about the work of Claude Lorius, who began studying Antarctic ice in 1957, and, in 1965, was the first scientist to be concerned about global warming. The film was selected to close the 2015 Cannes Film Festival.
