= Luc Jacquet =

French film director and screenwriter (born 1967)

- Born: 5 December 1967 (age 58); Bourg-en-Bresse, France
- Occupations: Film director, screenwriter, cinematographer
- Years active: 1993–present
- Notable work: March of the Penguins
- Website: https://www.icebreaker-studios.com/en

Luc Jacquet (French pronunciation: [lyk ʒakɛ]; born 5 December 1967) is a French film director and screenwriter. He wrote and directed the film March of the Penguins, which won an Oscar for Best Documentary Feature in 2006 and received a nomination for the Writers Guild of America Award for Best Documentary Screenplay. He also directed The Fox and the Child. It was released in Britain and Ireland in slightly re-edited dubbed English-language version with narration by Kate Winslet, and was released in the United States on 29 February 2008.

His 2015 film Ice and the Sky was selected to close the 2015 Cannes Film Festival.

== Biography ==
Born in Bourg-en-Bresse, Luc Jacquet spent his youth in the Jura region of Ain. It is in this environment that his passion for nature gradually developed:

I started creating my own world, looking up, taking pleasure in watching and listening to the singing of birds

It was also in this setting that he got used to the cold and snow. A trained ecologist, he studied at the Lyon I University, where he earned a Master's degree in animal biology in 1991 (more specifically in organism and population biology), then at the University of Grenoble, where he obtained a DEA in management of mountain natural environments in 1993. He then aimed for a career as a researcher in animal behavior. He completed numerous field internships, working notably on aquatic ecology, ornithology, and a population of marmots in the Vanoise Massif. He already describes himself as a

jack-of-all-trades and vagabond

According to him, his scientific studies also helped him acquire a certain rigor necessary for his career as a filmmaker.

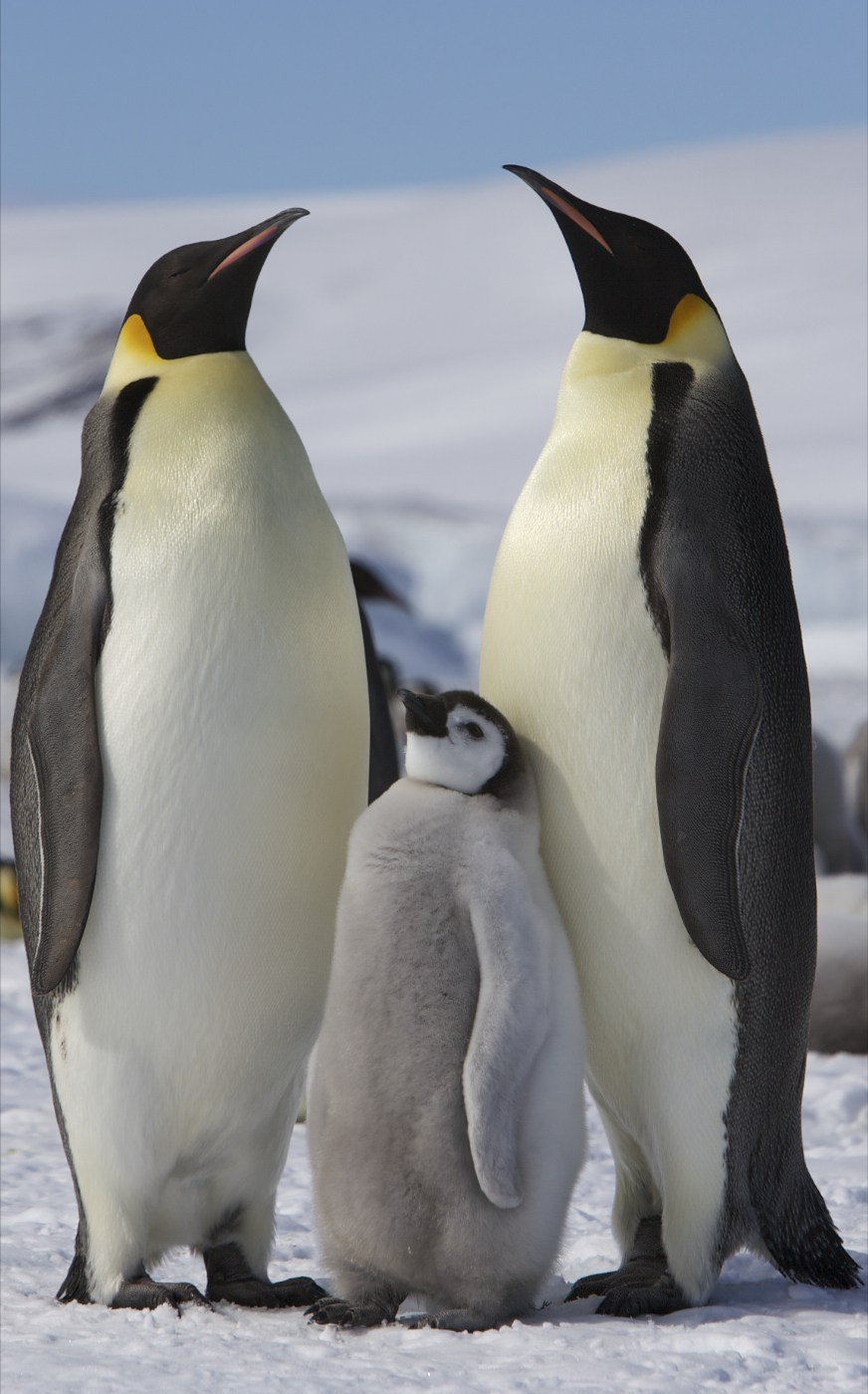
Emperor penguins are prominent characters in several films in which Luc Jacquet participated as director or director of photography, including La Marche de l'empereur, which brought him international success and an Oscar.

It was during his studies in Lyon that, in 1992, he responded to an ad looking for someone to go to Antarctica to study emperor penguins:

biologist looking for someone fearless, ready to spend fourteen months at the end of the world

These were his first contacts with this continent and these animals. It was also an opportunity to train on 35mm film when he had never used a camera before. During this ornithological mission for the CNRS, he was entrusted with the role of cameraman alongside Swiss director Hans-Ulrich Schlumpf for the documentary The Penguin March. This experience was decisive: Luc Jacquet decided to dedicate himself to documentary films, realizing that he was more interested in this than in research.

He then worked on several documentaries, mainly wildlife films, often in Antarctica or the sub-Antarctic islands, as a cinematographer. He later produced his own documentaries, including The Leopard Seal: The Ogre's Share in 1999 and March of the Penguins in 2004, both awarded at various festivals. In the early 2000s, he began developing his feature film project, which became reality with the release of March of the Penguins in 2005. The film achieved worldwide success and received numerous awards, notably the Oscar for Best Documentary, awarded on 5 March 2006, at the 78th Academy Awards in Hollywood.

In 2007 he released his second feature film, The Fox and the Child, a fiction largely shot on the plateau de Retord, in the natural and historic region of Bugey, in Ain. The story is partly based on a childhood memory of Luc Jacquet: his encounter with a fox.

In 2010 he founded the association Wild-Touch, with the aim of giving a concrete purpose to his international fame. Within Wild-Touch, he began, in August 2010, alongside botanist Francis Hallé, shooting his new project, Il était une forêt (initially titled C'était la forêt des pluies), a documentary about primary forests. Simultaneously, since 2008, he has been working on a 3D fictional scenario about prehistoric art, provisionally titled The Mural, a project that the production company Bonne Pioche announced as in development until 2012 before withdrawing it from its project list.

In 2011 he also engaged in creating Lumières Numériques, a company dedicated to film restoration and post-production. Based in Villeurbanne. Also in 2011, he served as president of the jury for the 8th International Festival of Oceanian Documentary Film. In 2012, he curated the exhibition Animal for the Alice Mogabgab Gallery in Beirut. In April 2013, he participated in a debate at the University of the Earth at the UNESCO headquarters on the theme

Artists: explorers of the world of tomorrow

His third feature film, Once Upon a Forest, in collaboration with botanist Francis Hallé, was released on 13 November 2013, in theaters, and was nominated for the César Award for Best Documentary in 2014. Luc Jacquet then presided over the jury of the 2014 edition of the Val-d'Isère International Adventure and Discovery Film Festival. That same year, he directed a short film, The Race for Life, to promote childhood vaccination, as part of The Art of Saving a Life, a project led by the Bill & Melinda Gates Foundation.

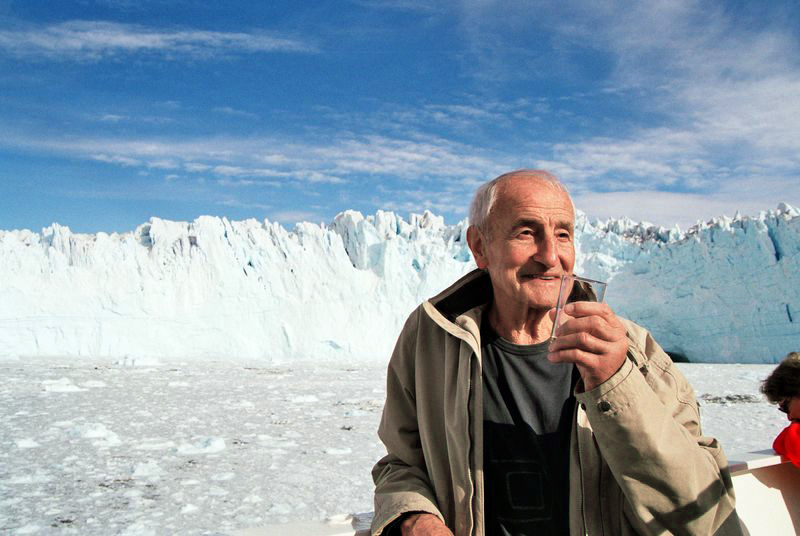
Climate scientist Claude Lorius (here in 2008), subject of his fourth feature film, La Glace et le Ciel.

In March 2015, the Environmental Film Festival in the Nation's Capital organized a retrospective of his films; Luc Jacquet presented his three first feature films as well as early footage from his then-in-production fourth film. This new documentary, La Glace et le Ciel, recounts the life and work of climate scientist Claude Lorius. It was first shown as the closing film at the Cannes Film Festival 2015 and was released later that year on 21 October.

Once Upon a Forest and La Glace et le Ciel are part of meta-projects within his Wild-Touch organization, in a démarche of

mediation of cinema, science, and education

with the development of educational projects on the relevant themes. Jacquet considers that,

by putting the means of cinema at the service of education

he is doing

almost activist cinema

He feels compelled to address environmental issues and the future of the planet in his films:

In other times, I would have made different films. But I make cinema with passion, political cinema, cinema that has no choice.

He also created, notably with photographers Vincent Munier and Laurent Ballesta, the exhibition Antarctica, which was displayed at the Musée des Confluences in Lyon from 26 April 2016 to 16 April 2017 In February 2017, he released a new film about penguins, The Emperor, sometimes described as a sequel to La Marche de l'empereur.

In an open letter to Jean-Yves Le Drian, French Foreign Minister, he called in October 2018 for the creation of a marine sanctuary in Antarctica.

At the end of 2018 he collaborated with luxury brand Loro Piana and directed Cashmere: the Origin of a Secret, a short documentary about cashmere published in October 2019. This work is the first chapter of a trilogy dedicated to the know-how and policies of the Italian house.

In 2020 Luc Jacquet created his production company Icebreaker, based in Monaco. This production company aims to produce and finance artistic projects that raise awareness about environmental issues. The projects of Icebreaker revolve around four themes: the Galápagos Islands, Siberia, the Lascaux Cave and coral.

== Awards ==
Unless otherwise noted or additional, the data in this section comes from the IMDb site for March of the Penguins, The Fox and the Child, and Once Upon a Forest and the official Luc Jacquet website for the other films. Besides, the following list of awards only includes those directly related to Luc Jacquet or the films he directed as a whole. Other awards for other individuals are mentioned on each film's article.

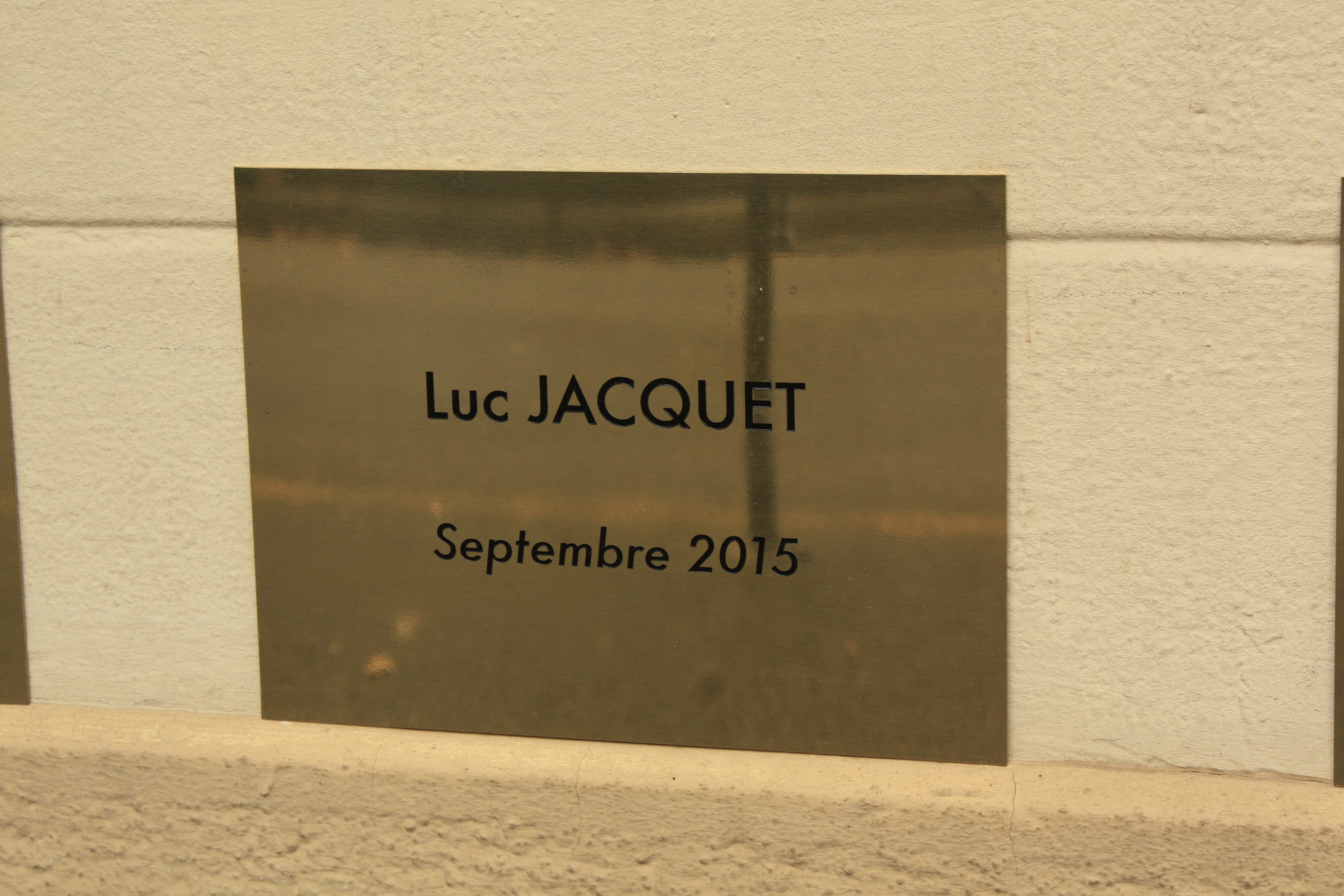
Plaque honoring Luc Jacquet on the "Wall of Filmmakers" at the Institut Lumière.

- September 2015: Honorary plaque on the "Wall of Filmmakers" at the Institut Lumière in Lyon
- For The Weddell Seal Spring:
  - International Festival of Maritime and Exploration Films in Toulon 1996: Bronze Anchor
  - International Mountain and Adventure Film Festival in Autrans 1996: Jury's Favorite Award
- For The Leopard Seal: The Ogre's Share:
  - Antibes Underwater Image Festival 1999: Silver Palme
  - Missoula Wildlife Film Festival 2000: Award for Excellence in Underwater Cinematography
  - Ekofilm Festival in Prague 2000: Best Director Award
- For A Beach and Too Many Penguins:
  - Ménigoute International Ornithological Film Festival 2001: Award (details unknown)
- For The Tick and the Bird:
  - Ménigoute International Ornithological Film Festival 2002: Nature and Discoveries Award
  - Brussels Valvert Festival 2002: Best Commentary Award
  - Bird and Nature Festival in Abbeville 2002: Côte Picarde Award
- For March of the Penguins:
  - National Board of Review 2005: Best Documentary
  - Las Vegas Critics Society Sierra Awards 2005: Best Documentary
  - Phoenix Film Critics Society 2005: Best Documentary
  - Southeastern Film Critics Association 2005: Best Documentary
  - Jackson Wildlife Film Festival 2005: Best Long Documentary
  - Maui Film Festival 2005: Best Documentary
  - 78th Academy Awards 2006: Academy Award for Best Documentary Feature
  - Trophée du Film français 2006: First Film Trophy
  - Young Artist Awards 2006: Jack Coogan Award for Best Family Feature – Long Form
  - Critics' Choice Movie Award for Best Documentary by the Broadcast Film Critics Association 2006
  - Festival du film scientifique de La Réunion 2006: Jury Special Award
  - Wildscreen Festival 2006 (UK): Panda-in-the-Pocket Award
  - Pyongyang International Film Festival 2006: Award (details unknown)
  - CAMIE Award 2006
- For Once Upon a Forest:
  - César Award for Best Documentary 2014
- For La Glace et le Ciel:
  - Cannes Film Festival 2015: Closing film, official selection out of competition
- Nominations and selections*:
  - Antarctic Spring Express: Official selection at the Graz International Film Festival 2007
  - March of the Penguins: Sundance Film Festival 2005 (Special Screenings section)
  - Sundance 2005: Nominated for Best Documentary
  - César Awards 2006: Best First Feature
  - European Film Award 2006: Best Film
  - David di Donatello Awards 2006: Best European Film
  - Trophées Jeunes Talents 2006: Young Director Award
  - Writers Guild of America 2006: Best Documentary Screenplay
  - Chicago Film Critics Association 2006: Best Documentary
  - Online Film Critics Society 2006: Best Documentary
  - The Fox and the Child: Young Artist Awards 2008: Best International Feature
  - Once Upon a Forest: César Award for Best Documentary 2014
  - La Glace et le Ciel: Cannes Film Festival 2015: Official selection, closing film
  - Voyage au pôle Sud: Official selection at the Locarno International Film Festival 2023

== Filmography ==
- Une plage et trop de manchots (2001) TV featurette
- Sous le signe du serpent (2004) TV featurette
- Des manchots et des hommes (2004) featurette Directed with Jérôme Maison
- March of the Penguins (2005)
- The Fox and the Child (2007)
- Il était une forêt (2013)
- Ice and the Sky (2015)
