= The First Tree =

2017 video game

- Developer(s): David Wehle
- Publisher(s): David Wehle
- Designer(s): David Wehle
- Platform(s): Mac; Windows; Linux; Nintendo Switch; PlayStation 4; Xbox One; Android; iOS
- Release: Mac, Windows; September 14, 2017; Linux; October 16, 2017; Switch, PS4, Xbox One; November 30, 2018; Android, iOS; November 18, 2020
- Genre(s): Adventure
- Mode(s): Single-player

The First Tree is a 2017 third-person exploration adventure game developed and published by David Wehle. The game follows a mother fox as she searches for her lost cubs, while the voices of a human couple are overlaid over the fox's journey. The game's visuals and story received both praise and criticism from video game reviewers, while its atmosphere and controls were generally considered calming and clunky, respectively.

== Plot ==
The First Tree's narrative is told "through voice overs and environmental storytelling." The game simultaneously tells two stories: it depicts a fox searching for her lost kits visually. Meanwhile, a conversation between the human couple Joseph and Rachel is overlaid. Joseph relays to Rachel his desire to have connected with his father more meaningfully. Toward the end of the game, the perspective switches to Joseph's first-person point of view.

== Gameplay ==
A third-person "exploration" game, The First Tree has players taking control of a fox. Joe Donnelly of PC Gamer referred to the game as a "walking" and "bounding" simulator, as players follow the fox as she gallops through a natural landscape. There are also some puzzle and platforming elements to the game.

== Development and release ==
The game was largely produced by Utah-based developer David Wehle. Wehle previously developed and released Home is Where One Stars in 2015, though it did not garner much attention or profit. However, it did result in Wehle being hired as a technical artist for the VR experience developer The VOID. In his spare time, he developed and marketed The First Tree. Wehle, was inspired by Journey, Gone Home, and Firewatch, as well as the novel The Road. Wehle had no coding knowledge entering the development of The First Tree. He intended for players to complete the game in 1–2 hours.

A deeply personal game for Wehle, the death of his father inspired him to make the game, as did the birth of his own son. He also provided the voice for Joseph. A fox was chosen for the game "mostly [for] the visual impact of a beautiful red-orange creature in front of a green forest," though Wehle also noted some personal connections to his wife's family name and fox-themed cake toppers she crafted for their wedding.

In regards to the game's visual design, The First Tree "uses a very simple, almost papercraft-inspired design for foliage and even pentagonal lens flares that give everything a very surreal aesthetic." The game was released in the English-language only, but a "fan translation system" was included, allowing players to work on additional translations. The game underwent the Steam Greenlight process.

The first trailer for the game was released in July 2016. The game was released on September 14, 2017, for Windows and Mac. On November 30, 2018, the game received a console release on Nintendo Switch, PlayStation 4 and Xbox One. The game was also released onto iOS on November 18, 2020.

== Reception ==
Reception

Aggregate score
Aggregator	Score
Metacritic	81/100 (PS4); 67/100 (XBO)

Review scores
Publication	Score
IGN	8.4/10
Nintendo World Report	6.5/10
Pocket Gamer	4.5/5

Reception on the game was mixed in regards to its story and visuals, though reviewers were generally critical of the game's controls which were noted to be "clunky" or "stiff".

PC Gamer's Donnelly wrote that "Against the deluge of time-consuming, mentally-demanding games floating around at the moment, The First Tree is a nice change of pace." Corey Plante of Inverse wrote that Wehle's voice acting has an "earnestness [that] comes through in the gameplay," calling his voice "mellow and contemplative, conveying a sense of gravity and personal depth." Rebecca Stow of Push Square gave the game's PS4 version an 8/10 rating, praising its voice acting and writing that "The First Tree effortlessly intertwines fluid gameplay, silky visuals, and two heart-breaking stories." Stow noted the game's limited controls and gameplay, but added that "the beautiful graphics have a calming, profound style and this is the game's focus rather than action-packed gameplay." Reviewing a Japanese translation of the game, Yoshiki Chiba of IGN gave the game an 8.4/10, complimenting its atmosphere and music. Writing for Kotaku, Heather Alexandra largely praised the game. They wrote that "the massive forest landscape is full of frosted peaks and reflected sunlight. The game also has a wonderful grasp of color." Alexandra added, "as I played The First Tree, I fell into a pensive trance. I think it made me feel sad, but it's hard to say. What I do know is that I felt a genuine longing for… something: for the quiet of those forests, for the clarity of mind that the narrator seemed to have."

Conversely, Kotaku's Chloe Spencer was heavily critical of the game. Spencer wrote that "what could be a powerful story-driven narrative is marred by unnecessarily complicated platforming, ill-fitting dialogue, and jarring pacing." Spencer also noticed the sad nature of both story lines in the game, adding that "the game turns into one brutal moment after another, conveying not that pain is a part of life, but that life sucks, everything is pointless, and then you die. The First Tree lacks a balanced look at the realities of life, seeming to be more of a depressing, slow slog rather an in-depth look at loss." John Walker of Rock Paper Shotgun also panned the game, criticizing its "generic landscapes", the writing and characterization of its human characters, and the game's controls. Walker wrote that the game is "like an exercise in narcissism and emotional manipulation," and described it as "grimly dishonest in how it attempts to force pathos in the player as this moany man moans while showing you pictures of dead cute baby animals."

Catherine Dellosa of Pocket Gamer gave the game's iOS version a 4.5/5 star review. Dellosa praised the game's voice acting, soundtrack, and visual sense of wonder, writing that the game is "relaxing physically" and invites players to self-reflect personally. Dellosa did note the game is graphically "clunky" at times.

== See also ==
- Foxes in popular culture, films and literature
