= Francis Hallé =

French botanist and biologist (1938–2025)

Francis Halle
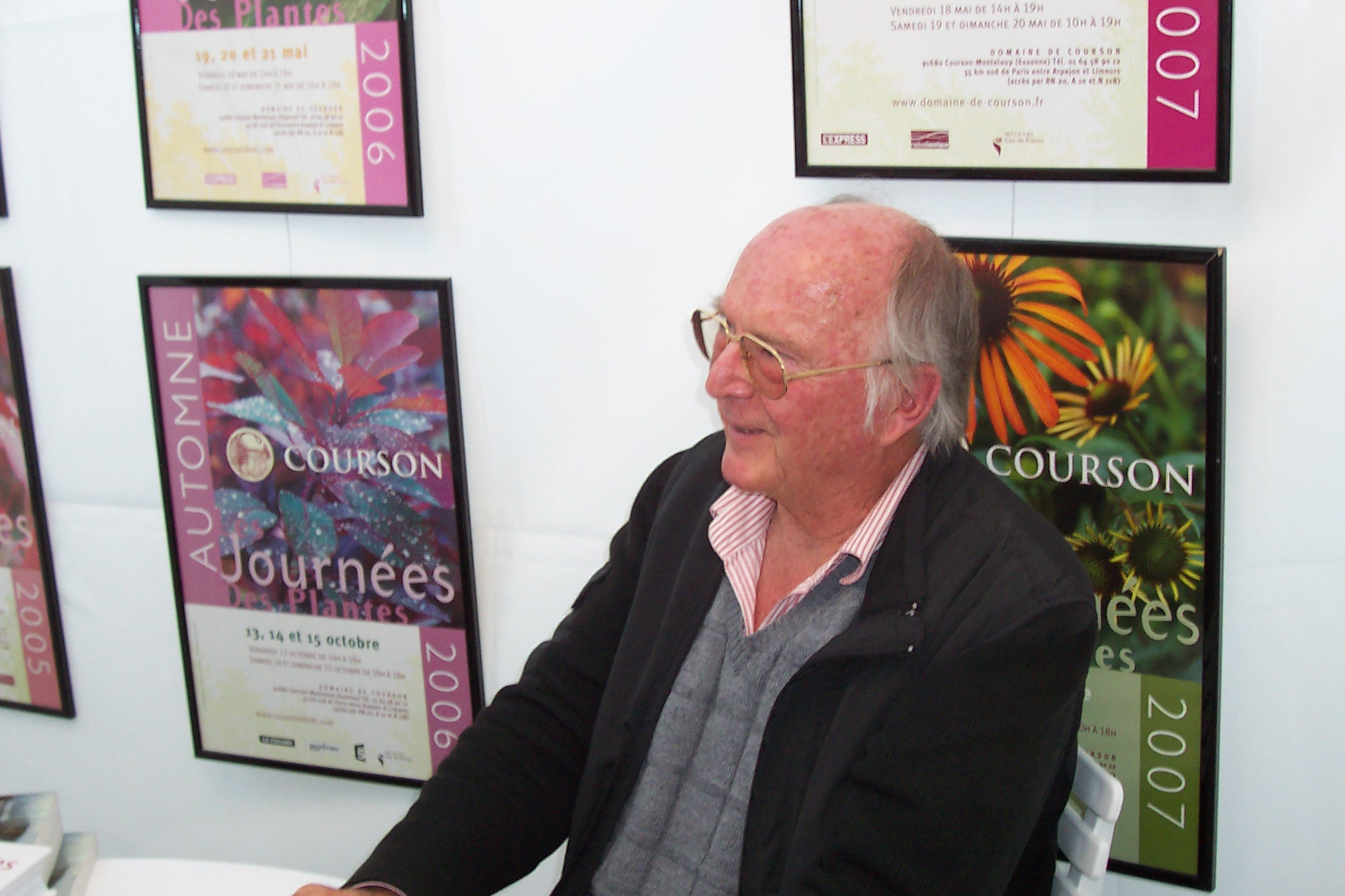
- Employer: University of Montpellier
- Organization: Tropical Botany Association
- Website: https://www.foretprimaire-francishalle.org/english/

Francis Hallé (French pronunciation: [fʁɑ̃sis ale]; 15 April 1938 – 31 December 2025) was a French botanist, biologist, illustrator, and academic professor.

He was a Professor Emeritus at the University of Montpellier, and a specialist on tropical rainforests - extensively describing what he described as "tree architecture," a body of work illustrating and describing plant morphology. Hallé conducted extensive field work across Africa, Asia, America, and Oceana. He is perhaps best known for his observations on the "Radeau des cimes" ("Raft of the peaks"), where alongside a balloon pilot and an architect he made observation-based illustrations on the ecosystem and structure of the tree canopy in an aerostatic balloon. This method allowed him to observe tropical microclimates by non-invasive means.

In 2010, he and Luc Jacquet started to collaborate for a Wild-Touch film project, La Forêt des pluies, a documentary about primary forests.

Hallé died in 2025, at the age of 87.

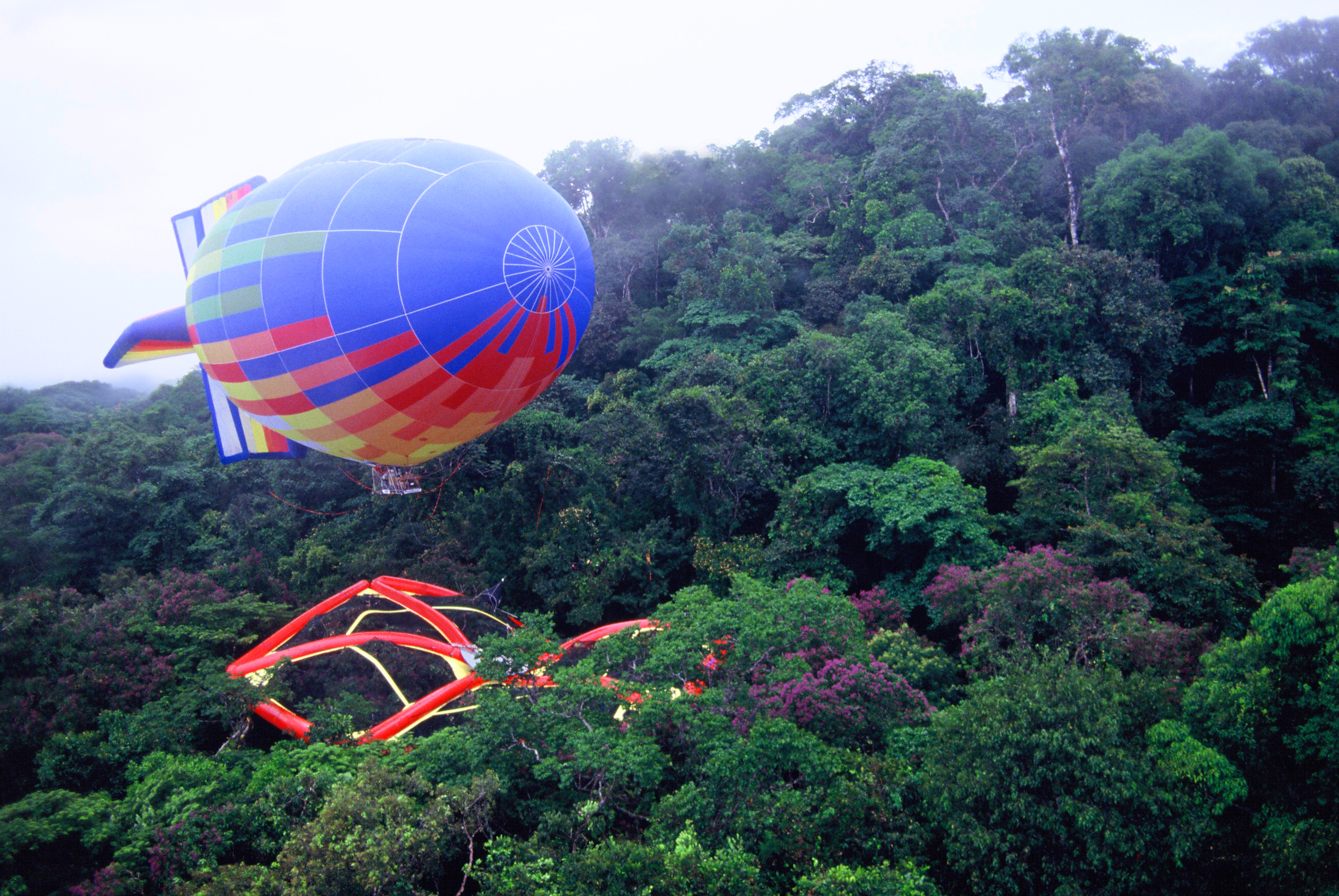
The Raft of The Peaks (Radeau des Cimes) on an excursion in Guyane.

== Bibliography ==
- Tropical Trees and Forests, An Architectural Analysis, 1978
- In Praise of Plants, 2002
- A World Without Winter: The Tropics, Nature and Societies, 2014
- Atlas of Poetic Botany, 2018
