= Wild-Touch =

French non-profit organization

Wild-Touch is a French non-profit organization created in 2010 by Luc Jacquet. This organization wants to develop and support projects that could mediatize environmental problems, especially with the production of films.

One of the main projects (and the first project of Wild-Touch) is the production of Once upon a forest (Il était une forêt), a documentary about the risk of disappearance of primary forests in the world. Started in August 2010, this film is made by Luc Jacquet and botanist Francis Hallé, with the support of actress Marion Cotillard.

== History ==
After winning the Academy Award in 2006 for best documentary with his movie March of the Penguins, Luc Jacquet wants his new reputation to become useful. In April 2010, he therefore creates the organization Wild-Touch, with his wife and friends, in order to help people speak about endangered animals or environmental problems. A few days after the creation of Wild-Touch, Jacquet meets famous French botanist Francis Hallé who has spent 20 years trying to produce a movie about primary forests. Jacquet immediately decides to help him and they both travel to French Guiana in August 2010 where they shoot the first images of their project La Forêt des pluies. According to Jacquet, this film is "a moral and artistic duty" because "our relationship to the world has to change if we want to survive". French actress Marion Cotillard, who's already supported various environmental organizations, has decided to patron this film project. A prologue of the film has already been shown as a short documentary, under the title C'était la forêt des pluies, which was the opening film of the International Festival of Ecological Films of Bourges in October 2011.
