= The Girl from the Chartreuse =

2002 French novel

- Directed by: Jean-Pierre Denis
- Written by: Pierre Péju (novel); Jean-Pierre Denis (screenplay); Yvon Rouvé (screenplay)
- Starring: Olivier Gourmet; Marie-Josée Croze; Yves Jacques; Bertille Noël-Bruneau
- Music by: Michel Portal
- Release date: 2005
- Country: France
- Language: French

The Girl from the Chartreuse (original title: La Petite Chartreuse) is a French novel written by Pierre Péju and published for the first time in France in 2002. It has been translated in several other languages including English and it has been adapted in an eponymous film by Jean-Pierre Denis.

== The film ==
The adapted film was shot in 2004, in the French Alps around Grenoble, and released in France and Belgium in 2005. It stars Olivier Gourmet, Marie-Josée Croze, Yves Jacques and young newcomer Bertille Noël-Bruneau. The scenario was co-written by director Jean-Pierre Denis with Yvon Rouvé. The original soundtrack was composed by Michel Portal.
