= Bertille Noël-Bruneau =

French actress

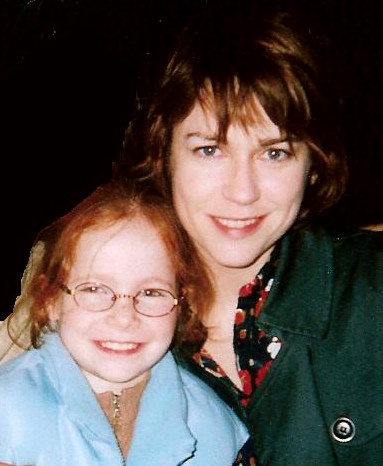
- Bertille Noël-Bruneau (left) with Marie-Josée Croze (2004)
- Born: February 26, 1996 (age 30)
- Occupation: actress
- Notable work: starring as the child in the French film The Fox and the Child (Le Renard et l'enfant)
- Awards: nominated for Young Artist Award (2008)

Bertille Noël-Bruneau (born February 26, 1996) is a French actress, best known for her starring role as the child in the French film The Fox and the Child.

== Filmography ==
- 2005: The Girl from the Chartreuse (La Petite Chartreuse): Eva Blanchot
- 2007: The Fox and the Child (Le Renard et l'enfant): the child

== Documentary ==
- 2005: Au coeur de 'La petite Chartreuse': herself

== Nominations ==
Nomination for the Young Artist Award 2008 for the category “Best Performance in an International Feature Film - Leading Young Performer” for The Fox and The Child (2007)
