= Pierre Péju =

French philosopher, novelist and essayist

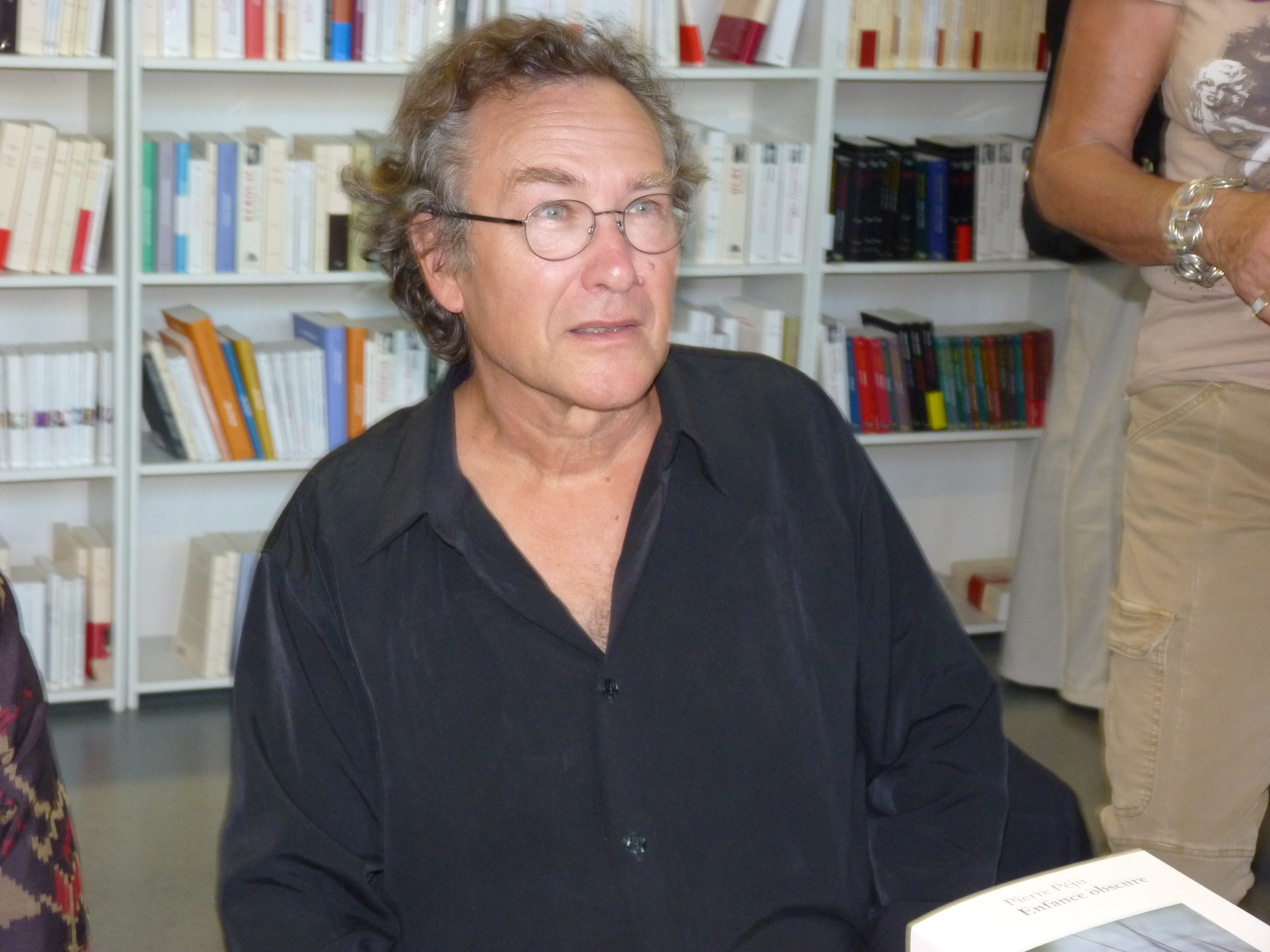
Pierre Péju at the 2011 Mouans-Sartoux Literature Festival

Pierre Péju (born 1946) is a French philosopher, novelist and essayist. Born in Lyon, he studied at the Sorbonne. He has published a number of works in different literary genres, the best-known of which are two prize-winning novels Le rire de l’ogre and La petite Chartreuse. Both titles are studied in French schools and lycees, and both have been translated into English, the former by Euan Cameron and the latter (The Girl from the Chartreuse) by Ina Rilke.
