= The Fox and the Child =

- Film poster
- Directed by: Luc Jacquet
- Written by: Luc Jacquet; Eric Rognard
- Produced by: Yves Darondeau; Christophe Lioud; Emmanuel Priou
- Starring: Bertille Noël-Bruneau; Isabelle Carré
- Cinematography: Eric Dumage; Gérard Simon
- Edited by: Sabine Emiliani
- Music by: Evgueni Galperine; Alice Lewis; David Reyes
- Production companies: Bonne Pioche; Canal+ France 3 Cinéma; Wild Bunch
- Distributed by: Buena Vista International
- Release date: 27 November 2007
- Running time: 93 minutes
- Country: France
- Language: French
- Box office: €20.1 million

The Fox and the Child (French: Le renard et l'enfant) is a 2007 French adventure drama film directed by Luc Jacquet. Starring Bertille Noël-Bruneau, Isabelle Carré and Thomas Laliberté. The English version of the film is narrated by Kate Winslet. It tells the story of a young girl who explores through a forest looking for a fox.

== Plot ==
A young girl who's about 10 years old lives in a farm house in the Jura Mountains in eastern France. One day in autumn, when she rides her bicycle to school through the forest, she observes a fox hunting. Of course, the fox escapes, but the girl yearns to meet the animal again.

During the following months, the girl spends most of her free time in the forest trying to find the fox, but she doesn't meet it again until winter arrives. During the winter, she follows the fox's tracks far across the fields. Suddenly she compares her hand to the size of the tracks near those she is following and discovers they are relatively fresh wolf tracks. She is alarmed as a wolf pack begins howling near her. She runs away panicked, falls and hurts her ankle.

The ankle heals very slowly, so that she has to stay at home during the winter reading a book about foxes and other animals of the forest.

When spring arrives, the girl is looking for foxholes and waits for the fox, who she eventually names Lily. The fox has young babies and moves from one foxhole to another because of the girl's inquisitiveness; so the girl decides to observe the fox from a greater distance.

The girl finds the fox again and tries to get the animal accustomed to her. She feeds it meat. Later she can even touch the fox and is led to the new den. Finally, the fox comes to her house and she lets it inside, wanting to show it her bedroom. But the fox becomes distressed at not being able to find a way out and escapes by smashing through the brittle plate glass window, shattering the glass. The fox is hurt badly but survives. The girl learns that she cannot keep wild animals as pets at home as they are unpredictable and are not possessions.

Years later she tells the whole story to her son, as seen at the end of the film. Some versions (DVD English) replace this scene with an illustration.

== Production ==
The film was shot on the Plateau de Retord in Ain, which the film director knows well because he spent his youth there, in the summer, as well as in Abruzzo in Italy. The foxes in the film were played by six animals: Titus, Sally, Ziza, Scott, Tango and Pitchou. Titus was the fox who had been tamed by Marie-Noëlle Baroni. It died on 17 March 2008, at the advanced age of 12 years.

== Nominations ==
- Young Artist Award
  - 1. Nomination for "Best Performance in an International Feature Film - Leading Young Performer": Bertille Noël-Bruneau
  - 2. Nomination for "Best International Feature Film"

== See also ==
- Foxes in popular culture, films and literature
