= N. M. Browne =

British writer

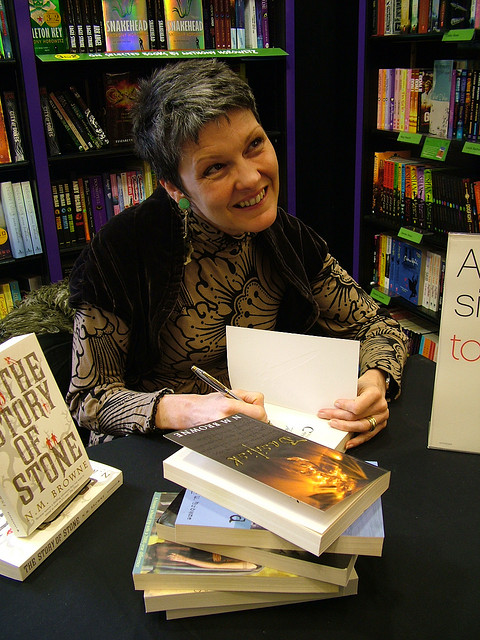
- N. M. Browne, 8 March 2008
- Born: 1960 (age 65–66); Burnley, Lancashire
- Education: New College, Oxford
- Occupation: Writer: Poet
- Spouse: Paul Browne
- Children: Four
- Relatives: Laura Matthews (fine artist)
- Writing career
- Genres: Children's literature, Young Adult Fiction, Poetry
- Notable awards: Nominated twice for Carnegie Prize: Runner-up, Lancashire Book of the Year.
- Website: nmbrowne.com

N. M. Browne is a British writer of fiction for young adults, with work that includes time travel and fantasy.

== Biography ==
She was born and brought up in Burnley, Lancashire, to Welsh parents and currently lives in London.

Browne read Philosophy and Theology at New College, Oxford, and studied to be a teacher at King's College, Cambridge. She has an MBA from Alliance Manchester Business School, and a Ph.D. in Creative Writing from Kingston University. She teaches Creative Writing at Oxford University (Continuing Education). She has taught on the MA and BA courses at Kingston University, and been module leader of "Writing for Children" and "Poetry and Prose". Browne has also taught online at Oxford University and MMU. Browne has co-led a number of Arvon week-long workshops for both young people and adults, as well as teaching Fantasy Writing at the British Council in Athens.

== Bibliography ==
- The Extraordinary Lighten-ing Conductor (1995) (as Nicola Matthews)
- The Extraordinary Adventures of Joe Sloop (1996) (as Nicola Matthews)
- The Crazy Gang series (1998- 1999) (as Nicola Matthews)
  - Og Fo Says the Space Bug
  - Do I Look Funny to You?
  - Pets Just Want to Have Fun
  - I Don’t Like Space Glop
  - Is That a Dog in the Sky?
  - This is Yum
- Warriors of Alavna (2000) Runner up Lancashire Book of the Year
- Hunted (2002) (German title Fuchsfrau, 2004)
- Warriors of Camlann (2003)
- Basilisk (2004) Nominated for Carnegie Award (Italian title Il Soffio del Basilisco 2006)
- Story of Stone (2005)
- The Spellgrinder's Apprentice (US title: Silverboy 2007) (Dutch title: De jacht op de toversteenslijper 2007)
- Shadow Web (2008) Nominated for Carnegie Award
- Warriors of Ethandun (2009)
- Wolf Blood (2011)
- Bad Water (2021)

Browne's poems have been published by Lunar Magazine, Current Archaeology, Eyewear, Indigo Dreams, Acumen, and Ink Sweat and Tears and are included in several anthologies including A Poet's Quest for God and Dear Dylan.
