= Jonathan Schork =

American artist, writer, and filmmaker

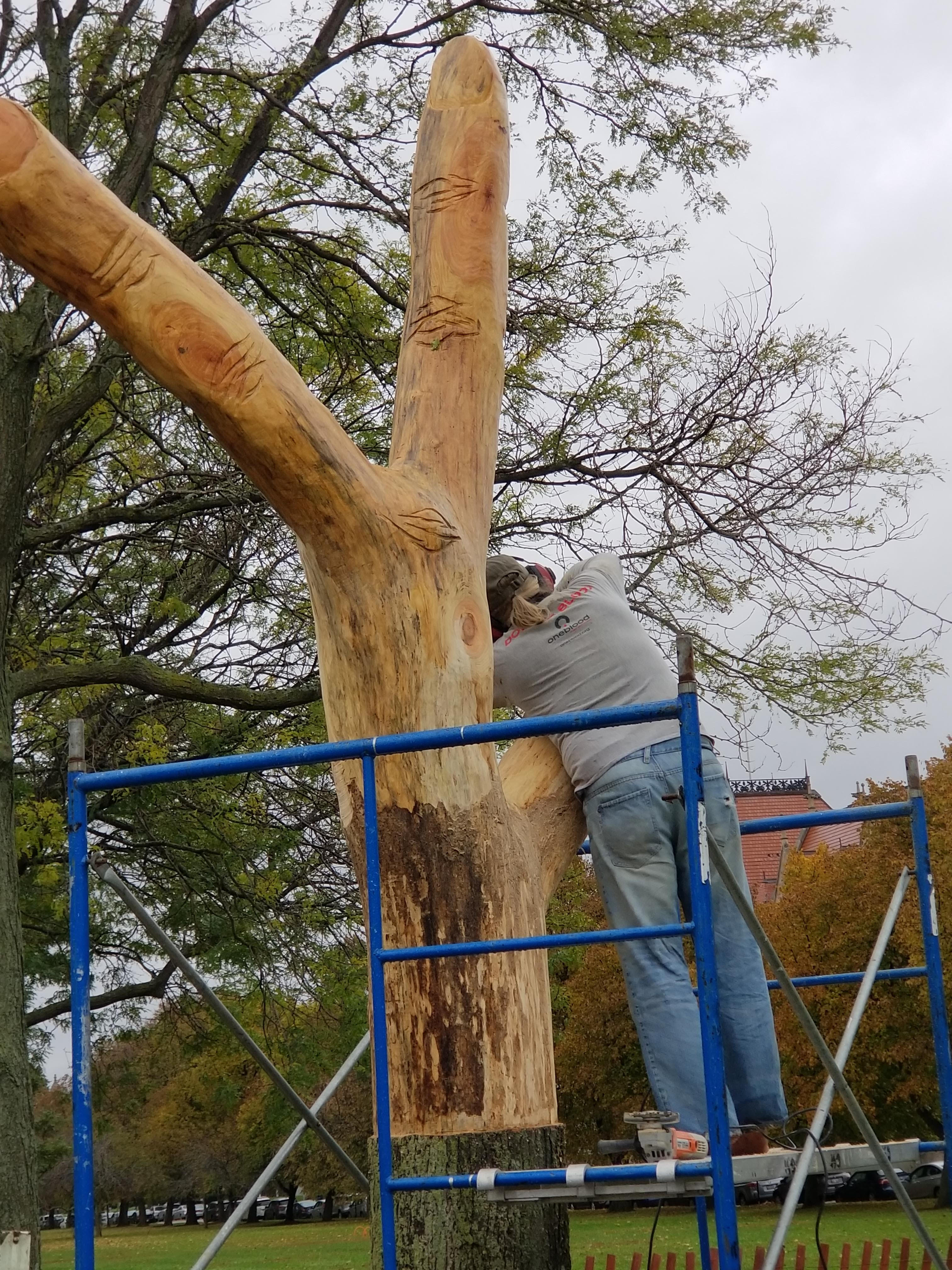

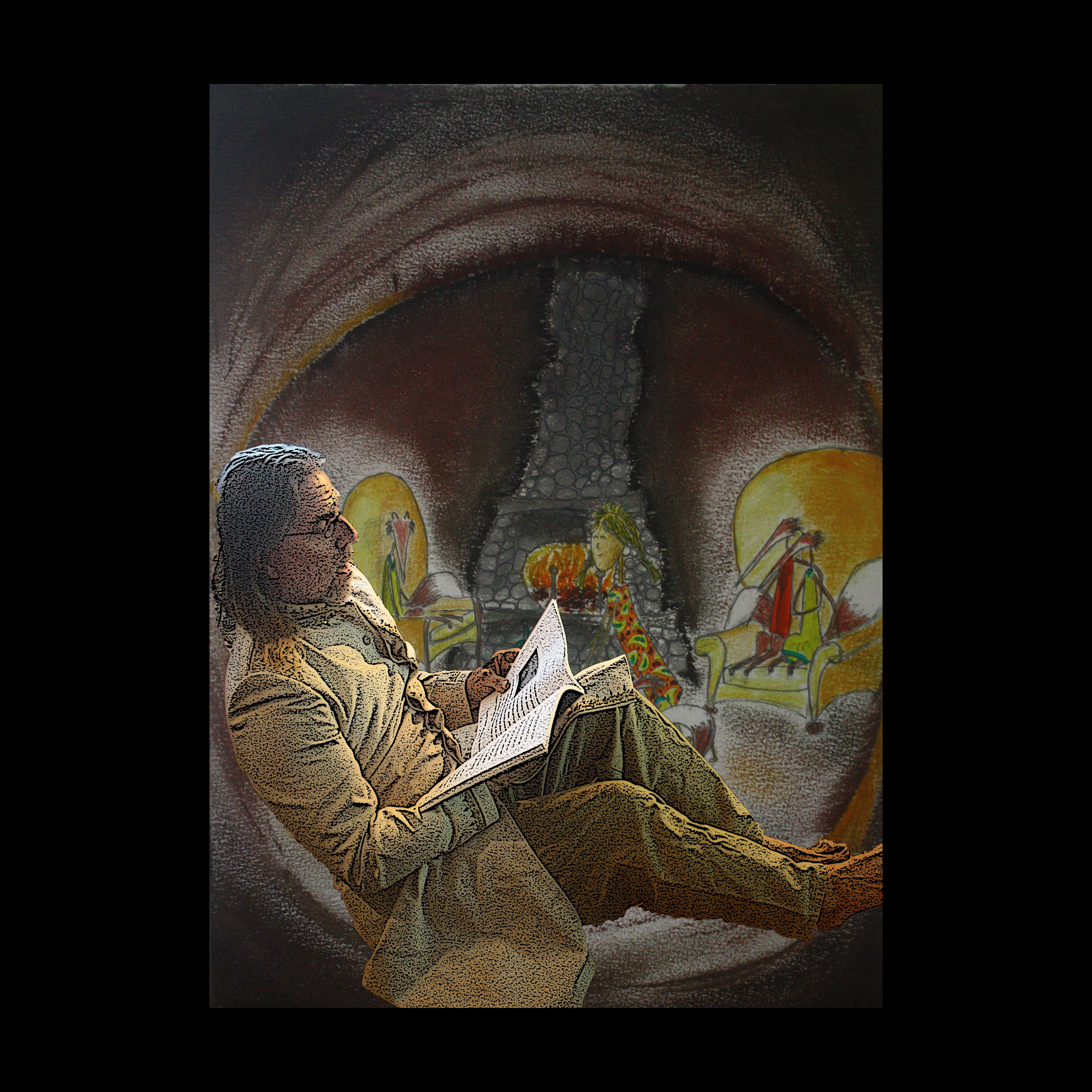
the author in an illustration from his book "the love of simon fox" (2016).

Jonathan Schork is an artist, writer, and filmmaker living in St. Petersburg, Florida.

== Early life ==
Jonathan Schork was born & raised in New York State's Hudson Valley by Fred & Carol Schork, whom he has referred to as "amazing role models": his mother taught him about magic and stoicism, his stepfather about kindness and patience, and, perhaps most unusually, how to endure love. He frequently refers to his childhood in the Catskill Mountains as a significant influence on his artistic and writing careers (his two children's books are inspired by the Catskills). He married his high school English teacher, Mary Cooke, in 1983, and volunteered in public education with her for fourteen years. He moved into a solar house in the Florida Keys in 1996, and for the next decade volunteered in the HIV community with her; they shared a volunteer-of-the-year award in 1998 at Key West's AIDSHelp, Inc. Schork was widowed in 2006.

== Fine arts ==
Schork is perhaps best known for his giant sculptures. From his studio in Key West, Florida, which he opened with his late wife Mary Cooke Hoeft in 1998, he produced artwork for the public art expo SculptureKeyWest in 2005 (Athena), 2006 (the giant wind chimes for the children of astrios & eos), 2007 (pour les enfants d'astrios et eos ii: voile, 3rd prize Grand Esplanade award), and 2010 (tsuki no mon ni: yurei no mori). In 2007, Schork transported pour les enfants d'astrios et eos ii: voile to the Burning Man festival in Nevada, where he also created the theme camp artbUS and produced and directed a movie (see below). In 2011, he was awarded a grant by Burnt Oranges, Inc., an Orlando-based Burning Man Regional organisation and another grant by the Key West art group Anne McKee Artists Fund for the sculpture le bateau des fantômes, a ship built entirely of driftwood, sticks, and tree limbs intended for a public bonfire. In 2010, in association with the Key West Garden Club, Schork built autumn leaves for jack & helena, a series of giant leaves, acorns, and mushrooms inspired by Jonathan Swift, Lewis Carroll, and "two small children who lived briefly at his house in 2007", with "original verse in English, French, Russian, and Japanese" featured on the pieces of sculpture. Other public sculpture includes a celebration wall at the Gulfport Senior Center, a giant wind chime, and a set of musical instruments in Gulfport, Florida, and a fountain in the Pinellas County Botanical Garden in Largo, Florida. His most recent monumental sculpture, Thalidomide#12, a giant hand carved from a dead honey locust in Midway Plaisance Park, Chicago, IL, is a rumination on the damage of chemical contamination, referring simultaneously to the "morning sickness" pill popular in the 1950s and 60s and the prevalence of lead in municipal drinking water in the twenty-first century.

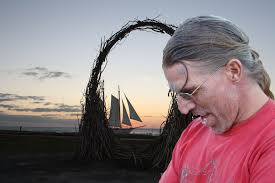
tsuki no moni: yurei no mori, key west, 2010

== Public art shows ==
Schork Is also well known for producing and curating art events. He assembled several gallery shows in the Tropic Cinema, Key West, Florida, including women's world (2009), what children see (2010) not in the park (2010), and mary's gift (2009). He produced a sculpture expo in Ramrod Key in association with the Boondocks Entertainment Complex (2008) and another in the Key West Botanical Garden (keywest artgarden, 2011), for which he also sponsored a painting & photo contest. In Gulfport, Florida, he was co-producer with Shawnna Savani of Goddess Garden Festival in 2012, and producer of the ars erotica theme show for St. Valentine's Day in 2012 and 2013.

== Gardens ==
Schork was the owner/operator & designer of the landscaping company ad terra flora in New York State from 1983 to 1996, and the Key West company vis vitae from 1996 to 2005. His specialties included Japanese & tropical gardens & architectural elements such as bridges, pagodas, shrines, & arches

== Film and video ==
Schork regards his film work as the art form he loves the most, because "it is the synthesis of everything else [he does]". His first film was the feature-length documentary voile: sails in the desert (2008), about his efforts to bring his 2007 award-winning sculpture four-thousand miles to the Nevada desert for Burning Man, and the various ways in which people interacted with the sculpture in the desert. A series of short films followed (the rings, the nightwatchman, etc...), culminating in 2011's tsuki no mon: yurei no mori (moongate: forest of ghosts)(trailer), in which his wood sculpture, covered in messages to lost loved ones, was burned in a private ceremony on Big Torch Key. Schork also participated in the Tampa Bay 48 Hour Film Project in the summers of 2012 (a rose for cecile) and 2013 (G_O_O_M_B_A_S).

== Writing ==
In 2004, in association with writer E.C.Kasteen, Schork co-authored the short story collection Diversifolio (SeaStory Press, Key West, FL). He has also written and photographed interviews (Khloe and Kourtney Kardashian), features (most notably the photo-documentary The Burning Woman at Burning Man in 2009), & dining reviews (including the Painted Heron in London, UK, and Casa Tua in Miami Beach, FL) for DISfunkshion, a Hawaii-based fashion magazine, as well as several newspaper articles, blogs on Burning Man (the magic of night), and, as "no one, perhaps", foreign travel (kamyanets-podilsky, ukraine). In April, 2015, Schork published his second book, fearless inanna; set in ancient Sumeria ca.2800bce, it follows the adventures of a teen girl trying to rescue her parents from the curse of a dragon. With references to the Gilgamesh Epic, fearless inanna features a twenty-five page glossary and fourteen original illustrations by the author,. His third book, the illustrated children's fairytale The Love of Simon Fox, featuring a talking fox who lives in an enchanted forest, was published in February, 2016. In October, 2016, independent publisher SM-ARC, inc. (501(c)3), launched his fourth book under the nom de Japonaise Hitori Arukimasu, a collection of art & philosophy titled A View From the Tendo, and in Juli, 2017, his fifth book, The Bathroom Rule, a collection of ten short plays .

The 2018 More Tales from the Enchanted Wood, an illustrated sequel to The Love of Simon Fox, has won book awards from The 2018 Literary Classics Book Awards, who wrote, "Lovers of the written word rejoice. For we have encountered, with much merriment, a delightful anthology of short stories by Jonathan Schork. More Tales from the Enchanted Wood is the charming continuation of The Love of Simon Fox, a selection of readings about a magical forest and its inhabitants. It is not necessary to have read The Love of Simon Fox to appreciate this book. But one would certainly benefit from beginning with the former. For those who enjoy a good fairy tale, and for those who are in love with the written word, we highly recommend More Tales from the Enchanted Wood. This book has earned the Literary Classics Seal of Approval and is recommended for home and school libraries", and The 2018 Royal Dragonfly Book Awards.

official website
