= Claude Lorius =

French glaciologist (1932–2023)

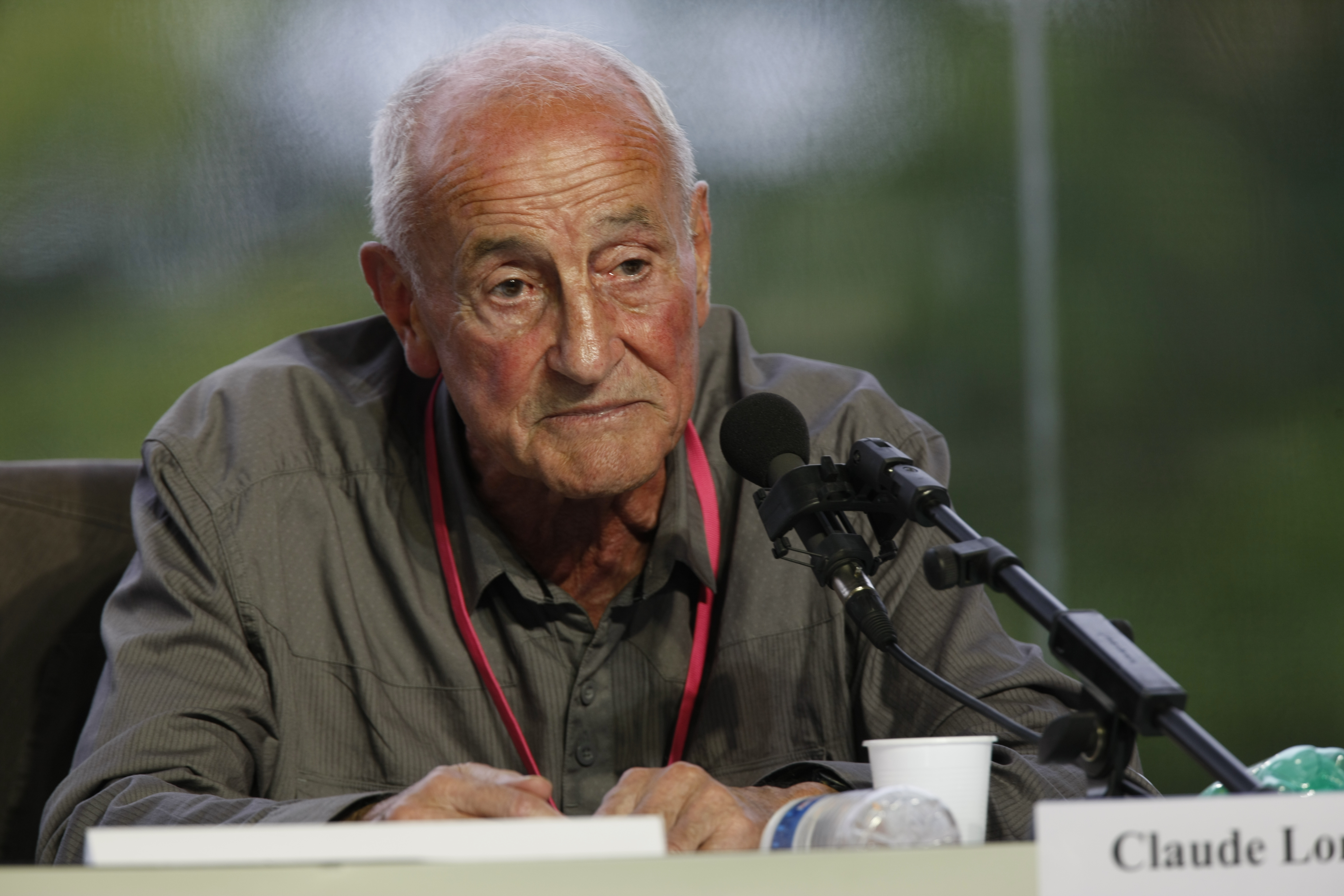
- Lorius in 2009
- Born: 27 February 1932; Besançon, France
- Died: 21 March 2023 (aged 91); Charnay-lès-Mâcon, France
- Education: University of Franche-Comté
- Awards: CNRS Gold Medal (2002)
- Scientific career
- Fields: Glaciology

Claude Lorius (27 February 1932 – 21 March 2023) was a French glaciologist. He was director emeritus of research at CNRS. He was the director of the Laboratoire de glaciologie et géophysique de l'environnement in Grenoble from 1983 to 1988.

Lorius took part in more than 20 polar expeditions, mostly to Antarctica, and helped organise many international collaborations, notably the Vostok Station ice core. He was instrumental in the discovery and interpretation of the palaeo-atmosphere information within ice cores.

Lorius died on 21 March 2023, at the age of 91.

== Awards ==
- Grand Officer of the Légion d'honneur, 2020
- Bower Medal and Prize, Franklin Institute, 2017, 2017
- Commandeur of the Légion d'honneur, 2009
- Blue Planet Prize, 2008
- Vernadsky medal of the EGU, 2006
- CNRS Gold medal, 2002
- Balzan Prize 2001 for climatology
- Tyler Prize for Environmental Achievement, 1996
- Officer of the Légion d'honneur, 1998
- Member of the French Academy of Sciences, 1994
- Italgas Prize, 1994
- Belgica Medal, 1989
- Humboldt Prize, 1988

== Bibliography ==
- Imbert, Bertrand; Lorius, Claude (2007). Le grand défi des pôles. Collection "Découvertes Gallimard" (in French). Vol. 15 (Revised ed.). Paris: Éditions Gallimard. (originally released in 1987 written by Bertrand Imbert, Claude Lorius is the co-author of the revised edition released in 2007) ISBN 9782070763320
  - U.S. edition – Imbert, Bertrand (1992). North Pole, South Pole: Journeys to the Ends of the Earth. "Abrams Discoveries" series. New York: Harry N. Abrams.
  - UK edition – Imbert, Bertrand (1992). North Pole, South Pole: Journeys to the Ends of the Earth. 'New Horizons' series. London: Thames & Hudson.
- L'Antarctique, (1997) with Roger Gendrin, coll. « Dominos », éditions Flammarion, ISBN 978-2080355164
- 365 jours sous les glaces de l'antarctique (tr. "365 days on the ice of Antarctica"), (2008) with Roland Schlich et Djamel Tahi, éditions Glénat ISBN 9782723466073
- Lorius, Claude; Carpentier, Laurent (2011). Voyage dans l'anthropocène: cette nouvelle ère dont nous sommes les héros. (in French). Paris: Actes Sud ISBN 9782742795345
- Jouzel, Jean; Claude Lorius; Dominique Raynaud (2012). The white planet : the evolution and future of our frozen world. Princeton, N.J.: Princeton University Press. ISBN 9780691144993.
- Mémoires sauvées des glaces (tr. "Memories saved from the ice"), (2016) story collected by Djamel Tahi, Flammarion editions, ISBN 978-2081375895

== See also ==
- Ice and the Sky, a documentary film about Lorius' work in Antarctica
