= Finding the Fox =

Novel by Ali Sparkes

- Author: Ali Sparkes
- Illustrator: David Wyatt
- Language: English
- Series: The Shapeshifter
- Genre: Fantasy/Science fiction
- Publisher: Oxford University Press
- Publication date: 2006
- Publication place: England
- Pages: 328
- Preceded by: None
- Followed by: Running the Risk

Finding the Fox is a fantasy/science fiction novel by Ali Sparkes. It is the first book in The Shapeshifter series, and was first published in 2006 by Oxford University Press.

== Themes and topics ==
The book explores such themes such as familial abuse, emotional repression, government suspicion, found family and absentee parenthood.

== Publication history ==
As with all of the Shapeshifter books, Finding the Fox was published by Oxford University Press in 2006.

== Recognition ==
Finding the Fox was nominated for the 2007 Bolton Children's Book Award, the Dutch Kinderboekenweek, and was awarded the number one book in 2002.
