= Sly Fox and Birdie =

- Directed by: Dennis Kennedy
- Written by: Dennis Kennedy
- Produced by: Operation Lifesaver; Edward Trandahl (executive producer)
- Starring: Jeanette Barnhouse; Otis Twelve
- Production company: Kennedy Studios
- Distributed by: Union Pacific Railroad
- Release date: 1992
- Running time: 10 minutes
- Country: United States
- Language: English

Sly Fox and Birdie is a 1992 educational video produced by Operation Lifesaver and distributed by the Union Pacific Railroad. It shows two characters, a yellow bird named Birdie and a fox named Sly Fox, learning about railroad safety. In 2006, an updated version was made which features a railway safety rap musical number.

== Plot ==
We see a yellow bird named Birdie wake up one morning. She decides that it is too nice a day to lie around in her nest, and she goes flying. She passes over trees, rooftops, playgrounds, and finally railroad tracks. She spots her friend Sly Fox right near them.

Birdie asks what he is doing, and we learn that Sly Fox is going to put a few items on the tracks (a rock, a can, an old spike), assuming that when the train "comes roarin' by, it'll squash them to pieces!" A fearful Birdie tells him that it is a bad idea and gives Sly Fox a "thinking cap," telling him that when the train comes by, it won't squash them, it'll send them shooting out like bullets, or could have the train derailed and overturned, thus leading to possible injury or death.

Sly Fox comprehends this, but instead chooses to wait for the train to come so he can throw the items at it. Birdie informs him that the engineer might get hurt with the things he throws, and suggests that they do something else fun, like going to the park. Sly Fox suggests that Birdie go get herself a worm.

The fox comes across some boxcars, and hops into one, assuming that they can't hurt anyone. But then, Birdie shows up and tells him that a locomotive could be at the end of the line, and if it coupled with the last car and start moving, the boxcar they're standing in would shake, and (again) they could be injured or killed. Sly Fox hops out of the car and decides that they should take a hike on the railroad tracks.

Birdie points out that it is dangerous to cross tracks, especially on bridges and tunnels, the latter of which finally convinces Sly Fox about the dangers of railroads (he is run over in the process, to which he replies "If I weren't a cartoon character, I'd be dead as a doornail.") Sly now decides that he would just stand and wave at the train as it goes by; Birdie points out that he shouldn't be too close, pointing out that they could be carrying heavy objects.

Sly and Birdie talk about what to do at railroad crossings: stop if a train is coming and obey the signs and signals. If your car stalls on the tracks and won't budge, get out as fast as you can (the latter is demonstrated by Sly parking his car on a crossing, then abandoning the car before it explodes as a train hits it.)

Sly Fox comments on how Birdie is a lifesaver, and hopes that other people can learn from her. Birdie breaks the fourth wall by telling him that people have been watching them, and Sly Fox hopes that they have learned a lesson from all of this. The movie ends with the two parting off.

== Cast ==
- Jeanette Barnhouse as Birdie
- Otis Twelve as Sly Fox
