= Honor of Kings =

Multiplayer online battle arena video game

- Developer: TiMi Studio Group
- Publishers: Tencent Games (mainland China); Level Infinite (global)
- Director: Li Min (game director)
- Composers: 2WEI; Alexandre Desplat; Elliot Leung; Edouard Brenneisen; Bastien Rousset; Laurent Courbier; Dmitrii Miachin; Ting Si Hao; Jingqing Xu; Obadiah Brown-Beach; Thomas Parisch; Neal Acree; Hongfei Zhao; Hiromi Mizutani; Matthew Carl Earl; Edwin Wendler; Qiandan Zhang; Daniel James; Ramin Djawadi; Robert A. Wolf; Jing Zhang; Howard Shore; Hans Zimmer; Zeneth; Lorne Balfe
- Platforms: Android, iOS, HarmonyOS
- Release: CN: 25 October 2015; (Original domestic version): WW: 20 June 2024; (Global version)
- Genre: Multiplayer online battle arena
- Modes: Multiplayer, single-player (bots)

Honor of Kings (simplified Chinese: 王者荣耀; traditional Chinese: 王者榮耀; pinyin: Wángzhě Róngyào, unofficially translated as King's Glory, or alternatively transliterated as Wangzhe Rongyao) is a multiplayer online battle arena (MOBA) video game developed by TiMi Studio Group and published by Tencent Games for iOS, HarmonyOS NEXT, and Android.

The game was first released in mainland China on 25 October 2015. In October 2016, an international adaptation, Arena of Valor, was released, utilizing the same game engine but altering the user interfaces and heroes to accommodate the Western market. As of November 2020, Honor of Kings had over 100 million daily active players, making it one of the most popular games in the world. It is the highest-grossing mobile game of all time (Note: Honor of King / Arena of Valor: 2016 – $1.61 billion+; 2017–2018 – $4.91 billion; 2019 – $1.5 billion; 2020 – $2.564 billion+; January to 14 December – $2.5 billion; 25–31 December (China) – $64 million; 2021 (1 January to 14 December) – $2.8 billion) and one of the most downloaded apps globally.

In June 2022, Level Infinite, the publisher of Arena of Valor, announced that Honor of Kings would be released globally through a separate version by the end of 2022. In May 2024, the worldwide launch of the global version was announced for 20 June 2024, following pre-releases in Brazil and Turkey as well as countries in the Middle East and North Africa, South Asia, and the Commonwealth of Independent States. Honor of Kings was the highest-grossing mobile game in the world in 2024, with $2.6 billion gross.

== Overview ==
Honor of Kings is a quick-match (15–20 minutes) mobile multiplayer online battle arena (MOBA) game. Either a Tencent QQ account or a WeChat account is required to play the game. Following an update on 24 September 2020, a player can add friends and invite people from different platforms to guilds.

Honor of Kings was the second-highest earning mobile game worldwide for February 2021, with $218.5 million in gross revenue, which represented 57.2% year-over-year growth from February 2020. About 95.6% of Honor of Kings' revenue was from China, followed by 1.6% from Thailand.

== Gameplay ==
Honor of Kings is a multiplayer online battle arena (MOBA) game in which players control characters with unique abilities and compete to defeat non-player characters and other players to gain experience points and gold. With experience points, players can unlock their characters' abilities or further enhance the power of their existing abilities. The highest level that each hero can reach in the game is level 15. Each level gained not only improves the attributes of the character controlled by the player but also grants a skill point that can be used to upgrade the character's skills. There is a character called Jiang Ziya in the game who can use his unique "Fengshen" skill to remove the level limit for himself and another character. However, after level 15, he can only improve the character's attributes. Gold can be used to purchase items from the shop that change specific character attributes.

To win a game, players must knock down the enemy team's defensive structures, called turrets. Victory is achieved by destroying the opponent's base crystal, which is located within the enemy team's base. Specific gameplay mechanics vary depending on the game mode chosen.

Experience points and gold are earned across matches and are applied to player accounts. Accounts start at level 1, with level 30 being the maximum level. In the global release, however, the level cap is removed. When players level up, they receive bonus in-game rewards. Leveling up also unlocks certain summoner abilities that can be applied to every hero the summoner uses. Gold can be used for various purposes, such as purchasing new heroes.

=== Types of damage ===
Physical damage is the most common type of damage in the game and is indicated by damage numbers in red. Physical damage can be reduced by armor.

Magical damage is indicated by damage numbers in purple. Magical damage can be reduced by magical resistance.

True damage is the most powerful damage. This damage cannot be reduced by armor; it can be only reduced by damage-reduction buffs or skills. Damage numbers appear in white. Shields that block true damage are possessed by only a few characters; these shields are represented by a yellow section on the health bar.

Critical damage deals massive damage when a critical hit occurs. It can be physical, magical or true damage.

=== Game modes ===
Honor of Kings has a variety of game modes, most of which focus on competitive matchmaking. Without a network connection, players can play the stand-alone mode. With a network connection, players can choose from a variety of battle modes, in which players can either face off against each other in player versus player matches (including 1v1, 2v2, 3v3, and 5v5) or participate in various player versus environment adventure modes.

In each of the player versus player modes, players can choose to battle AI-controlled (computer-controlled) opponents. The AI difficulty can be set to easy, normal, or hard. Players can also create rooms where they can invite and battle friends, recent teammates, or recent opponents. There is also an option to create a 5v5 draft room, in which participants are invited by other players in the room.

==== Rift of Kings (5v5) ====
Rift of Kings (known as Hero's Gorge in the international release) is the most commonly played game mode. This mode is used in KPL competitions. The ranked game mode uses the same game map. Ten players, each controlling a hero, are split into two opposing teams of five. The teams start at opposite ends of the map. The objective is to destroy the enemy team's defensive turrets in order to reach and destroy the enemy's Nexus base. The turrets are located along the three main lanes: the Clash Lane (对抗路), the Middle Lane (中路), and the Farm Lane (发育路). These lanes are used to reach the enemy's Nexus base. Nexus bases can restore health points slowly but defense turrets cannot.

Heroes are supported by minions, which are periodically sent from their team's base. Without minion support, heroes can be damaged by turrets. Turrets prioritize enemy minions within their vicinity, but will immediately target enemy heroes if they attack allied heroes within the turret's range. Players can level up their heroes and earn coins by killing enemy minions, heroes, or wild creatures in the jungle (野区), the area between the lanes.

Some creatures in the jungle area also provide certain status effect benefits known as buffs, which enhance a hero's attributes. There are five types of buffs: blue, red, Tyrant, Overlord, and Tempest Dragon (the strongest). For example, the blue buff is used to regenerate or improve mana, a resource which is used by heroes such as Mages and Assassins. The red buff is used to decrease the moving speed of the enemies, and it also deals a small amount of true damage, which cannot be blocked by shields or defense points. This buff is useful for Warriors and Marksmen. Both the blue and red buffs last for 80 seconds.

==== Ranked matchmaking (5v5) ====
Once a player's account reaches level 6 and owns at least five heroes, they are able to participate in ranked matchmaking.

There are a total of 7 major matchmaking tiers, namely Stubborn Bronze, Orderly Silver, Glorious Gold, Noble Platinum, Eternal Diamond, Master Star, and Supreme King, in ascending order. Each major tier is further subdivided into several smaller tiers, denoted by their respective Roman numerals in descending order. The Bronze and Silver tiers each have three sub-tiers (called Bronze III–I and Silver III–I); the Gold and Platinum tiers each have four sub-tiers (called Gold IV–I and Platinum IV–I); the Diamond and Master tiers each have five sub-tiers (called Diamond V–I and Master V–I). The King tier uses a star system to determine rankings. When King tier players reach 10, 20, 30, 40, 50, or 100 stars, they are promoted to Extraordinary King, Unrivaled King, Peerless King, Sagely King, Glorious King, or Legendary King, respectively. Legendary King is the highest rank players can achieve.

Players can enter matchmaking either solo or in groups of two, three, or five. Groups of five are matched only against other groups of five, and the same applies to groups of three. The game's matchmaking system selects suitable teammates and opponents based on the players' ranks and win rates. However, there are rank restrictions for teams participating in ranked matches. With the exception of five-player groups, the difference between the highest-ranked and lowest-ranked players on a team cannot exceed two ranks.

In each ranked game, stars can be gained or lost depending on the outcome of the match. Winning a match grants the player one star, while losing deducts one star. Each Bronze and Silver sub-tier requires three stars for promotion, each Gold and Platinum sub-tier requires four stars, and each Diamond and Master sub-tier requires five stars. When a player wins a match and reaches the maximum number of stars for their current sub-tier, they are promoted to the next sub-tier or major tier. Losing a match while having no stars in a sub-tier results in the loss of an additional star.

==== Top Match ====
This mode is designed for expert and highly skilled players. Participation requires a rank of at least Super King with one star. Players in Top Match cannot team up with players of other ranks. Player nicknames are hidden and replaced with labels ranging from “Top Player 1” to “Top Player 10.”

==== The Match seasons, Honor-Point system and Eagle-Eye Players ====
The Honor-Point system provides an alternative way to protect stars. For example, points can be earned in every match by not disconnecting during gameplay. Once earned, these points are automatically used to prevent the loss of a star. After the star protection is activated, the points are reset to zero. Players may also qualify to become an Eagle-Eye Player—someone who monitors other players’ in-game performance and penalizes misconduct—by accumulating the maximum number of Honor Points and completing several tasks.

Matchmaking rankings are reset periodically, with each reset marking the beginning of a new competitive season. Each season lasts approximately three to four months, and season rewards are granted based on the highest rank each player achieves. Each season offers two skins that must be purchased with VIP rewards. Earning season points through the season portal grants players season tokens (which can be used to purchase chests or skin fragments and are only valid for a single season), free skin chest, diamonds, and other special effects. The rank a player achieves at the end of a season is also used to determine their starting rank for the next season. The amount by which their rank decreases depends on the number of stars they have accumulated.

==== Battle of Changping (3v3) ====
The basic rules are similar to those of other game modes, with a total of six players (three on each team). However, unlike other 5v5 game modes, this mode features only one lane leading to the enemy's base, with two jungle areas on either side. Each team has two defense turrets, compared to three in the standard 5v5 mode. The victory conditions are the same as those in standard 5v5 game modes.

==== Mo Zi's Lane of Gear (1v1) ====
This is a single combat mode with only two players facing each other. In this mode, each player has only one defense turret, and there are no jungle areas. Players win by destroying their opponent's turret.

=== Arcade modes ===
In this section, there are multiple game modes containing different buffs and playing methods.

==== Infinite Brawl (5v5) ====
The basic rules are similar to those of Valley of Kings; however, this game mode has a faster pace. The defense turrets have lower health, and the minions move faster. Every hero starts at level 2 and can gain gold and levels faster. The average match lasts approximately ten minutes. Random buffs are created every two minutes, such as the cooling down time of abilities shortened by 40%, the damage of abilities increased by 30%, the movement of heroes increased by 150 points, and the attack speed of the turrets decreased by 50%.

Additional abilities include a hook, which can drag an opponent to the player's side, and invisibility, which is removed when the player fights or goes near an opponent. This game mode requires players to dynamically adjust tactics according to the buffs to achieve victory.

==== Dreamland Clash (5v5) ====
In this mode, heroes are assigned randomly. Players can spend diamonds to obtain a new random hero, while the previously offered hero is added to a selection pool from which their teammates can choose. Once a player leaves the spawn area, they can no longer buy weapons until they respawn. The arena has a single middle lane and a path that can generate healing items or buffs. As the match progresses, the path gradually collapses, leaving one main lane for combat. The minions are slightly different as well. Some minions display a healing sign; when defeated by a hero, it drops a healing prop. When a player destroys their opponent's second turret, special minions with more attack damage are generated.

==== King's Chess ====
King's Chess is an auto battler, with eight players in each match. On each turn, players are presented with five random cards representing different heroes. Players can spend gold to purchase the heroes and place them on their own chess board. More powerful heroes cost more gold. Each hero starts with one star, and having three same heroes grants two stars. The maximum star level is three. Once all players have placed their heroes on the board, battles take place between pairs of players, with the defeated player losing health points. These battles continue over successive rounds until only one player remains. The ranking system is similar to that of Ranked Matching (5v5).

==== Fiery Mountain Battle (5v5) ====
Gaming arena of Fiery Mountain Battle

This arena is circular and divided into three main lanes (top, middle, and bottom). Each player will randomly spawn at either location A or location B. Each player starts with 800 gold, level 2, and an additional ability called fireball. Jungle creatures spawn at locations 1, 2, and 3. The area outside each lane is filled with lava, which slows and damages players. Each game has a time limit of ten minutes; the first team to reach thirty kills wins immediately.

The additional ability of fireball causes no damage, but has a knockback effect. This game mode has three types of random buffs, including 30 seconds of control-free effect, increased movement speed, and increased cooldown speed by 40%. The respawn time for each player is 15 seconds, after which they respawn at a random location within the arena.

==== Clone Fight (5v5) ====
The Clone Fight opens from Friday to Sunday. A few heroes are banned to ensure fair gameplay. The basic rules are similar to those of Rift of Kings; however, the hero selection process is different. In each game, the five players on each team vote for heroes. The hero with the most votes is selected for the entire team to use throughout the match. If there is a tie, the system will choose one hero randomly. Both teams could use the same hero as well.

==== Special modes ====
Some arcade modes appear only rarely, such as Awakening Brawl or Snow Racetrack. These modes are playable only on special days, such as 55 Gaming Day or during the 2022 Beijing Winter Olympics.

=== Characters ===
Players may choose from a wide variety of heroes, each with special abilities, cosmetic skins and backstories. There are a total of 125 heroes, generally classified into six roles: Tank, Fighter, Assassin, Mage, Marksman, and Support. Some heroes originate from Chinese mythology (such as Pangu), while others are famous people from Chinese history (such as Guan Yu). The game also has its own heroes (such as Luban No. 7) based on its original story.

When controlling a character, players can listen to famous quotations that express the character's personality. Many of these are excerpted or adapted from classical poetry or popular movies.

In Arena of Valor, most Chinese characters are replaced by American and Japanese heroes, including Batman, The Flash, and Jinnar. The more recognizable figures that remain, like Sun Wukong, are visually re-designed for Western audiences. Currently, there are three Arena of Valor heroes (Allain, Ata, and Butterfly) which have been transferred to the global server of Honor of Kings, with Allain being transferred to the Chinese server as well. Additionally, Ata replaces Zhu Bajie from the Chinese server to avoid causing offense through the portrayal of pig characters in video games.

== Development ==
=== History ===
After Tencent fully acquired Riot Games in 2015, Tencent asked them to make a mobile version of League of Legends, as multiplayer online battle arena (MOBA) games were very rare on mobile at the time, with Vainglory by Super Evil Megacorp (formed by ex-employees of Riot Games) being the only notable title. Tencent wanted to seize the opportunity to dominate the underserved mobile market.

However, Riot Games declined, as mobile was not commonly seen as a platform for competitive games; it claimed that the gameplay of League of Legends could not be replicated on smartphones. Despite the refusal, the video game development studios Lightspeed & Quantum Studios and TiMi Studios (both owned by Tencent) raced to develop a MOBA game that met Tencent's requirements, resulting in an internal competition.

Lightspeed & Quantum's We MOBA and TiMi's League of Kings (rough translation from 王者联盟; Wángzhě Liánméng) were launched on the same day, on 18 August 2015. A month later, We MOBA was already the third most-downloaded mobile game on Apple's iOS worldwide, according to app analytics firm App Annie, while League of Kings trailed far behind. League of Kings was taken down for an overhaul, and later relaunched in October 2015. TiMi Studios used League of Legends as a base model when overhauling League of Kings, resulting in many similarities between the two games. League of Kings also implemented a 5v5 game mode because its original 3v3 format had received a poor reception. This time, League of Kings overtook We MOBA and won the internal competition; Tencent subsequently invested additional resources in League of Kings to ensure its success.

Nevertheless, Riot Games deemed that the design of characters and abilities in League of Kings was "blatantly ripping off the intellectual property of League of Legends" after they discovered how the game was produced, and reportedly brought these concerns to Tencent.

Tencent responded that they would change its own game enough to sell as a standalone product with no relation to League of Legends. Despite this, League of Kings had already gained massive popularity in China at this point due to the game being advertised as a "mobile version of League of Legends" through social media and word-of-mouth marketing.

Tencent felt that it was too late to make huge changes to the game. Only necessary changes were made, and the game was renamed from League of Kings (王者联盟; Wángzhě Liánméng) to Honor of Kings (王者荣耀; Wángzhě Róngyào) on 26 November 2015 (marked as the official release date). The international release of Honor of Kings was cancelled; instead, the game was rebranded and featured different content for markets outside mainland China. This led to the creation of Arena of Valor, which also served as a response to Riot Games' complaints of "potential intellectual property infringement".

Arena of Valor was reported to have caused a gradually straining business relationship between Riot Games and Tencent. Tensions increased when Tencent used notable League of Legends players to promote Arena of Valor and its esports tournaments. Riot Games' complaints initiated a two-month marketing freeze for Arena of Valor and demands that Riot Games would be given the option to review all marketing plans, including a veto for use of select celebrity gamers. Nonetheless, Riot Games implied that their relationship with Tencent was still strong, and the conflict between them and their games was only "a bump in the road".

Riot Games eventually acknowledged the potential of the mobile market for the MOBA genre, and agreed to develop a mobile title for League of Legends. Tencent then temporarily pulled marketing plans for Arena of Valor in Europe and North America in 2019, clearing room for Riot Games' announcement a few months later. Riot Games announced their own mobile MOBA game, League of Legends: Wild Rift on 16 October 2019, the 10th anniversary of League of Legends.

By the end of May 2017, 54% of the game's players were female; a significant difference from the general trend of esports.

The success of the MOBA genre on mobile inspired the creation of Pokémon Unite, a Pokémon spin-off game developed by TiMi Studio in partnership with The Pokémon Company.

=== Revenue model ===
In 2016, the game had more than 50 million daily active users and more than 200 million registered users. The game grossed ¥10.4 billion ($1.61 billion) in the last quarter of 2016. In November 2016, Honor of Kings topped in the "China IP index value list – top 10" at the 2016 China pan entertainment festival. In May 2017, it became the highest-grossing mobile game in the world. It had 160 million monthly active users. In May 2017, entertainer Lu Han was named ambassador of the game. In the month of February 2019, the game generated $1 billion. In 2020, the game grossed over $2.45 billion, becoming the highest earning game of the year.

Honor of Kings contributed about 50% of the Tencent's mobile gaming revenues in 2017 and it made about ¥3 billion in gross revenue in April 2017 ($435 million). In June 2017, the analysis company APP Annie reported that Honor of Kings was the number 1 mobile game (excluding Android games) in the world in terms of income generated, with first quarter revenue of the game reaching $1.76 billion. A cosmetic hero skin of Zhao Yun also had sold for $22 million in one day. At the time, Tencent reported 200 million registered users with 50 million daily active users. The game grossed $911 million in the second quarter of 2017. Between the last quarter of 2016 and the second quarter of 2017, the game grossed $4.281 billion.

In response to the national day of mourning designated by China on 4 April 2020, for those who had given up their lives or had died from the COVID-19 pandemic, all of Tencent's games announced a 24-hour suspension of service, which included Honor of Kings.

=== Soundtrack ===
The game's original soundtrack was composed by Hans Zimmer, Jeff Broadbent, Lorne Balfe, and Duncan Watt, and was performed and recorded by The Chamber Orchestra of London at Abbey Road Studios in London.

A soundtrack album was released on 28 October 2015. The extended soundtrack, released a year later, included music composed for every special event since the game's release. Multiple score composers collaborated on the album, including Howard Shore, Thomas Parisch, and Marcin Przybylowicz.

The theme music for Years 3 and 4 was composed by Neal Acree. Additional music was provided by Matthew Carl Earl, Obadiah Brown-Beach, and Angela Little.

On 25 January 2020, Unisonar released the game's score digitally for the first time internationally. The score's executive producers are Sam Yang and Cheney Wu, with coordination by Channel Chen, production by Vivita Zheng and Thomas Parisch, and Hongfei Zhao serving as music director. The album, Honor of Kings Original Game Soundtrack, Vol. 1, consists of 16 original tracks, and was produced by TiMi Audio.

On 9 August 2024, Honor of Kings Original Game Soundtrack Collection 2024 was released on streaming platforms in celebration of the global launch, featuring music from composers Laurent Courbier, Dmitrii Miachin, Ting Si Hao, and Jing Zhang.

== Esports ==
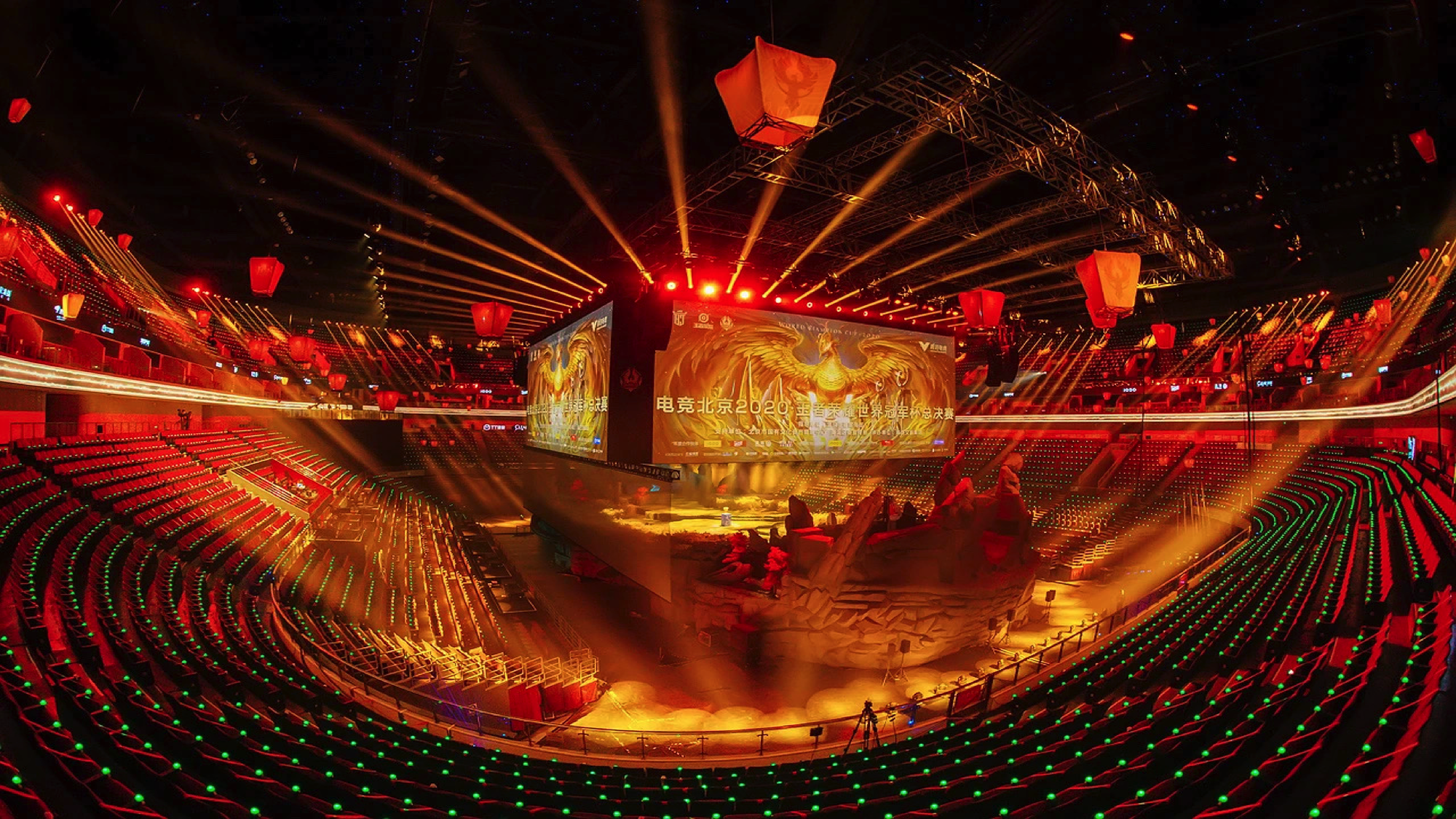
2020 Honor of Kings World Champion Cup

Honor of Kings is one of the most popular esports in its home country of China. The Champion Cup was introduced in 2016 shortly after the launch of the game and became an annual event, and later renamed to the World Champion Cup. It was considered the game's equivalent to the League of Legends World Championship. A professional league for Honor of Kings, the King Pro League (KPL), was launched later that year in China. While the World Champion Cup brought in teams from other countries, most participants were Chinese, alongside some teams from South Korea, who had their own competition named the Korea King Pro League (KRKPL); this was mainly due to Arena of Valor and their separate esports scene in Southeast Asia, Europe and the Americas.

In August 2021, Honor of Kings and Arena of Valor announced an "esports convergence", with teams from both titles to compete in their own unified world championship event. This would turn into the Honor of Kings International Championship (KIC), which occurred in 2022 and 2023. During both tournaments, the KPL teams from China dominated their international competition, with only one team from outside the KPL making playoffs during the 2023 International Championship, when the KPL sent seven teams as opposed to eight. Brazil would also develop the first professional league for the game outside of China, known as the Campeonato de Honor of Kings Brazil (CHOKBR).

As Honor of Kings expanded internationally, the remaining Arena of Valor teams from Taiwan (Chinese Taipei), Thailand and Vietnam removed themselves from the game's ecosystem in 2024. During that year, the game used an "Invitational Series" format outside of China, which also corresponded with the title's first appearance at the Esports World Cup in Saudi Arabia. The KPL teams would instead form their own end-of-season tournament similar to the Champion Cups of old, known as the KPL Grand Finals.

In 2025, Honor of Kings would start additional professional leagues outside of China with Tencent investing $15 million for it. These are: the Philippines Kings League (PKL), MY Honor of Kings League (MKL), Indonesia Kings Laga (IKL), Wildcard Kings Series (WKS, for teams in Southeast Asia outside of the Philippines, Malaysia and Indonesia), Honor of Kings Major West League (KMW, for teams in Europe, North America and Latin America) and Honor of Kings Major East League (KME, for teams in MENA, South Asia, Korea and Japan). The professional league revamp was revealed during the grand final of Honor of Kings Invitational Season 4 (KIS4) with WKS, KME and KMW leagues combined into one singular league called Kings Major League (KML). The game was selected as one of the titles for Asian Games 2026 in esports category and Esports Nations Cup (ENC). The number of participating teams increased to 10 for all major leagues with best-of-5 (BO5) format applied to the group stage and best-of-7 (BO7) format in all knockout stage matches. In addition, Arena of Valor teams would be invited to participate in the Honor of Kings World Cup that year, with Thailand, Vietnam and Taiwan's league winners qualifying for the event.

== Collaborations and events ==
=== Collaborations ===
Honor of Kings has collaborated with different companies, media franchises, and personalities. As of January 2026, these include Lionel Messi, SNK, Lee Chong Wei, Hello Kitty, Jujutsu Kaisen, Fox Spirit Matchmaker, Disney's Frozen, Vegetables Fairy, B.Duck, Sanrio, Bleach: Thousand-Year Blood War, Jurassic World Rebirth, Detective Conan, the Sanxingdui Museum, and Lord of Mysteries. The developer has also collaborated with smartphone brands for marketing such as iQOO, Tecno, Infinix and realme.

=== Events ===
During Chinese New Year in 2024, five dragon-themed skins were released to celebrate the 2024 Year of the Dragon.

To celebrate the 2025 Year of the Snake, Honor of Kings released a new serpent-themed game mode.

In November 2025, Honor of Kings released a new series of skins for Donghuang, Milady, and Biron, inspired by Latin American, Southeast Asian and Middle Eastern cultures and folklore.

To celebrate the 2026 Tiger Spirits, five tiger-themed skins were released.

== In other media ==
Honor of Kings was featured in episode 14 of the anthology series Secret Level.

== Controversies ==
In March 2017, Honor of Kings was criticized by Guangming Daily for distorting Chinese history. Guangming Daily wrote that the game characters were inconsistent with historical narratives and traditional mythological narratives, and that it was keeping teenagers from forming authentic historical views. People's Daily republished these criticisms, including on its WeChat account and on Weibo.

Criticism by Guangming Daily and People's Daily also prompted contrary responses in Chinese media. China Daily wrote that some ancient Chinese poems appearing in Honor of Kings had become popular. 21st Century Business Reviewer wrote that by re-writing traditional stories in a modern style, Honor of Kings enriched national culture.

In April 2017, Tencent responded by adding introductions to the characters adapted from Chinese history and mythology. It sought to distinguish between historical and fictional narratives of the characters.

China Youth Daily described the game as "digital opium" and noted several game addiction cases involving Honor of Kings. In Hangzhou, a middle school teacher wrote a widely-disseminated article calling for the game to be banned, attributing negative effects on teenagers' mental health to its influence. Shortly thereafter, a thirteen year-old in Hangzhou jumped off a building because his father prevented him from playing Honor of Kings and the Qianjiang Evening News called for a ban on the game. Southern Metropolis Daily reported that Honor of Kings had not implemented the national system that aimed to protect adolescents from video game addiction.

On 3 and 4 July, People's Daily published a pair of critical articles. On 4 July 2017, it was reported that the game's owner Tencent had suffered a loss of $14 billion, or 4.1%, on the Hong Kong Stock Exchange after People's Daily criticized Honor of Kings as a "poison" for young people, calling the content "a twist of values and historical views" and addictive. Variety described the two critical articles as a "demonstration of the power of China's state-run media and propaganda machine". On 4 July, Honor of Kings implemented measures to limit the amount of time teenagers could spend playing the game. Honor of Kings started limiting children under the age of 12 to one hour of play time per day, with an additional restriction from playing after 9 pm. Children aged from 12 to 17 were limited to two hours per day. It is believed that rising concerns over excessive gaming habits in children led Tencent to self-impose these restrictions. Honor of Kings producer Lin Min stated online that the game's design "fully complied with government requirements" and argued that "just like other forms of entertainment, games can be [a non-addictive] part of our normal daily lives".

After these changes in Honor of Kings, public and media debate about game addiction shifted towards debate about the role of family, school, education, and other factors. Tencent's stock value increased shortly thereafter.

On 31 October 2021, Honor of Kings updated its juvenile addiction prevention system following the requirement from National Press and Publication Administration. Under the new changes, minors can log in to the game only from 20:00 to 21:00 on Friday, Saturday, Sunday, and legal holidays. Although the anti-addiction system is a successful feature, it has somewhat reduced the economic revenue of Honor of Kings.

In 2022, For All Time, a mobile game launched by NetEase, accused Honor of Kings of plagiarizing artwork, while in 2024, Onmyoji, also a mobile game launched by NetEase, posted a letter from its law firm warning that the new skins for the Honor of Kings characters Li Bai and Dasiming constituted copyright infringement and unfair competition. Tencent strongly denied both accusations.

== Reception ==
Reception

Aggregate score
| Aggregator | Score |
|---|---|
| Metacritic | iOS: 78/100 |

Review score
| Publication | Score |
|---|---|
| Pocket Gamer | 4/5 |

Honor of Kings received "generally favourable reviews" according to the review aggregator website Metacritic.
