= Qingqiu =

Place in Chinese mythology and literature

Qingqiu (Chinese: 青丘; pinyin: Qīngqiū; lit. "Azure Hill" or "Green Mound") is a legendary place in Chinese mythology and literature, most famously described in the ancient Chinese mythology compilation Shanhaijing. In early texts, Qingqiu is depicted as a distant land or mountain associated with fox spirits, especially the jiuweihu, or nine-tailed fox.

Throughout Chinese literary history, Qingqiu became a symbolic location associated with fox spirits, depicted sometimes as yaoguai demons and sometimes xian immortals. Qingqiu appears in classical texts, historical records, poetry, and remains a stable setting for Chinese popular culture.

== Etymology ==
The name Qingqiu consists of the characters 青 (qīng), meaning "blue-green", "azure", or "verdant", and 丘 (qiū), meaning "hill" or "mound". The term is commonly interpreted as "Azure Hills" or "Green Hills".

In traditional Chinese cosmology, the color qing could symbolize the east, which corresponds with descriptions in early texts that place Qingqiu in the eastern regions beyond the central Chinese states.

== History ==
=== Early textual references ===
The earliest known description of Qingqiu appears in the Classic of Mountains and Seas (Shanhaijing), compiled between the Warring States period and the Western Han dynasty. The text describes Qingqiu as a mountainous region where jade and blue minerals are found and where strange creatures live.

「青丘之山，其阳多玉，其阴多青雘。有兽焉，其状如狐而九尾，其音如婴儿。」

"The Mountain of Qingqiu—its sunny side is rich in jade and its shaded side in blue minerals. There is a beast there resembling a fox with nine tails, whose cry is like that of an infant."

— Classic of Mountains and Seas

Other early works reference Qingqiu as a distant or mythical land. The Lüshi Chunqiu describes it as a place visited by the legendary ruler Yu the Great during his journeys.

=== In mythology and folklore ===
Qingqiu became strongly associated with fox spirits in Chinese mythology. The jiuweihu described in the Shanhaijing later became a major figure in Chinese folklore and literature. Up until the Tang dynasty, portrayal of the jiuweihu was always as a xiangrui （祥瑞）whose appearance meant auspicious times were coming.

However, later tales portray them negatively and called them hulijing and considered them a type of yaoguai. According to traditional beliefs, fox spirits could cultivate spiritual power and transform into human form. Because the Shanhaijing linked such creatures to Qingqiu, later literature sometimes described the place as the homeland of fox spirits. Most famously, the hulijing are heavily featured in Qing-dynasty work Strange Tales from a Chinese Studio by Pu Songling. These stories portray fox spirits as supernatural demons called hulijing, capable of transformation, wisdom, or seduction, themes that became prominent in Chinese folklore.

=== In classical literature ===
Qingqiu was also used as a poetic or symbolic location in classical Chinese literature. Poets of the Tang dynasty referenced Qingqiu when describing distant lands, mythological geography, or supernatural creatures.

The Tang poet Du Fu mentioned Qingqiu in hunting imagery in his poem Zhuangyou (壮游), describing winter hunts near Qingqiu.

Later writers sometimes used Qingqiu metaphorically to describe remote lands or mythical realms.

== Proposed locations ==
Although Qingqiu is primarily described as a mythical place, theories associate it with real-life locations. There are also many places historically named Qingqiu.

=== Heze ===
One interpretation links Qingqiu to the region around modern Heze in Shandong Province, where there exists remains of a Sui dynasty Qingqiu Temple. The Qingqiu Gudui (青丘堌堆) archaeological site there has revealed Longshan culture dwellings and Shang–Zhou dynasty sacrificial pits, indicating settlement activity dating back roughly four thousand years. The Zuo Zhuan and writing at the temple record gatherings at a place called Qingqiu in this region, while geographical works including the Taiping Huanyu Ji and Yuanhe Junxian Zhi mention fox-related traditions around nearby Lihu (Fox) County.

=== Binzhou ===
Qingqiu is the old name of what is now Binzhou while under the state of Qi. According to the 元和郡县志, “齐景公有马千驷，田于青丘”, indicating that Duke Jing changed the name from Qingqiu to Qiancheng after converting it to fields for raising horses.

== In popular culture ==
The mythological concept of Qingqiu has influenced numerous modern works of fiction, particularly Chinese fantasy stories involving hulijing, jiuweihu, huyao, or the huzu.

In xianxia stories such as Three Lives, Three Worlds, Ten Miles of Peach Blossoms, Eternal Love of Dream and Lost You Forever , Qingqiu is featured as a main setting and the home of the jiuweihu, depicted as xian in each case. The 2016 television series “《青丘狐传说》” (Legend of Nine Tails Fox) directly uses the name Qingqiu (青丘) in its title and story, and features a series of stories about the huzu, fox spirits who live in Qingqiu.

Among ACG subculture, Qingqiu appears as a location in manhua and donghua such as Cang Yuan Tu and Fox Spirit Matchmaker. In games, Qingqiu appears as playable regions or home to jiuweihu-themed characters. The game Honor of Kings has a skin called Qingqiu Jiuwei 青丘·九尾 for its playable character Daji, based on the mythological jiuweihu of the same name. The science‑fiction game Honkai: Star Rail features the Star Qingqiu, referred to as Verdentia in English, as the former home of the foxians in the China-based region of Xianzhou alliance. Playable foxian characters include Jiaoqiu and Feixiao.

== See also ==
- Classic of Mountains and Seas
- Nine-tailed fox
- Huli jing
- Chinese mythology
- Yu the Great
- Xianxia
