= Nine-tailed fox =

East Asian mythical fox entity

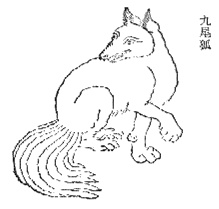
- The nine-tailed fox in the Shanhaijing, depicted in an edition from the Qing dynasty

Chinese name
- Chinese: 九尾狐
- Literal meaning: nine-tailed fox
Transcriptions
Standard Mandarin
- Hanyu Pinyin: jiǔwěihú
- IPA: [tɕjòʊ.mèɪ.xǔ]
Yue: Cantonese
- Yale Romanization: gáuméihwùh
- Jyutping: gau2 mei5 wu4
- IPA: [kɐw˧˥.mej˩˧.wu˩]

Vietnamese name
- Vietnamese alphabet: hồ ly tinh; cáo chín đuôi
- Chữ Hán: 狐狸精
- Chữ Nôm: 𤞺𠃩𡳪

Korean name
- Hangul: 구미호
- Hanja: 九尾狐
Transcriptions
- Revised Romanization: gumiho
- McCune–Reischauer: kumiho

Japanese name
- Kanji: 九尾の狐
Transcriptions
- Romanization: kyūbi no kitsune

Illustration of a Fox Spirit from the Chinese encyclopedia Gujin Tushu Jicheng.

The nine-tailed fox (九尾狐) is a mythical fox entity originating from the mythology of China.

== In Asian literature ==
The first recorded appearance of the nine-tailed fox can be found in the ancient Chinese text, Shanhaijing (Classic of Mountains and Seas), which was compiled sometime between the Warring States period and the early Han dynasty (circa 475 BCE – 141 BCE). The text states: "In the land of Qingqiu, there lives a fox with nine tails."

In Chinese classical texts and the poetic tradition of the Tang Dynasty, “Qingqiu” was originally a mythologized geographical image, often used to refer to distant lands in the east. Tang poets some time used “Qingqiu” as a general reference to eastern states such as Goguryeo and Baekje, or to surrounding regions.Although Qingqiu is more likely a mythological concept created by blending elements of real geography with imagination, the place that likely inspired it is believed to be in the Heze area of Shandong Province.

In Chinese folklores, foxes are depicted as spirits possessed of magic power. These foxes are often depicted as mischievous, usually tricking other people, with the ability to disguise themselves as a beautiful man or woman.

The fox spirit is an especially prolific shapeshifter, known variously as the jiǔwěihú in Mandarin speaking China, and the kumiho in Korea, the kitsune in Japan, and the hồ ly tinh in Vietnam. Although the specifics of the tales vary, these fox spirits can usually shapeshift, often taking the form of beautiful young women who attempt to seduce men, whether for mere mischief or to consume their bodies or spirits.

Describing the transformation and other features of the fox, Guo Pu (276–324) made the following comment:

When a fox is fifty years old, it can transform itself into a woman; when a hundred years old, it becomes a beautiful female, or a spirit medium, or an adult male who has sexual intercourse with women. Such beings are able to know things at more than a thousand miles' distance; they can poison men by sorcery, or possess and bewilder them, so that they lose their memory and knowledge; and when a fox is a thousand years old, it ascends to heaven and becomes a celestial fox.

In other articles, it is said that" “The fox demon from Heaven was incarnated as this woman to bring disaster to the Shang Dynasty.” “Once in human form, fox spirits would take advantage of mortal humans…. However, there are several exceptions to this general rule. Some stories describe fox spirits as having a strong sense of honor.”

The Youyang Zazu made a connection between nine-tailed foxes and the divine:

Among the arts of the Way, there is a specific doctrine of the celestial fox. [The doctrine] says that the celestial fox has nine tails and a golden color. It serves in the Palace of the Sun and Moon and has its own fu (talisman) and a jiao ritual. It can transcend yin and yang.

== In European literature ==
The Brothers Grimm tale titled "The Wedding of Mrs. Fox" (German: Die Hochzeit der Frau Füchsin), remains a unique European example where the nine tails symbolize superficial value and prestige.

== In popular culture ==
Each of the nine-tailed fox appearances are listed in each section in order by year:

=== Games ===
- Tails in Sonic The Hedgehog 2 (1992)
- Ninetales in Pokémon (1996)
- Nine-Tailed Fox, final boss in Otogi 2: Immortal Warriors (2003)
- Ran Yakumo, extra stage boss in Perfect Cherry Blossom (2003)
- Nine-Tailed Fox, a boss in Blood Will Tell (2004)
- Ninetails, a boss in Okami (2006)
- Ahri(아리) in League of Legends (2009)
- Mobile Task Force Epsilon-11 in SCP – Containment Breach (2012)
- Kyubi, Frostail and Darkyubi in Yo-kai Watch (2013)
- Gumiho in Black Desert Online (2016)
- Da Ji in Smite (2017)
- Nine-Tailed Fox, a boss in Nioh (2017)
- Nine Tails, Guardian Spirit in Nioh 2 (2020)
- Yae Miko in Genshin Impact (2020)
- Nine-Tailed Fox, a boss in World of Demons (2021)
- Nine-Tailed Fox, a boss in Getsu Fūma Den: Undying Moon (2022)
- Shichibi and Kyubi, two bosses in Silent Hill f (2025)
- The Kitsune, a boss in Ghost of Yōtei (2025)
- White Fox in Marvel Rivals (2026)
- Hsin in Wuthering Waves (2026)
- Netskie, an enemy in Deltarune Chapter 5 (2026)
- Mio in Fox Flare Night (2026)

=== Literature, graphic novels, comics ===
- Murphy in Maris the Chojo (1980)
- Kurama in YuYu Hakusho (1990)
- Sakura in Hyper Police (1993)
- Kurama in Naruto (1999)
- Kyubimon in Digimon Tamers (2001)
- Nine tails Guardian The God of Highschool (2011)
- Lico in The Demon Girl Next Door (2014)
- Fox Spirit Matchmaker (2015)
- The Helpful Fox Senko-san (2017)
- Shuos Jedao in Machineries of Empire (2016)
- One Hundred Ghost Tales From China and Japan by Tsukioka Yoshitoshi (1865)
- Mobile Task Force Epsilon-11 and SCP-953 in SCP Foundation (2007)
- Kyubi in Blue Exorcist by Kazue Kato (2011)
- Iron Widow by Xiran Jay Zhao (2021)
- [Devon] in [one piece]

=== Film ===
- Painted Skin (2008) and its sequel (2012)
- A Chinese Fairy Tale (2011)
- League of Gods (2016)
- Once Upon a Time (2017)
- Hanson and the Beast (2017)
- The Legend of Hei (2019)
- Jiang Ziyia (2020)
- Soul Snatcher (2020)
- Shang-Chi and the Legend of the Ten Rings (2021), the Jiu Wei Hu is among the creatures residing in Ta Lo
- Umma (2022)

=== TV series ===
- Murphy in Maris the Chojo (1986)
- Sakura in Hyper Police (1997)
- The Legend of Nezha 哪吒传奇 (2003)
- Strange Tales of Liao Zhai 新聊斋志异 (2005)
- The Legend and the Hero (2007) and its sequel (2009)
- My Girlfriend Is a Gumiho (2010)
- Kyubey in Puella Magi Madoka Magica (2011)
- Gu Family Book (2013)
- The Investiture of the Gods (2014) and The Investiture of the Gods 2 (2015)
- Legend of Nine Tails Fox (2016)
- Fox in the Screen 屏里狐 (2016)
- Eternal Love (2017)
- Moonshine and Valentine (2017)
- Beauties in the Closet 柜中美人 (2018)
- Investiture of the Gods (2019)
- Love, Death & Robots Episode 8 (2019)
- The Life of White Fox 白狐的人生 (2019)
- Eternal Love of Dream (2020)
- Kumiho in Lovecraft Country Episode 6 "Meet Me in Daegu" (2020)
- Lee Dong Wook in Tale Of The Nine Tailed (2020)
- My Roommate Is a Gumiho (2021)
- In Kamen Rider Geats (2022), the main character's motif is based on the Nine-tailed fox. Additionally, the main character's final form takes the form of the Nine-tailed fox motif.
- In Sonic Prime (2022–2024), Nine is an alternative version of Tails in another dimension who added seven mechanic tails to his body, making him a nine-tailed fox.
- Unicorn: Warriors Eternal (2023)
- The Mickey Mouse Funhouse episode "HALT, Tiger" features the character Cho Sook (voiced by Jee Young Han), a shapeshifter residing in the Land of Myth and Legend's Shadow Mountain who can turn into a nine-tailed fox.
- Jentry Chau vs The Underworld (2024): A nine-tailed fox spirit comes out of Jentry's portal to Diyu and attacks Ed.
- No Tail to Tell (2026)
- Veil of Shadows (2026)

== See also ==
- Hồ ly tinh
- Huli jing
- Huxian, Fox Immortal
- Inari Ōkami, Japanese kami
- Kitsune
- Kumiho
- Nine-tailed turtle

== General and cited references ==
- Kang, Xiaofei (2006). The Cult of the Fox: Power, Gender, and Popular Religion in Late Imperial and Modern China. New York: Columbia University Press. ISBN 9780231133388.
- Strassberg, Richard E. (2002). A Chinese Bestiary: Strange Creatures from the Guideways Through Mountains and Seas. Berkeley, Cal.: University of California Press. ISBN 0-520-21844-2.
