= Online Game Ethics Committee =

Chinese Communist Party body

- 网络游戏道德委员会
- Formation: December 2018; 7 years ago
- Type: Office
- Headquarters: No. 5 West Chang'an Avenue, Xicheng District, Beijing
- Parent organization: Publicity Department of the Chinese Communist Party

The Online Game Ethics Committee is an advisory and deliberative body established by the Publicity Department of the Chinese Communist Party, responsible for reviewing and assessing the content of online games.

== History ==
On December 28, 2017, the Publicity Department of the CCP Central Committee, the Cyberspace Administration of China, the State Administration of Press, Publication, Radio, Film and Television and other eight ministries and commissions jointly issued the "Opinions on Strictly Regulating the Management of the Online Game Market". The "Opinions" pointed out that "the problem of lack of cultural connotation in China's online games is quite prominent. Some games are of low quality and have vulgar and violent tendencies. Some works distort history, spoof heroes, have deviations in values and touch the bottom line of morality". The "Opinions" require that all regions and departments should centrally regulate and regulate the online game market from six aspects: unifying thoughts and understanding, strengthening supervision and rectification, implementing main responsibilities, strengthening institutional guarantees, strengthening education and guidance, and strengthening supervision and reporting.

On May 30, 2018, the China Youth Research Center and the Publicity and Planning Center of China Education Press jointly hosted the event "Enjoy the Internet Safely, Protect Your Health – The Dangers and Countermeasures of Youth Online Game Addiction". At the meeting, Wang Dalong, Vice Chairman of the Family Education Professional Committee of the Chinese Society of Education, proposed that "the media plays an irreplaceable and important role in preventing teenagers from becoming addicted to online games. An online game ethics committee can be established to investigate, review, evaluate, supervise and govern online games. The committee should be led by the media and involve the government, schools, experts, teachers, parents, students and other parties".

On December 7, 2018, Xinhua News Agency reported that the Online Game Ethics Committee had been established in Beijing. After its establishment, the Online Game Ethics Committee immediately reviewed the first batch of 20 online games with ethical risks. Based on the review results, the online game regulatory authorities instructed the relevant publishing and operating units to carefully revise 11 of the games to eliminate the ethical risks, and decided not to approve 9 of the games.

On December 20, 2018, Feng Shixin, deputy director of the Publishing Bureau of the Publicity Department of the CCP Central Committee, made a speech at the China Game Industry Annual Conference, saying, "The first batch of games submitted for review have been approved and are being issued licenses. However, the backlog of games submitted is very large and it will take time to digest them. I hope everyone will remain patient." At the same time, the leader of the Publishing Bureau of the Publicity Department of the CCP Central Committee also made a statement at the conference on the recent issue of the Online Game Ethics Committee, saying, "The committee does not review all games, nor does it replace all expert reviews. It evaluates games that are controversial, have concentrated public opinion, and are judged to be likely to cause controversy before they are launched. The reason for not publishing the list of these 20 games is to maintain the corporate image. In addition, these 20 games have not yet been launched, so there is no need to publish them. The reason for not publishing the list of committee members is to prevent interference with the work. The committee has a large number of members and the personnel are changing, so the list will not be published."

== Responsibilities and personnel ==
According to Xinhua News Agency, the Online Game Ethics Committee is mainly responsible for "conducting ethical reviews on online game works and related services that may or have generated ethical disputes and public opinion, providing decision-making references for online game management departments, guiding online game companies to consciously abide by social morality and professional ethics, fulfill social responsibilities, promote the combination of legal management and moral governance, and promote the healthy development of the online game industry".

According to Xinhua News Agency, "The Online Game Ethics Committee is composed of experts and scholars from relevant departments and units, as well as universities, professional institutions, news media, industry associations, etc. who study online games and youth issues". The specific composition of the committee has not yet been made public.

== See also ==
- Censorship in China
- Video game addiction in China
