= Video game addiction in China =

Video game addiction is considered an impulse control disorder, analogous to pathological gambling that does not include using intoxicating drugs. In China, as well as other parts of the world, the disorder is considered a problem. In June 2018, the World Health Organization listed "gaming disorder" in the 11th Revision of its International Classification of Diseases. According to its definition, it is characterized by impaired control, prioritizing gaming by giving excessive time to games rather than other activities, lack of other interests in daily activities, and the continuation of gaming despite the negative consequences. China has in place multiple laws attempting to combat video game addiction in minors.

== Potential contributing factors to video game engagement ==
Several game design elements and psychological mechanisms have been studied in relation to sustained video game engagement:

=== Persistent game worlds and content expansion ===
Modern video games frequently employ open-ended structures with downloadable content (DLC) that extends gameplay indefinitely. Massively multiplayer online games (MMOs) like World of Warcraft maintain persistent worlds that evolve independently of individual players.

=== Reward systems and progression mechanics ===
Games often implement:

- Tiered leveling systems with escalating achievement requirements
- Virtual currencies enabling in-game purchases
- Time-limited rewards and daily login bonuses
- Compulsion loop design patterns common in open-world games

=== Social and competitive elements ===
Multiplayer games facilitate social interaction through:

- Cooperative gameplay mechanics in titles like League of Legends
- Global leaderboards and ranked matchmaking systems
- Esports tournaments with monetary prizes

=== Psychological factors ===
Studies suggest emotional investment in game narratives and characters may influence engagement duration. The phenomenon of "Fear of missing out" (FOMO) has been observed in evolving game worlds where progress continues without player participation.

=== Regional considerations ===
A 2023 study of Chinese adolescent psychiatric patients found 40.9% exhibited video game engagement patterns meeting clinical assessment criteria, with comorbidity rates of 23.6% for concurrent social media engagement. Researchers identified significant correlations between engagement patterns and:

- Academic performance pressures
- Individualistic personality traits
- Childhood trauma exposure

The COVID-19 pandemic exacerbated digital engagement trends globally, with one multinational study reporting 36.7% of participants showing increased internet use severity during lockdowns.

== Treatment ==
Treatments may include in-patient intervention programs with a team of mental health professionals who are specialized in combating computer game addiction. Wilderness therapy, which is similar to in-patient treatment, provides treatment in an outdoor setting devoid of any technology or electronic devices. One-on-one counselling with a mental health professional experienced in working with computer game addictions, may be useful. Family therapy entails a therapist looking at the family system and how it interacts with family activities. Computer game addiction books are available that allow an individual to self-treat their issues.

The Chinese government operates several clinics to treat those who overuse online games, chatting and web surfing. Treatment for the patients, most of whom have been forced to attend by parents or government officials, includes various forms of pain including shock therapy. In August 2009, Deng Sanshan was reportedly beaten to death in a correctional facility for video game and Web addiction. Most of the addiction "boot camps" in China are actually extralegal militaristically managed centers, but have remained popular despite growing controversy over their practices.

== Anti-addiction measures ==
In August 2021, China's strict limits on how long minors can play online video games got stricter. Chinese children and teenagers are barred from online gaming on school days, and limited to one hour a day on weekend and holiday evenings.

A new law passed in November 2019 limits children under 18 to less than 90 minutes of playing video games on weekdays and three hours on weekends, with no video game playing allowed between 10 p.m. to 8 a.m. These are set by requiring game publishers to enforce these limits based on user logins. In September 2020, the government implemented its own name-based authentication system to be made available to all companies to uphold these laws.

== Discourse ==
Significant media coverage and public discourse developed in 2017 in relation to the Tencent game, Honor of Kings. China Youth Daily described the game as "digital opium" and noted several game addiction cases involving Honor of Kings. In Hangzhou, a middle school teacher wrote a widely-disseminated article calling for the game to be banned, attributing to it negative effects on teenagers' mental health. Shortly thereafter, a thirteen year-old in Hangzhou jumped off a building because his father prevented him from playing Honor of Kings and the Qianjiang Evening News called for a ban on the game. Southern Metropolis Daily reported that Honor of Kings had not implemented the national system that aimed to protect adolescents from video game addiction.

On 3 July and 4 July, People's Daily published a pair of critical articles, after which Tencent share price dropped significantly. On 4 July, Honor of Kings implemented measures to reduce teenager's time playing the game. Honor of Kings started limiting children under the age of 12 to one hour of play time per day, with an additional restriction from playing after 9pm. Children aged from 12 to 17 were limited to two hours per day. It is believed that rising concerns over excessive gaming habits in children led Tencent to self-impose these restrictions. After these changes in Honor of Kings, public and media debate about game addiction shifted towards debate about the role of family, school, education, and other factors. The value of Tencent stock increased shortly thereafter.

On 31 October 2021, Honor of Kings updated its juvenile addiction prevention system following the requirement from National Press and Publication Administration. Under the new changes, juveniles only can log in to the game from 20:00 to 21:00 on Friday, Saturday, Sunday, and legal holidays.

== See also ==
- Online Game Ethics Committee
