= Hồ ly tinh =

Vietnamese mythological creature

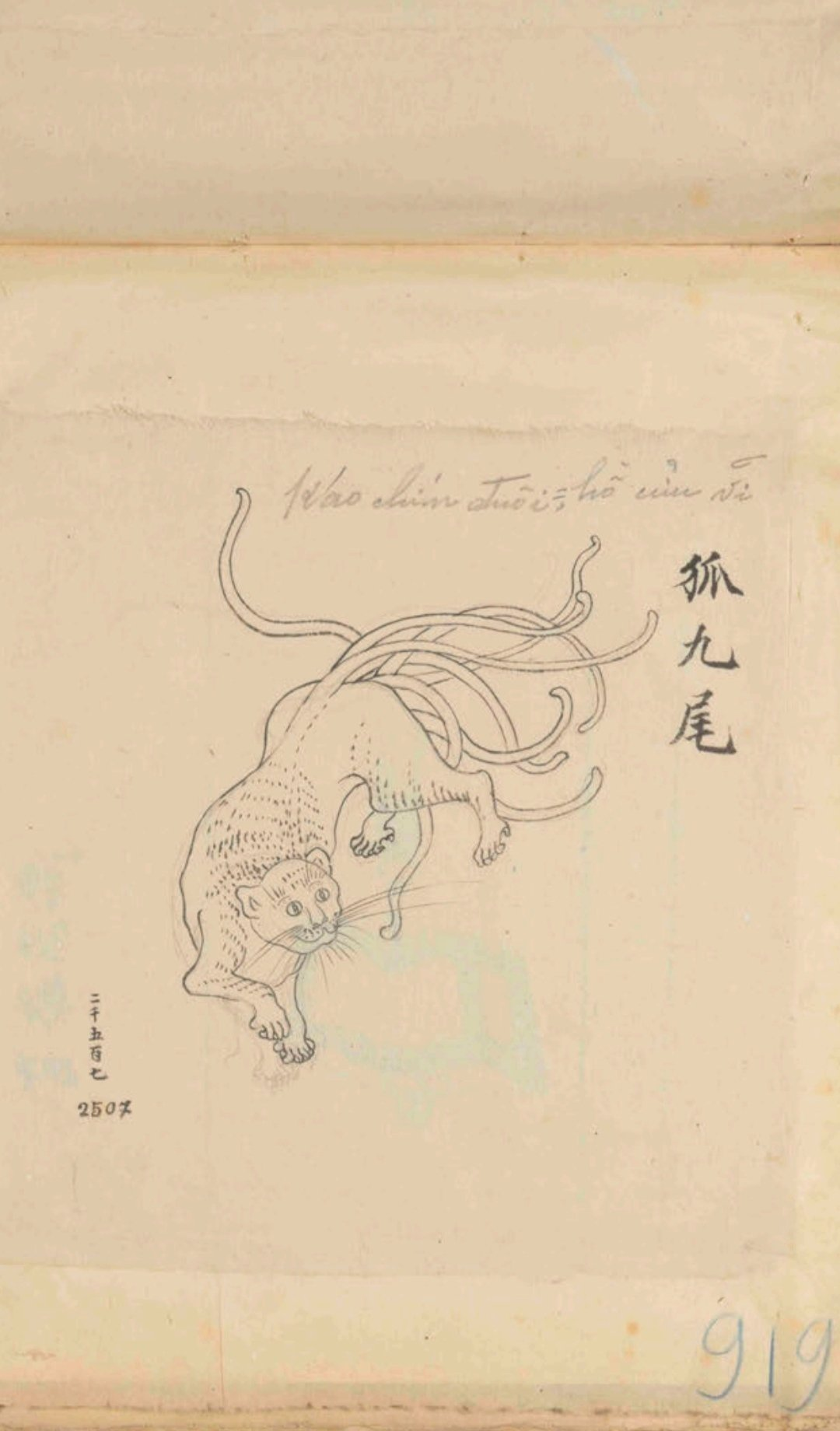
- Cáo chín đuôi in the book Mechanics and Crafts of the People of Annam
- Vietnamese alphabet: Hồ ly tinh Cáo chín đuôi
- Chữ Hán: 狐狸精
- Chữ Nôm: 𤞺𠃩𡳪

Hồ ly tinh (chữ Hán: 狐狸精) also known as Hồ tiên (狐仙), Hồ ly (狐狸), Hồ tinh (狐精), Hồ yêu (狐妖), Yêu hồ (妖狐) or Cáo chín đuôi (chữ Nôm: 𤞺𠃩𡳪), Cáo tinh (𤞺精) is a nine-tailed fox in Vietnamese mythology. They do not have a specific personality; some stories tell about them harming people but along with them are stories about them helping people.

According to a quite famous version, hồ ly tinh are foxes that have the ability to cultivate, to be able to transform, and have magic. If they practice for a hundred years, then they will have three tails and are called Yêu hồ or Tam vĩ yêu hồ (Three-tails demon fox). If they cultivate until after 1,000 years, they change to Lục vĩ ma hồ (Six-tailed ghost fox). And so, when they reach the realm of 9-tails, Cửu vĩ hồ (九尾狐) or Cửu vĩ thiên hồ (Nine-tailed celestial fox), they can turn into humans. Each tail is a life of them. To kill a fox, you must cut off its tail first.

== Folklore ==
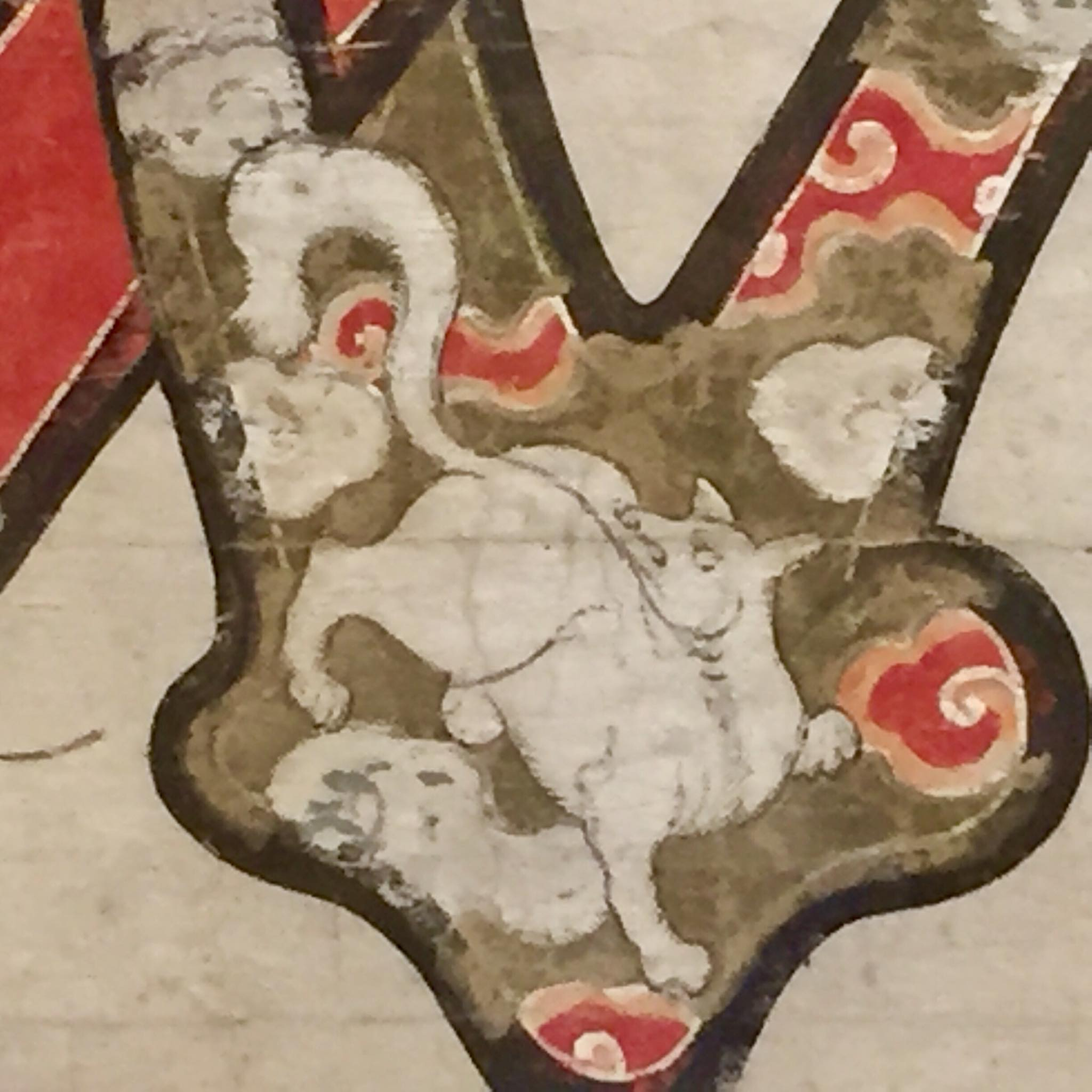
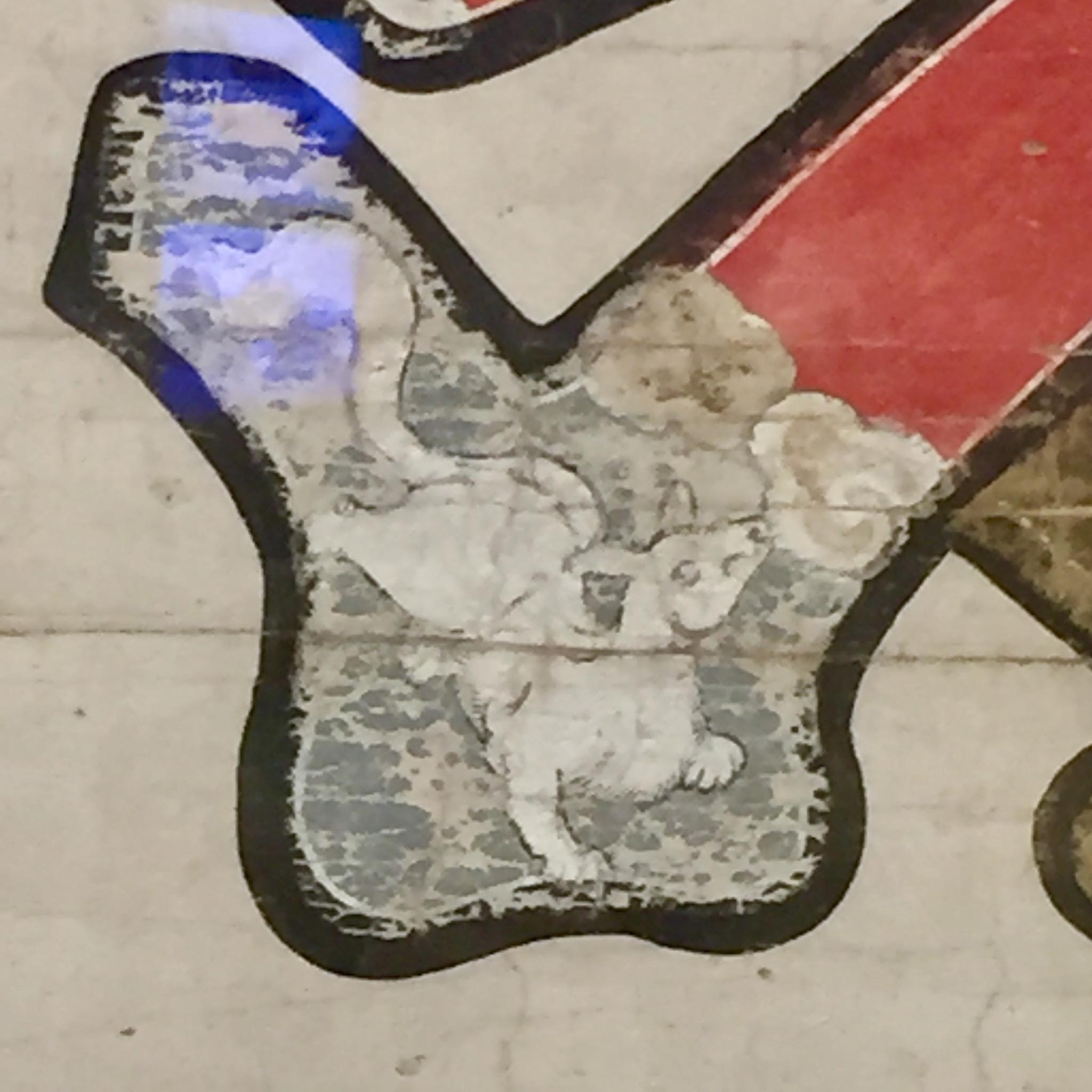
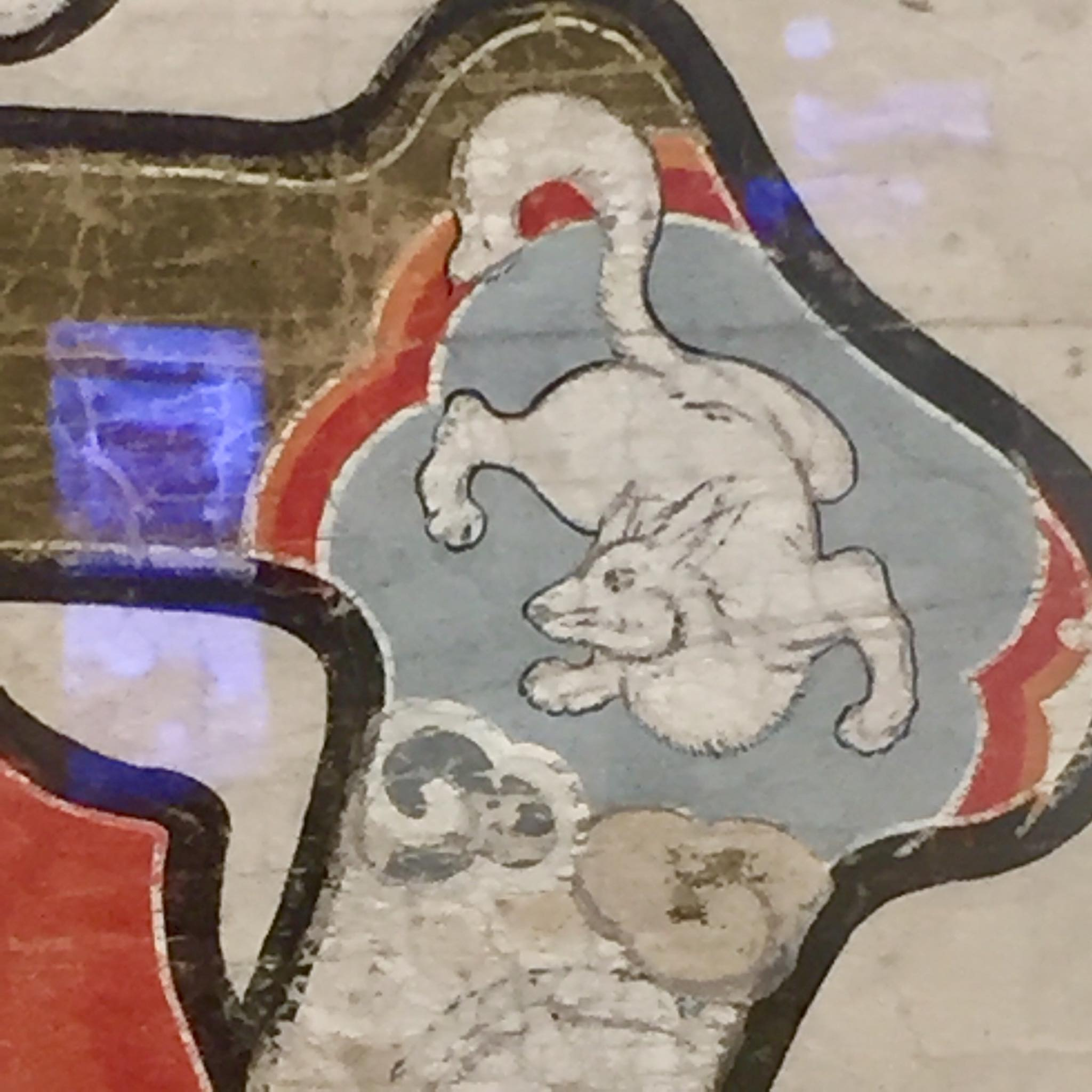
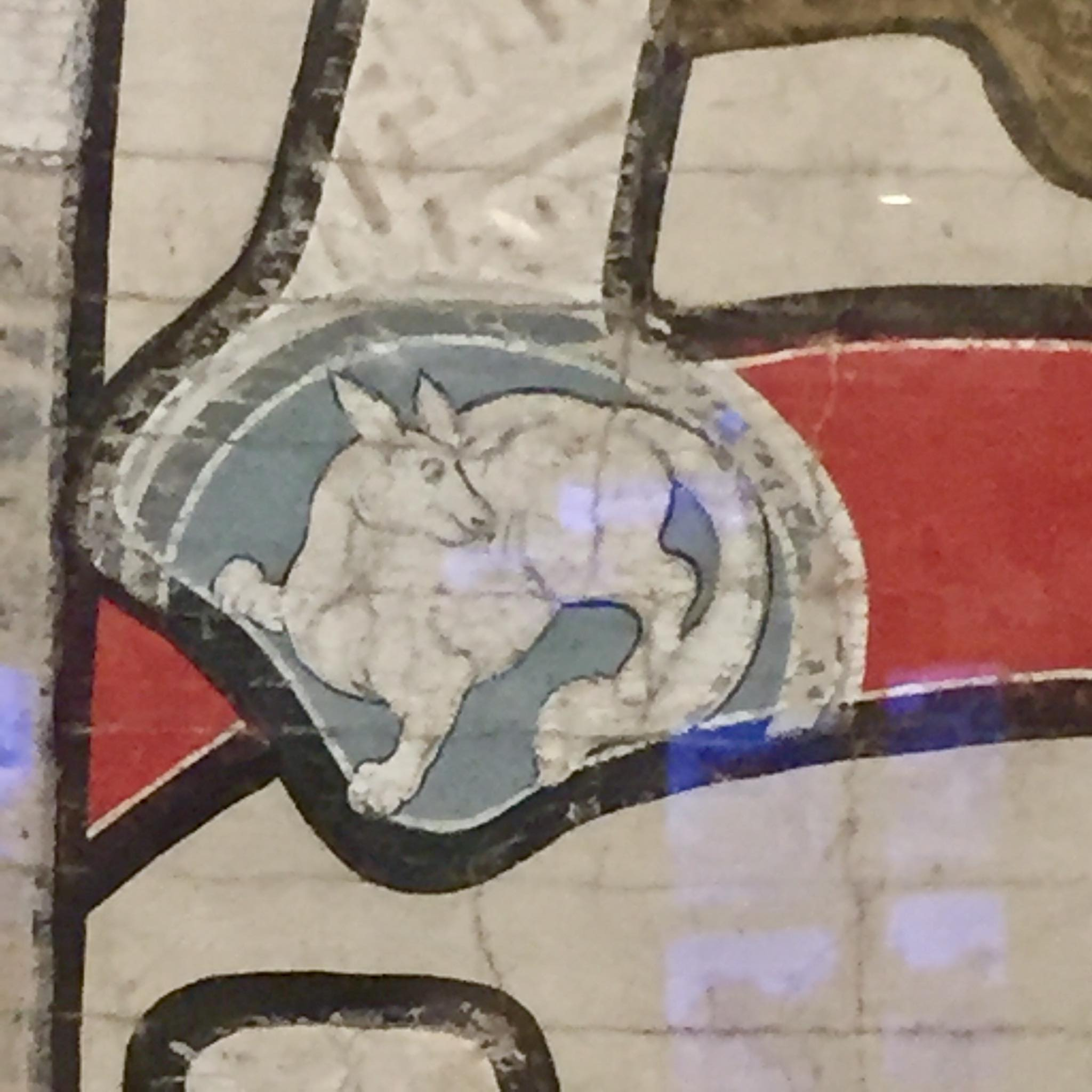
Foxes play with each other in a set of paintings at Độc Lôi Temple

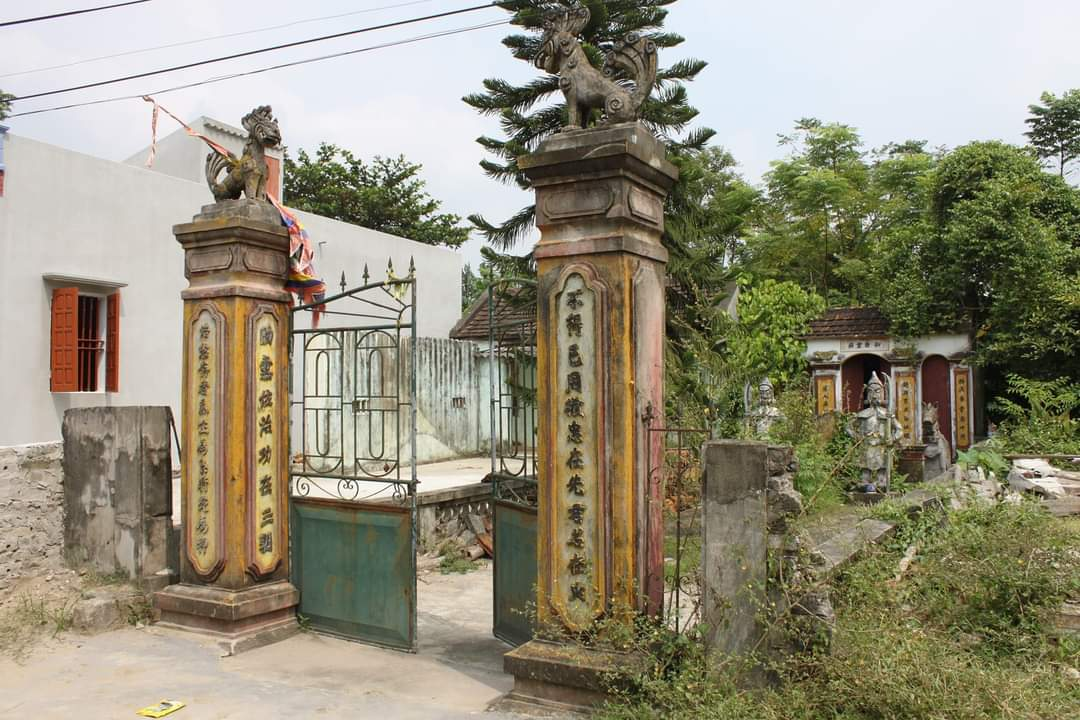
Pair of Cáo chín đuôi statues on the entrance to Lữ Gia temple, Gôi town, Vụ Bản, Nam Định

In the book Lĩnh Nam chích quái, the Hồ ly tinh (or Hồ tinh) is also mentioned with the image of an animal that causes harm to good people, then is killed by Lạc Long Quân to eliminate harm to the people. West Lake is the tomb where the nine-tailed fox is buried. The story goes that:

Thăng Long citadel, formerly known as Long Biên, was uninhabited in ancient times. Lý Thái Tổ rowed a boat at Nhĩ Hà river wharf, two dragons led the boat, so it was named Thăng Long, and then built the capital there. In the past, in the west of the citadel, there was a small rocky mountain, the east pillow up on the Lỗ Giang river. In the cave, at the foot of the mountain, there is a nine-tailed white fox that has lived for more than a thousand years and can transform into a demon, a human, or a demon that travels around the world.

The nine-tailed fox turned into a man in a white shirt and entered the Man's crowd, singing together and luring boys and girls into hiding in a mountain cave. The nine-tailed fox sometimes turns into a beautiful girl, enticing boys, sometimes turns into a handsome young man to flirt with village girl; sometimes it's the devil that scares people... It did so because it wanted to capture as many people as possible and bring it back to the deep cave to eat gradually. Long Quân then ordered the Lục bộ thủy phủ (senior authorities under the water palace) to raise water to attack the cave. The nine-tailed fox ran away, the navy chased after him, broke the den to catch the fox, and devoured it.

This place became a deep pool called Xác Cáo lagoon (Fox Corpses lagoon), which is Tây Hồ today. After establishing the temple, ie Kim Ngưu Tự to suppress the demon. The field in the West Lake is very flat, local people cultivate and do business, now called Hồ Động (Fox cave). The land here is high and dry, people build houses to live in, now called Hồ Thôn (Fox village). The old fox cave, now called Lỗ Khước Thôn.

— Lĩnh Nam chích quái

In Đại Việt sử ký toàn thư, it is recorded that Emperor Lê Thái Tổ was once saved by a hồ ly tinh. It happened when he was hiding from the Ming army in Lam Sơn. He was being pursued closely, when suddenly, he saw a girl in a white dress floating in the river. He buried the girl well and hid again. When the Ming army almost found him, there came a white fox running out of nowhere, causing the Ming army to change direction. Lê Thái Tổ thought that it was the girl who saved him, later he named her the guardian god of the country and made a statue of a girl with half a body of a nine-tailed fox, called Hồ ly phu nhân (狐狸夫人), Hộ quốc phu nhân (護國夫人) or Hộ quốc hồ thần (護國狐神).

At the end of the 18th century, the scholar Phạm Đình Hổ described the statue of Hộ Quốc phu nhân in his work Vũ Trung tùy bút as follows: " ...That statue has a human head and the body of a hồ ly, very beautiful figure, the shape of a young girl, her hair in a bun and brooch."

== Worship ==
In some regions in central and southern Vietnam, people worship the Hồ Ly Cửu Vĩ tiên nương (狐狸九尾仙娘, Nine-tailed fox cultivates to become a tiên) and Phấn Nhĩ Quỷ Vương tiên nương (奮茸鬼王仙娘, Bird ruffled feathers, cultivated to become a king, guarded the demon realm). They are two sisters and are the patron gods of the people.

Legend in the Danang and Khánh Hòa areas says that:

In the past, Xuân Thiều village was a desolate land full of miasma, dense forests, and many wild animals. The first people who came to reclaim this land encountered many dangers, every day had to fight wild animals, raging diseases that made many people sick and dead. The villagers prayed to the gods to help them overcome the difficulties that surrounded them. One night the villagers saw a nine-tailed fox emerge from the cave and a feathered bird flew back from the mountain and transformed into two beautiful women. The two women eliminated wild animals and cured the people of the village. After that no one saw the two women again, since then the village has been peaceful. The villagers believed that it was a goddess who came to earth to help the villagers, so the villagers later built a temple for the two goddesses.

== See also ==
- Huli jing, a similar fox spirit from China
- Kitsune, a similar fox spirit from Japan
- Kumiho, a similar fox spirit from Korea
- Lĩnh Nam chích quái
- Việt điện u linh tập
