= Huli jing =

Chinese mythological creatures

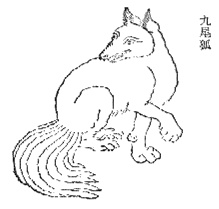

Chinese name
- Chinese: 狐狸精
- Literal meaning: fox spirit
Transcriptions
Standard Mandarin
- Hanyu Pinyin: húlijīng
- IPA: [xǔ li tɕíŋ]
Yue: Cantonese
- Jyutping: wu⁴lei⁴zing¹
Southern Min
- Hokkien POJ: hô͘-lî-chiaⁿ

Vietnamese name
- Vietnamese alphabet: hồ ly tinh
- Chữ Hán: 狐狸精

Korean name
- Hangul: 요호
- Hanja: 妖狐
Transcriptions
- Revised Romanization: yoho
- McCune–Reischauer: yoho

Japanese name
- Kanji: 妖狐
- Hiragana: ようこ
Transcriptions
- Romanization: yōko

Huli jing (Chinese: 狐狸精) or Fox spirits, are Chinese mythological creatures usually capable of shapeshifting, who may either be benevolent or malevolent spirits. In Chinese mythology and folklore, the fox spirit takes a variation of forms with different meanings, powers, characteristics, and shapes, including huxian (狐仙; 'fox immortal'), hushen (狐神; 'fox god'), husheng (狐聖; 'fox saint'), huwang (狐王; 'fox king'), huyao (狐妖; 'fox demon'), huzu (狐族; 'fox clan'), and jiuweihu (九尾狐; 'nine-tailed fox').

Fox spirits and nine-tailed foxes appear frequently in Chinese folklore, literature, and mythology. Depending on the story, the fox spirit's presence may be a good or a bad omen. The motif of nine-tailed foxes from Chinese culture was eventually transmitted and introduced to Japanese, Korean, and Vietnamese cultures.

== Descriptions ==
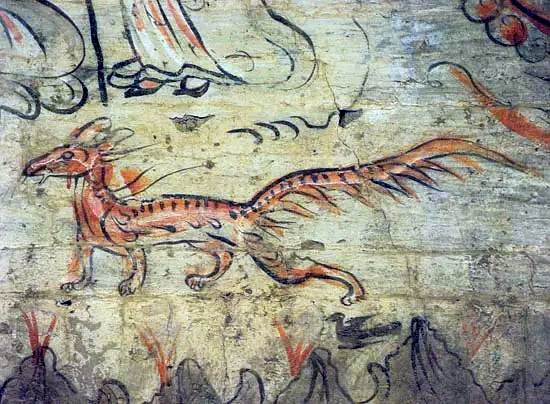
Painting of a fox spirit from Yanju's tomb, Gansu Province. Older depictions of fox spirits depict the eight other tails as branching out from the main tail rather than being separate tails of their own.

The nine-tailed fox appears in the Shanhaijing (Classic of Mountains and Seas), compiled from the Warring States period to the Western Han period (circa fourth to circa first century BC). The work states:

靑丘國在其北其人食五穀衣絲帛其狐四足九尾。
The Land of Blue Hills lies to the north where the inhabitants consume the Five Grains, wear silk and worship foxes that have four legs and nine tails.

— Shanhaijing

In chapter 14 of the Shanhaijing, Guo Pu, a scholar of the Eastern Jin dynasty, had commented that the "nine-tailed fox was an auspicious omen that appeared during times of peace." However, in chapter 1, another aspect of the nine-tailed fox is described:

Three hundred li farther east is Qingqiu Mountain, where much jade can be found on its south slope and green cinnabar on its north. There is a beast here whose form resembles a fox with nine tails. It makes a sound like a baby and is a man-eater. Whoever eats it will be protected against insect-poison (gu).

In one ancient myth, Yu the Great encountered a white nine-tailed fox, which he interpreted as an auspicious sign that he would marry Nüjiao. In Han iconography, the nine-tailed fox is sometimes depicted at Mount Kunlun and along with Xi Wangmu in her role as the goddess of immortality. According to the first-century Baihutong (Debates in the White Tiger Hall), the fox's nine tails symbolize abundant progeny.

During the Han dynasty (202 BC – 9 AD; 25–220 AD), the development of ideas about interspecies transformation had taken place in Chinese culture. The idea that non-human creatures with advancing age could assume human form is presented in works such as the Lunheng by Wang Chong (27–91). As these traditions developed, the fox's capacity for transformation was shaped.

Describing the transformation and other features of the fox, Guo Pu (276–324) made the following comment:

When a fox is fifty years old, it can transform itself into a woman; when a hundred years old, it becomes a beautiful woman, or a spirit medium, or an adult man who has sexual intercourse with women. Such beings are able to know things at more than a thousand miles' distance; they can poison men by sorcery, or possess and bewilder them, so that they lose their memory and knowledge; and when a fox is thousand years old, it ascends to heaven and becomes a celestial fox.

In Duìsúpiān (對俗篇) of the Baopuzi, it is written:

Foxes and dholes both can be eight hundred years of age, and when they are five hundred years old, they become enlightened and are able to take up human form. 狐貍、豺狼皆壽八百歲，滿五百歲，則善變為人形。

In a Tang dynasty story, foxes could become humans by wearing a skull and worshipping the Big Dipper. They would try multiple skulls until they found one that fit without falling off.

Qing Dynasty depiction of the fox spirit.

The Youyang Zazu made a connection between nine-tailed foxes and the divine:

Among the arts of the Way, there is a specific doctrine of the celestial fox. [The doctrine] says that the celestial fox has nine tails and a golden color. It serves in the Palace of the Sun and Moon and has its own fu (talisman) and a jiao ritual. It can transcend yin and yang.

The fox spirits encountered in tales and legends are usually female and appear as young, beautiful women. One of the most infamous fox spirits in Chinese mythology was Daji, who is featured in the Ming Dynasty shenmo novel Fengshen Yanyi. A beautiful daughter of a general, she was forcibly married to the cruel tyrant, Di Xin. A nine-tailed fox spirit who served Nüwa, whom Di Xin had offended, entered into and possessed her body, expelling the true Daji's soul. The spirit, as Daji, and her new husband schemed cruelly and invented many devices of torture, such as forcing righteous officials to hug red-hot metal pillars. Because of such cruelties, many people, including Di Xin's own former generals, revolted and fought against the Shang dynasty. Finally, King Wen of Zhou, one of the vassals of Shang, founded a new dynasty named after his country. The fox spirit in Daji's body was later driven out by Jiang Ziya, the first Prime Minister of the Zhou dynasty, and her spirit condemned by Nüwa herself for excessive cruelty.

== Traditions ==
Popular fox worship during the Tang dynasty has been mentioned in a text entitled Hu Shen (Fox gods):

Since the beginning of the Tang, many commoners have worshiped fox spirits. They make offerings in their bedchambers to beg for their favor. The foxes share people's food and drink. They do not serve a single master. At the time there was a figure of speech saying, "Where there is no fox demon, no village can be established."

In the Song dynasty, fox spirit cults, such as those dedicated to Daji, became outlawed, but their suppression was unsuccessful. For example, in 1111, an imperial edict was issued for the destruction of many spirit shrines within Kaifeng, including those of Daji.

On the eve of the Jurchen invasion, a fox went to the throne of Emperor Huizong of Song. So Huizong ordered the destruction of all fox temples in Kaifeng. The city was invaded the next day, and the dynasty fell after five months.

In late imperial China, during the Ming and Qing dynasties, disruptions in the domestic environment could be attributed to the mischief of fox spirits, which could throw or tear apart objects in a manner similar to a poltergeist. "Hauntings" by foxes were often regarded as both commonplace and essentially harmless, with one seventeenth-century author commenting that "Out of every ten houses in the capital, six or seven have fox demons, but they do no harm and people are used to them".

Typically, fox spirits were seen as dangerous, but some of the stories in the Qing dynasty book Liaozhai Zhiyi by Pu Songling are love stories between a young boy and a fox appearing as a beautiful girl. In the fantasy novel The Three Sui Quash the Demons' Revolt, a huli jing teaches a young girl magic, enabling her to conjure armies with her spells.

Belief in fox spirits has also been implicated as an explanatory factor in the incidence of attacks of koro, a culture-bound syndrome found in southern China and Malaysia in particular.

There is mention of the fox spirit in Chinese Chán Buddhism, when Linji Yixuan compares them to voices that speak of the Dharma, stating "the immature young monks, not understanding this, believe in these fox-spirits..."

Fox spirits were thought to be able to disguise themselves as women. In this guise, they seduced young men who were scholars or merely intelligent to absorb "life essence through their semen". This allowed them to actually turn into humans, then huxian, and then, after 1,000 years, a nine-tailed fox god which was able to navigate through higher realms of tiān.

A handful of Huli jing also appear in Wu Cheng'en's late 16th-century novel, the Journey to the West:

- A brother-sister pair appear in the story arc covering the demon brothers, Golden-Horn and Silver-Horn. They are introduced as the demon brother's venerable mother and maternal uncle, respectively.
- In the story arc covering Princess Iron Fan, it is revealed that Princess Iron Fan's husband, the Bull Demon King, has left her for Princess Jade Countenance, a Huli jing demoness, who lured the Bull Demon King away from Princess Iron Fan with her massive dowry.
- In the story arc concerning Pilgrims; while they are passing through the Kingdom of Biqiu, the White Deer Spirit and his adopted daughter, the White-Faced Vixen Spirit (also a Huli jing demoness), are plaguing the unwitting king, who had married the White-Faced Vixen Spirit while she posed as a mortal woman and the White Deer Spirit as her mortal father; the White-Faced Vixen Spirit is later slain by Zhu Bajie.

The fox cult survived in northern China in the 20th century, but was suppressed during the anti-superstition Socialist Education Campaign.

== See also ==
- Daji, a well-known character who was a fox spirit in the Fengshen Yanyi
- Hồ ly tinh, a similar fox spirit from Vietnam
- Huxian, the fox immortals, highly cultivated fox spirits in Chinese tradition
- Kitsune, the Japanese version
- Kumiho, the Korean version
- Nine-tailed fox, the most well-known fox spirit in Chinese mythology
- Strange Stories from a Chinese Studio, a compilation of supernatural stories of which many have fox spirits as a theme
- Tian, the realm some fox spirits were thought to be able to go to

== Literature ==
- Chan, Leo Tak-hung (1998). The Discourse on Foxes and Ghosts: Ji Yun and Eighteenth-Century Literati Storytelling. Hong Kong: Chinese University of Hong Kong. ISBN 978-962-201-749-8.
- Huntington, Rania (2003). Alien Kind: Foxes and Late Imperial Chinese Narrative. Cambridge: Harvard University Press. ISBN 978-0-674-01094-9.
- Kang, Xiaofei (2006). The Cult of the Fox: Power, Gender, and Popular Religion in Late Imperial and Modern China. New York: Columbia University Press. ISBN 978-0-231-13338-8.
- Strassberg, Richard E. (2002). A Chinese Bestiary: Strange Creatures from the Guideways through Mountains and Seas. Berkeley: University of California Press. ISBN 978-0-520-21844-4.
- Ting, Nai-tung. "A Comparative Study of Three Chinese and North-American Indian Folktale Types." Asian Folklore Studies 44, no. 1 (1985): 42–43. Accessed July 1, 2020. doi:10.2307/1177982.
- Anatole, Alex. "Tao of Celestial Foxes -The Way to Immortality" Volumes I, II, III)(2015)
