= Robert A. Wolf =

American musician

Robert A Wolf (born Oct 6, 1961) is an American electronic musician and independent film composer from Evansville, Indiana. He has been president and CEO of Wolfymusic recording label and Wolfymusic studios. Robert's first film score in 1992 won him second place in the World fest film awards. Other awards include the Miller High Life Rock to Riches compilation record made for WYER radio in Mt. Carmel Il. two years in a row (1982)(1983) And first place in the Ambient category for August 2009 Our Stage.com song contest for his song 'No Horizon' from his 2009 'Krakatoa' album.

Robert's albums Sanctuary(1993), Paradox(1999), and Krakatoa(2009) all released on the Wolfymusic label. Much of Robert's music from his 'Krakatoa' album has been featured on The Weather Channel's Local on the 8's segment.

Robert works extensively with director James Arnett and A.I.A. Motion Picture company in Tucson Arizona. Robert has written and recorded the music score for several of James Arnett's films such as The Tell Tale Heart (1992), Mary Shelley's The Last Man (2008), and Blocked (2011). Robert's work can also be heard in the film Dead on Site(2008), Overcoming Lives Trauma (2011), and Love a La Carte (2012).

== Discography ==
- Sanctuary 1993
- Paradox 1999
- Krakatoa 2009
- Pangea 2015

== Film Scores ==
- The Tell Tale Heart 1992
- Just Another Box 2006
- Mary Shelley's The Last Man 2008
- Dead on Site 2008
- Blocked 2011
- Overcoming Life's Trauma 2011
- Love a La Carte 2012
- Aliens from Uranus 2012
- The Z 2015
