= Qianjiang Evening News =

Simplified Chinese newspaper

- Native name: 钱江晚报
- Type: newspaper
- Language: Chinese
- Website: Official website

Qianjiang Evening News (simplified Chinese: 钱江晚报; traditional Chinese: 錢江晚報; pinyin: Qiánjiāng Wǎnbào) is a Chinese newspaper and is one of the most circulated newspapers in the world.
