= Fox Spirit Matchmaker =

- Also known as: 狐妖小红娘 縁結びの妖狐ちゃん
- Genre: Romantic, Comedy, Fantasy, Supernatural, Historical, Drama
- Created by: Tuo Xiaoxin (Painted); Pansi Daxian (colored)
- Directed by: Wang Xin (王昕), Dong Yi (董易, Vice)
- Country of origin: China
- Original language: Mandarin
- No. of seasons: 12
- No. of episodes: 157 (September 2, 2023)

Production
- Producers: Li Haoling (李豪凌), She Yuanyuan (佘媛媛), Li Xiaoting (李筱婷), Tang Yunkang (唐云康), Niu Xiuyu (牛秀宇), 熊猫盖饭 (Xiongmao Gaifan), askask
- Animators: Haoliners Animation League (Arc 1–8), Garden-Culture (洛水花原)
- Running time: 10–24 minutes per episode
- Production company: Tencent Penguin Pictures

Original release
- Network: Tencent Video, bilibili (Arc 1–5)
- Release: June 26, 2015

Fox Spirit Matchmaker (Chinese: 狐妖小红娘; pinyin: Húyāo Xiǎo Hóngniáng; Japanese: 縁結びの妖狐ちゃん (Emmusubi No Yōko Chan)) is a Chinese romance manhua work painted by Tuo Xiaoxin (庹小新) and colored by Pansi Daxian (盘丝大仙). It was originally published on the magazine Manhua Show (漫画SHOW) since 2012 until the magazine's cancellation but continued on Tencent Animation & Comics. On June 26, 2015, it was animated in Tencent Video. Today it has been broadcast more than 120 episodes. In Tencent Animation 2nd PV competition it passed the group stage and in the final with 35,838 votes to win the first. In July 2018, it was temporarily removed after Bilibili was named and criticised by CCTV. In 2017, it was praised by People's Daily as the first donghua which got high recognition in Chinese state official newspapers.. season 13 has been announced.

== Plot ==
The story centers on the love between humans and spirits. According to classical tales, spirits exist in the world, and some even fall in love with humans. While spirits can live for thousands of years, human lives are short. When humans die, they may be reborn, but they don't remember the love from their past lives. If a spirit is deeply in love, they can seek the help of a fox spirit, who offers a special service that allows the reincarnated human to recall the love they shared in their previous life.

The fox spirit takes on the role of a matchmaker, guiding former lovers back together. This story primarily follows the fox spirit's journey as it helps reconnect past lovers, weaving together a series of intriguing and mysterious tales in the process.

== Main characters ==
Bai Yuechu(白月初, Voiced by Yang Tianxiang(杨天翔))

The protagonist of the story and the fifth reincarnation of Dongfang Yuechu (东方月初). He is obsessed with money and food and he is the fiancé of Tushan Susu. He is a special individual created by Aolaiguo Sanshao(傲来国三少). He has Tushan Honghong(涂山红红)'s spirit power. He was strictly controlled by Yiqi Taoist League(一气道盟), but because of an agreement signed 500 years ago between Tushan and Yiqi Taoist League, he was freed.

Tushan Susu(涂山苏苏, voiced by Liu Xiaoyu(刘校妤))

The supporting character of the story who always carries a variety of snackse because her spirit power is low. She is Tushan Honghong herself because of her loss of spirit power and shrinking, but also because of memory as the cause of reincarnation and forgetting everything. Only blood that has been drunk from Bai Yuechu in certain conditions can be temporarily restored. Bai Yuechu Mister Taoist(道士哥哥) calls her “little fool” (小蠢货).

Tushan Yaya(涂山雅雅, voiced by Zhang Kai(张凯)), elder sister of Tushan Rongrong(涂山容容) and Tushan Susu. She has the strongest spirit power in Tushan and she is the leader of Spirit League.

Tushan Rongrong(涂山容容, voiced by Qiao Shiyu(乔诗语)), the smartest fox spirit and second boss in Tushan.

Wang Fugui(王富贵, voiced by Wei Chao(魏超)), a rich play boy. He is reincarnation of Wangquan Fugui(王权富贵), a member of Yiqi Taoist League.

Bai Qiuen(白裘恩, voiced by Tu Meng Ha Te(图特哈蒙)), father of Bai Yuechu(白月初) and obsessed with money and food. He is currently the team leader of Yiqi Taoist League(一气道盟).

== Animated plot ==
The donghua has several chapters. They are Xiasha Chapter(下沙篇), Wangquan Chapter(王权篇), Yuehong Chapter(月红篇), Beishan Yaodi Chapter(北山妖帝篇), Qianyan Chapter(千颜篇), Nanguo Chapter(南国篇), Zhuye Chapter(竹业篇), Weisheng Chapter(尾生篇), Jinchenxi Chapter(金晨曦篇), Mutiancheng Chapter(沐天城篇) and Liangshenghua Chapter(两生花篇). Each chapter tells a story and they jointly promote the development of the main line plot.

Xiasha Chapter (Arc 1)
Episode: 1–13

OP: Love You Ready, Love Me Ready (Chinese: 爱YOU READY，爱我READY)

ED: Water Flows Eastward (Chinese: 东流, pinyin: Dōngliú)

This chapter mainly tells about the love story about the Fan Yunfei(梵云飞) who is the Prince of Xixiyu(西西域) and Li Xueyang(厉雪扬) whose previous life was called Ice General(冰将军). Fan Yunfei is a sand fox spirit but he isn't afraid of water. He has a stammer. In Li's reincarnation, Fan wanted her to marry him but she refused 99 times. Fortunately, he succeeded. They used Qiannian Yushuizhu(千年御水珠, has amazing power to control water) as their magic item of love continuation.

In modern time, Li is a teacher in a kindergarten. Sometimes Fan will become a dog temporarily because of losing power. Fan and his secretary Yueying Licheng(月映丽城) wanted Bai Yuechu and Tushan Susu could help them achieve love continuation in this life. Bai asked him to touch the half part of Qiannian Yushuizhu and Li had a stomachache immediately when she was watching a movie with Wang Fugui. She was sent to the hospital and another part was picked up from her stomach. Fan and other people arrived at hospital and he expressed his love to her. But she refused. She was reminded of something sad about her reincarnation and became angry. However, Ehuishou (厄喙兽, it destroys love continuation) controlled her. Bai and Susu were roped. Bai wanted to write Kehuofu (克火符, a magic item to generate a flame) on Susu's head. Bai was hurt by Ehuishou and his blood dropped on her head. To his surprise, the fire became more powerful than before and a strange but familiar shadow appeared temporarily. Finally, Li realized the truth and accepted. Fan inherits the throne of Xixiyu in the end.
Wangquan Chapter (Arc 2)
Episode: 14–27

OP: Dreams Come Back (Chinese: 梦回还, pinyin: Mèng Huíhuán)

ED: Water Flows Eastward

This chapter mainly tells about the love story of Wangquan Fugui and a spider spirit names Qingtong(清瞳, the name has meaning about the eyes which can see world clearly). The Wangquan family was the first family to use a magic item to fight against spirits. Wangquan Fugui was the most talented in his family. He could use Wangquan Sword well. His father Wangquan Baye(王权霸业), who was the host of the family, asked him to kill any spirits and could not get out of mansion. But when a spider spirit came to his mansion, he didn't kill her. The spirit knew he couldn't go anywhere so she used her arachnoid to weave paintings which showed beautiful scenery outside of his mansion. Unfortunately, Wangquan Fugui's shimei, Feng Tingyun(风庭云) knew what happened and told everything to Wangquan Baye. Baye asked Fugui to kill the spirit at once, but Fugui didn't follow him and ready to get out of the mansion with the spirit. He was badly wounded in the yard. However, Dongfang Yuechu came here in time and saved him, while Tushan Honghong fighting against 500 guards out of the mansion.

In modern time, Qingtong wanted to find her love continuation man in this life. She knew that Susu had a book called Chunai Tianpian(纯爱天篇, a fox magic book which can tell fox spirits some information about love continuation between spirit and human, each fox spirit has only one book in their whole life. The books in other fox spirits have no name but Chunai Tianpian is the only one which has its name written by Dongfang Yuechu because this book belongs to Tushan Honghong before). When she approached the book, Tushan Yaya came and asked Susu to return the book. Susu refused, so Yaya was angry and wanted to kill Susu. Suddenly, Bai used his tears to stopped her. Wang Fugui and other people came. The book was robbed and Bai used his tears again to stopped them from escaping but unfortunately, the book was cut in half. After that, they came to Tushan. Bai and Tushan Rongrong used all kinds of ways to let Fugui reminded of his reincarnation. Finally, he accepted her love. Yaya and Rongrong wanted to prove that if Susu was Honghong herself. They copied the environment which day Bai used Kehuofu. However, Bai was controlled by Ehuishou and he would fight Yaya with his tears. When he shot his tears, Susu ran in front of him, shot by the tear and disappeared. everyone thought she died except Fugui' grandfather. He calculated the position where Susu would appear. When Bai shot again, Susu appeared, becoming Honghong and kissed him. She helped him recover. Yaya finally believed that Susu was Honghong herself. At that moment, leaves and flowers fell everywhere, people all knew that she who they missed had come back.
Yuehong Chapter (Arc 3)
Episode: 28–48 (including Beishan Yaodi Chapter)

OP: If We Meet in Next Life (Chinese: 若当来世, pinyin: Ruòdāng Láishì)

ED: Bell and Boat (Chinese: 铃舟, pinyin: Língzhōu) Way You Walk (Chinese: 君路, pinyin: Jūnlù, in Beishan Yaodi Chapter)

This is one of the most important chapters. It tells about the love between Dongfang Yuechu and Tushan Honghong. Tushan Honghong was the Queen of Tushan. Dongfang Yuechu came from Dongfang family, whose members could use magic kill-spirit fire, Chunzhi Yangyan(纯质阳炎, means pure sun fire). His parents were killed by Huhe Shuangxian(虎鹤双仙, a two-spirits group) so he ran to Tushan and was saved by Tushan Honghong. After that, Tushan was attacked by Jinmian Huoshen(金面火神, God of fire, real name is Jin Renfeng(金人凤), the host of Shenhuo Mansion(神火山庄)). Jin's Chunzhi Yangyan was so strong that Tushan couldn't fight against him. However, Dongfang Yuechu asked Tushan Honghong to use her hand through his heart and he kissed her immediately. Honghong got strong spirit power from that and finally Jin failed. After the attack. Yuechu used his diluted blood to wash her hands so that she was not afraid of Chunzhi Yangyan. Yuechu loved Honghong so much that he was ready to confess to her on Double Seventh Festival which day that Niulang and Zhinu meet each other every year in Chinese traditional legend. After Tushan Rongrong knew his idea, she told him that Honghong often went to Shuangsheng Mountain(双生峰) on that festival. When Yuechu arrived there, he just saw Honghong walked into an icy cave and sat in front of a dead little Taoist body. Honghong knew he was nearby and said something to him on propose. Then Yuechu knew that she and Rongrong were caught by two Taoists when they were young. But while the elder one sleeping, the little one wanted to save these two fox spirits. Honghong reminded of something that be told by an elder fox spirit, she just thought the little one would kill her so she used her hand through his heart but she understood his real motivation at that moment. The little Taoist told her his thoughts and died soon. Honghong was very guilty and it left a shadow in her heart. She couldn't do what she wanted even couldn't love others. Yuechu was distressed after knowing the fact and left Tushan for fifty years.

In these years, the friendship between human beings and spirits became worse than before. Yuechu experienced something important and became much stronger. He became the host of Yiqi Taoist League. At that time, people still thought Tushan fox spirits often killed people. Only Yuechu and Wangquan Fugui knew the fact: the black fox spirits(黑狐) broke the peace. Yuechu and Fugui talked about how to let people believe the fact. Yuechu pretended to believe black fox spirits' plan and fight Honghong in order to lure black fox spirit to show up. But he knew the end clearly, it is a bet of his whole life. After fighting, the Queen of black fox spirit showed up. Honghong finally realized his real idea and was moved. Yuechu left Tushan 50 years ago just wanted to achieve her dream, a dream about the peace between humans and spirits. Until this moment, Honghong expressed her love to Yuechu and Yuechu got his magic item, Xukong Zhilei(虚空之泪, means the tears of void) because of his guilt. The Queen really wanted to get it, she seriously hurt Yuechu. But the magic item had become Yuechu and Honghong's magic item of love continuation in their heart. The Queen couldn't kill them if she wanted the complete item. Honghong started the love continuation, making a wish that they meet each other in the next life. Dongfang Yuechu was dead and Tushan Honghong lost her spirit power and memory, become Tushan Susu.

In Tushan Theater, people knew what happened 500 years ago in Bai Yuechu's previous life and Tushan Susu. But Tushan was attacked by black fox spirits, Beishan Yaodi(real name is Shi Kuan(石宽)) and Tushan Meimei(涂山美美, a member of black fox spirits). Tushan Susu became Honghong temporarily but was controlled by Meimei. To save her, Bai and Rongrong came into her dream and finally saw Honghong and Dongfang Yuechu's soul. Susu became back. With the help of Bai and Susu's help, Shi Kuan was back to normal and accepted a girl whose reincarnation was the Princess of Yuyao Guo(御妖国) and Shi was her lover in their former life.

All of the spirits in Tushan and people in Yiqi Taoist League wanted Tushan Honghong to come back, so Tushan Yaya asked Bai to marry Susu. At the wedding ceremony. Bai sightly asked Susu whether she wanted to be a real excellent matchmaker or not. Susu was exhausted but finally she expressed her real idea that she didn't want to marry, she just wanted to be an excellent matchmaker. Bai kissed her and she became Honghong. Yaya wanted to catch her but Bai said if she did that he would die again. "If you don't force us to marry right now, I can promise you, I will bring her back, and as she becomes the best matchmaker, I'll woo her, and make her truly fall in love with me."
Qianyan Chapter (Arc 4)
Episode: 49–63

OP: Keep in Mind (Chinese: 铭记, pinyin: Míngjì)

ED: Engrave in the Heart (Chinese: 刻印, pinyin: Kèyìn)

This chapter mainly tells the story of Yan Ruyu(颜如玉) and Lv Jiewen(律笺文). Yan was Tushan Rongrong's only student. She taught him how to transfigure by changing his face. Yan learned it quickly and soon left her. He was a bad guy when he came to humans' life. He often robbed food, killed people and even lured young girls to sleep with him by changing his handsome face. Soon a new captor officer, Lv, came. Lv wanted to catch him. Yan liked to find girls but he don't know why he was appealed deeply. Yan found himself that whatever he did, Lv always respond to catch him. He was sad and asked his master Rongrong about it. Rongrong had guessed that he fell in love with a girl, so he told him his mistakes he made and some basis among humans. He was determined to change himself. After that, some bad spirits escaped from Huntiandian Prison(混天典狱, a prison built by Yiqi Taoist League). Lv and other captors had task to catch them. When they met difficulty, Yan came to help them. Although he helped them, Lv still insisted on catching him just for he was a criminal. When Yan was sent to Huntiandian Prison, Lv came, asked him some questions and left. However, Yan was surprised that his magic item was shining light. He realized her meaning immediately. The answer he replied was a sentence for promise of love continuation. He was so happy to know that Lv loved him. But black fox spirits found him and told that humans' life was short and if he willed and believed them, Lv could forget her pain. Soon Yan escaped but didn't know what to do next. He could only remember something but not clearly. He sat at the top of a snow mountain, seeing Lv built house, married, became old and died.

In modern times, Lv is an actress and she wanted Yan to help her in a performance. But they unfortunately met the bad spirits again and Lv was caught away. Yan came to save her and he let her go away because he didn't want her to know the real him. When the moon became round, he would lose his spirit power and showed the real him. They were found but Bai and Susu came there. They helped Yan and Lv fight bad spirits. Finally, Yan and Lv knew the truth and remembered anything about love continuation.
Nanguo Chapter (Arc 5)
Episode: 64–89

OP: Sentient Beings (Chinese: 众生, pinyin: Zhòngshēng)

ED: Maze (Chinese: 迷阵, pinyin: Mízhèn)

This chapter mainly tells the story of Pingqiu Yuechu(平丘月初) and Huandu Luolan(欢都落兰). Pingqiu Yuechu was the first reincarnation of Dongfang Yuechu. When he was young, he was told that he was a reincarnation of a big hero and was sent to Tushan. Tushan treated him well and he also stuck to practicing his powers. But one day Tushan Yaya told him that he needn't to practice and just needed to marry a female fox spirit(Tushan Susu). He knew that Tushan treated him well just because he was the reincarnation of Dongfang Yuechu. He didn't like her and ran out of Tushan with the help of Aolaiguo Sanshao. Sanshao taught him how to use Xukong Zhilei and found that he could control it well. When Pingqiu ran on his way, he saved a girl, Huandu Luolan, the Princess of Nanguo. Luolan had five guards but they couldn't help her. Pingqiu could save her without being discovered. Luolan was grateful to him. She thought he must have deep power but found he was just a normal man. She was so angry that she decided to help him practice. However, during that period, some spirits who wanted to overthrow the reign of the Huandu Family, knowing that the spirit power of Nanguo emperor, Huandu Qingtian(欢都擎天), will become lower than before. The childe of Nanguo was regarded as the leader of the uprising. Pingqiu helped Luolan to fight against them with his Xukong Zhilei, but the childe knew his magic item and used it to hurt his eyes. Suddenly, Yaya and Rongrong came there. Yaya found the information of the love continuation about Dongfang and Honghong was disappeared in her fox magic book and she couldn't believe it. Rongrong asked Pingqiu some details about him and she helped them solve the uprising. After that, Luolan wanted to make the love continuation with Pingqiu but was refused by Yaya. When they came back to a hotel, the soul of Dongfang Yuechu temporarily awakened from Pingqiu's body and told her she could do that. Luolan tried but was refused again. At that moment, Tushan Honghong, with Susu's shape, appearing in front of them. She permitted that they could. Luolan made her wish for a few days near Pingqiu's body but he was not awake.

Later, Luolan gave Bai Yuechu food for seven days and Bai became a little chicken. She wanted to use this method to get Bai's soul so that she could bring Pingqiu back to life. Susu and her friends finally found Luolan's cave and wanted to save Bai, but the emperor Qingtian prevented them. Susu took out a brochure written by Bai which can help her in danger. She turned it to the last page and bit it, becoming Honghong temporarily. But this Honghong was different from before. When they saved Bai and Bai turned normal, Luolan caught his soul again and started to bring Pingqiu back to life. However, Bai wasn't dead, everyone was amazed that he had too many souls. The emperor knew that Luolan made friends with the black fox spirits and she had already prepared to use her life to bring Pingqiu back. Finally, Bai's father, Bai Qiu'en(白裘恩) caught the black fox spirits and everything became normal.

However, Sanshao had a communication with the soul of Dongfang Yuechu outside of the cave. Sanshao "created" Bai Yuechu in order to bring Dongfang back to life. Dongfang's love continuation may have some problems, each reincarnation of him was not his real soul. His soul was divided in each reincarnation and the real one became a kind of subconscious. Sanshao collected all the souls and put them into Bai's body. And if Dongfang was brought back to life, Bai would die. After that, Sanshao met Bai Qiu'en, and Qiu'en insisted on Tushan's love continuation method but Sanshao preferred to keep the whole of Dongfang. Sanshao called Qiu'en "predecessors" and went away.

Zhuye Chapter (Arc 6)
Episode: 90–101

OP: Flowers Fill Yard (Chinese: 满庭芳, pinyin: Mǎntíngfāng)

ED: Entrust (Chinese: 寄, pinyin: Jì)

On a rainy night, Dongfang Huaizhu(东方淮竹) and her younger sister Dongfang Qinlan(东方秦兰) lived at a small hotel. Unfortunately, this hotel was attacked by some bad spirits and Qinlan was stolen. When Huaizhu woke up from a coma, she met a young man with a mask. This young man knew that she came from Dongfang family and could use Chunzhi Yangyan. He used his sword to cut a trace of her hair and prepared to save some people who were caught to do hard work. Huaizhu wanted to follow him and he permitted. They arrived at a spirits' construction site, saved Qinlan and other people. But soon they met the emperor of Nanguo, Huandu Qingtian. The young man and his friends who also wore a mask, fought against the emperor and ran away smoothly. After that, a student of Shenhuo Mansion, Jin Renfeng came and prevented the young man from approaching Huaizhu and Qinlan. When he knew the man had ever saved these two girls, he just apologized but warned him not to approach them. However, after experiencing these events, Huaizhu and the young man started feeling good to each other. They often dated at a bamboo pavilion by the stream and took a boat together. But Huaizhu thought his mask was ugly so she made a new one by herself. Huaizhu often took her bamboo flute but she didn't know how to sing. The young man didn't mind that and soon he said he would left for a long time. The young man gave his scabbard to her and went away. However, Jin Renfeng did eager to get real Chunzhi Yangyan. He cheated a young leech spirit and she told him how to change blood. So Jin secretly went into the host of Shenhuo Mansion's house and changed his blood with the host's blood. Jin got strong power and could use Chunzhi Yangyan. When Huaizhu knew the event, she asked Qinlan to run away and never came back to meet her.

The young man and his mask friends prepared to go out of the round. Thousands of years ago, to protect people and spirits, Aolaiguo Sanshao "Painted" a round so the out-round creatures couldn't hurt in-round creatures. The mask organization arrived at out-round. But they overestimated themselves, they couldn't fight against out-round creatures. Only the young man and one of his friends survived. He was sorrowful and lost his sword heart.

Huaizhu wondered why the young man didn't came back. But Jin wanted to marry her. He and his crews surrounded her and Huaizhu was hurt. However, the housekeeper of Wangquan Mansion, Mr. Fei(费先生) came and had a communication with him. Suddenly, a young man with tattered clothes broke the gate of Shenhuo Mansion and walked near Huaizhu. Mr. Fei announced that the young man, Wangquan Baye, became the host of Wangquan Family. And he told Jin that Baye would marry the girl as a concubine. Although Huaizhu was a concubine, her status in Wangquan Family was similar to a wife. Baye knew that the power of human beings were becoming lower and spirits were stronger. Huaizhu came up with an idea, she willed to have a baby, she and Baye could pass on their power to this baby, so the baby would have the strongest power. But when she gave birth to the baby, something bad happened. She was in a coma for a while. Baye was worried. She told him that she had ever wanted to kill Jin to avenge her father but failed, Jin badly hurt her. Huaizhu finally told Baye that he should insist on finding his sword heart and bring up their child. Soon Huaizhu was dead. The child, Wangquan Fugui, and few time later, Qinlan gave birth to a baby, Dongfang Yuechu.

Many years later, Dongfang Yuechu borrowed Wangquan Sword from Wangquan Mansion. He soon caught a black fox spirit. When Baye and his friend who also survived from out-round saw it, they was so excited that they wrote down a book called Quanwai Jing(圈外经, out-round scriptures) for few days. Baye told Feng Tingyun that she took this book to the edge of the round and changed her family name as Quan, so the hinterland was Wang family and the edge was Quan family. Wangquan Baye lay on the bed, holding scabbard and bamboo flute, saying to himself: "Huaizhu, I can finally with sword heart to meet you".
Weisheng Chapter (Arc 7)
Episode: 102–111

OP: I Still Remember (Chinese: 我还记得, pinyin: Wǒ hái jìdé)

ED: Secret of Forest (Chinese: 森林的秘密, pinyin: Sēnlín De Mìmì)

In original manhua work, this chapter is after Xiasha Chapter and before Wangquan Chapter. The function of this chapter is to relieve from the sadness of Zhuye Chapter and lead something about out-round chapters.

In ancient times, human beings always cut down trees and it caused bad damage. Yueti Family, whose responsibilities are to protect forests. One day, the mother of a young girl asked her to prevent people from cutting down trees. The girl, Yueti Xia(月啼暇) was so shy that her mother was angry. People felt that they would be in danger and ran away. But one of them, Weisheng(尾生) thought Xia would also be in danger, so he held her and ran away. But he fell into a river. He was saved by Xia's protector, a donkey called Azhu(阿柱). Azhu used artificial respiration to save him. When he woke up, He thought that Xia saved him. He was so excited and started to woo her. However, Xia's mother refused him because he was poor. In the end, Yueti Family permitted that Xia could make love continuation with Weisheng but they couldn't meet each other again in this life. Weisheng didn't give up and waited Xia for several days. One day Azhu gave him a letter written down by Xia. Xia told him that she could meet him under a bridge. That was a rainy day, Weisheng waited for Xia a long time. Suddenly, The rain was heavier and flood would wash him away. Weisheng held a tree pillar but the flood was so fast that he was washed away and dead.

In modern time, the reincarnation of Weisheng, Hu Weisheng(胡尾生) was Bai Yuechu's friend. Yueti Xia asked Bai and Susu for help. With the help of them, Hu remembered something about his preexistence. But he just knew Xia didn't came to meet him on that day and he was dead under the bridge. Hu was angry and refused Xia. Bai and them came into Xia's memory. In Xia's memory, Xia knew that the host of Mutian City(沐天城) could help each god spirits bring someone back to life. She wasn't afraid of danger and arrived there. However, it was a scam, the host wanted to get their spirits power. At that time, Fan Yunfei came and helped Xia fight against the host. But they met a man with black clothes. Fan killed the man. Suddenly, the soul came back to his body and he was brought back to life. They felt amazed. Finally, they ran away. Hu was moved for Xia's motivation. After that, Hu knew that Yueti family members would become a tree when they meet rainy days. The spirit power came back to Xia from Hu and they finally lived together.

But Bai was puzzled why the man could be brought back to life and why he has too many souls. Soon he and Susu met the host of Quan Family. The host wanted to check if he was the real reincarnation of Dongfang Yuechu and if he had ability to catch black fox spirits. She gave him a task to catch the black fox spirit which stayed in Cuiyu Minluan(翠云鸣鸾)'s body, who is the younger sister of the best spirit doctor, Cuiyu Ling(翠玉灵). And she asked her student Yang Mie(杨蔑) to train Wang Fugui. In the communication, Bai Yuechu knew that Yang Mie was the reincarnation of Mu Mie(木蔑) and Mu had ever made love continuation with Minluan. But Minluan was sad and prepared to sign a contract of "never meet in this life". Wang couldn't fight against Yang Mie. Bai overestimated himself and failed, too. Yang told him that also he had ability, he couldn't show them out. Bai was disappointed. He reminded of some words that Rongrong told him. Bai willed to be trained in Yi Qi Taoist League methods and wanted to be much stronger.
Jinchenxi Chapter (Arc 8)
Episode: 112–121

OP: Come to Nothing (Chinese: 落空, pinyin: Luòkōng)

ED: Love Not Change (Chinese: 不易不移, pinyin: Bú Yì Bù Yí)

Bai Yuechu and his friends came to a flying ship which was the Quan Family's out-round creatures laboratory. Bai met another personality of Cuiyu Minluan who was confined. But when Yang Mie met her, he felt too painful and released her. Minluan destroyed the lab but was caught. Everyone wanted to know what happened in their memory of the previous life. Bai and Tushan Susu tried to find the fact but was forbidden to come into their memory by Aolaiguo Sanshao for their abilities were not enough. What surprised everyone was that two black fox spirits came out from Yang and Minluan's body. one of them was a special individual which could not be controlled by the Queen of black fox spirit. This black fox spirit admitted that the Queen stole half of Xukong Zhilei from Dongfang Yuechu and four in ten spirit power from Yan Ruyu. She got a special out-round creature called Jinchenxi from Beishan War hundreds of years ago. She used this creature to infect Bai in order to get the spirit power from Tushan Honghong. The host of the Quan Family used magic items to prevent out-round creatures from arriving inland, but she was also infected unfortunately. Bai and his friends ran away from the flying ship. However, the magic items were so great that they couldn't ask Tushan for help. Soon they met a Taoist who was infected by a kind of out-round creature called Tianjiao(天骄). Bai and his friends fought against it and won. But Bai's mistake made Tianjiao summoned Jinchenxi and infected Bai, Susu and Huandu Luolan. They were all controlled by Jinchenxi. Wang Fugui and the host's daughter came into Bai's inner world to try to save him.

In Bai's inner world, he was painful, and he knew his origin was from Dongfang Yuechu and the power was from Tushan Honghong. He thought that everyone wanted him to die so that Dongfang Yuechu could be brought back to life. Everyone regarded Susu as Honghong but he didn't. He wanted to help Susu to achieve her dream that became the best fox spirit matchmaker, but he thought he couldn't help her. Suddenly, Susu came and said that although she was a little fool, and that she knew that she would become Honghong one day. but she could live as "Susu" with Bai. Bai was moved deeply and became normal.

After that, Bai and Susu came into Yang and Minluan's previous memory successfully. In the memory, Yang's previous life, Mu Mie, met a female spirit, He asked her the way to Baiyu Village(白玉村). The spirit told him. Mu soon met the guard of the village. The guards told him some spirits have killed many villagers and hoped that he could help them. But Mu thought that spirit was not seem to be bad. Soon Dongfang Yuechu and Tushan Yaya came.
Mutiancheng Chapter (Arc 9)
Episode: 122–133

OP: Golden (Chinese: 金色, pinyin: Jīnsè)

ED: Never Disconnect (Chinese: 未断, pinyin: Wèiduàn)

Many hundreds of years ago, a lady of the Yang Family, married a young man. When the wedding ceremony was going on, some people broke in and took the young man away just because the man had saved a spirit's life. In the end, the man died as a result of the punishment. The lady couldn't understand why he had to die so badly. She left Yang Family and soon gave birth to a boy called Mu Mie. A night after few years, the little Mu met his elder brother, Yang Yitan(杨一叹), and Yang helped Mu to opened his sky eye. At the same time, Yang's friends helped Mu to practice his power. But soon Mu never saw them again. After his mother died, Mu wondered why they never came, so he decided to find the answer. When he passed by Baiyu Village, he met the guard and knew the spirits here often killed villagers. However, when the guard that knew he met Cuiyu Minluan and didn't killed her, he immediately fought against Mu but failed because of Dongfang Yuechu and Tushan Yaya's obstruction. Minluan told Mu that she had ever been soaked in the strange liquid and it caused she had two characteristics. Yuechu and his friends noticed that villagers here were very strange, and that villagers could control spirits. They wanted to investigate. But what shocked them was that the spirits killed all of the villagers. They knew through Beishan Jiye(北山鸡爷)'s questioning that it all had to do with Mutian City. The host of the city promised that he could resurrected someone which the spirits wanted, but the number was limited. So Mu Mie and others came to the city.

In Mutian City, many spirits didn't believe he had the power to resurrect. Jiye killed him, but a golden liquid flowed into his body and he was resurrected. Spirits believed him and fought against each other for the limited number. At this time, the host and the vice host began their plan. They control these spirits, however, Cuiyu Minluan and the Jidi Samowang(极地萨摩王) were not been controlled. Samowang took Mu Mie to escape from the city. Mu didn't want to left Minluan in the city, so he came back but was blocked. Soon some members of Yiqi Taoist League came. They found that the vice host was Xiao Tianhao(肖天昊) and he told them he was feeding an out-round creature under the city called Jinchenxi, in order to know the fact of the world. The members launched Tianmenzhou(天门咒) to surround the whole city and moved the city to the border of Beishan. As long as the city crossed the border, Jinshenxi would die. But some members were controlled by the hosts, only Mr. Fei, the housekeeper of Wangquan Mansion, was not been controlled. At the same time, Wangquan Baye and other two members of Yiqi Taoist League, helped them to move the city smoothly. Cuiyu Ling(翠玉灵), the elder sister of Cuiyu Minluan, and Tushan Honghong followed. When the city was almost moved to the border, Beishan Yaodi appeared.

Bai Yuechu and Tushan Susu saw everything with the god's perspective and felt well, because they were in Yang Mie's previous life memory and thought that was just history. According to the records of Yiqi Taoist League, Beishan Yaodi killed Jinchenxi in three punches. But they were shocked, the vice host prevented that and it was not in keeping with historical records. Bai realized that he met a real higher-order task, the memory of Yang Mie's previous life was tampered.
Liangshenghua Chapter (Arc 10)
Episode: 134–145

OP: Fight the Fire (Chinese: 扑火, pinyin: Pūhuǒ)

ED: Left and Right (Chinese: 左右, pinyin: Zuǒyòu)

== Broadcast ==
The Japanese language was broadcast on Tokyo MX from July 1, 2017, to December 16, 2017. The content was adapted from Chinese. But it had only 24 episodes and the plot ended with Beishan Yaodi Chapter.

Since Zhuye Chapter, the broadcasting rights only belong to Tencent Video.

== Comic book ==
The original work is the comic published on Tencent Animation & Comics. In May 2016, the work was published as tankōbon books based on the comics. The name of the series of books is Under the Acacia Tree (Chinese: 相思树下, pinyin: Xiāngsīshù Xià).

== Network movie ==
On December 4, 2020, Fox Spirit Matchmaker official Weibo released its first movie post and PV called Yuehong II (Chinese: 月红贰).

On August 14, 2021, Fox Spirit Matchmaker Yuehong II network movie was broadcast on Tencent Video.

== TV series ==
Tushan Matchmaker TV series poster

In 2020 June, Tencent Pictures, IQIYI and Stellar Media(恒星引力) announced that Fox Spirit Matchmaker would be turned into a TV series called Tushan Matchmaker(涂山小红娘, Tushan Xiao Hongniang). The TV series will be presented by Wangquan chapter and Yuehong chapter. However, some animation fans thought this would change their inherent awareness and attitude about animation characteristics.. Season 13 has been announced.

== Mobile game ==
Fox Spirit Matchmaker Mobile Game
- Developer: Tencent Game Aurora Studios
- Publisher: Tencent Games
- Producer: Zhang Jingxuan (张敬轩)
- Engine: Unity3D
- Platform: PC iOS Android
- Genre: MMORPG

At UP2018 Tencent New Creative Ecology Conference on April 23, 2018, Tencent announced that they would develop a game of the same name. The game was operated by Tencent Game Aurora Studios and tested publicly in November 2019. It uses Unity3D as its engine and game type is MMORPG with traditional Chinese style. Players will play through the God's-eye view and help Tushan Susu complete the missions. It allows players to truly get involved in the game and feel the charm of gaming without abruptness.

Currently available for PC, iOS, and Android.

== Influence and events ==
When Fox Spirit Matchmaker appeared, it has had a lot of impact, there have high clicks on many major platforms. To enrich Chinese culture industry and improve cultural travel level, Tencent has carried out many multi-faceted cooperation.

In December 2018, Hangzhou Animation Bus officially joined hands with Tencent Animation to launch No.51 "pure love bus". The main character Tushan Susu, was awarded the "animation public transport image messenger" official status. In May 2019, the "Fox Spirit Matchmaker" large-scale pure love parade series of activities opened in Hangzhou.

On September 16, 2019, Hangzhou Lin'an District Government, Tencent Animation, Hangzhou Hongyi Investment Group Co., Ltd. held a signing ceremony in Hangzhou, announced that in Hangzhou Lin'an District Heqiao ancient town and Liuxi river area, with the "Fox Spirit Matchmaker" as the core, the three parties jointly build China's first National manhua theme tourist attractions, the total project projection area of more than 6 square kilometers. The project plans to restore the scenes and characters in the original Fox Spirit Matchmaker through large-scale real-life construction. This scenic spot appeared digitally in the 16th China International Comics and Animation Festival in 2020.

In the second half of 2019, Tencent created a "Red Line Inn" live experience area with the theme of "pure love" in Yulong Snow Mountain, Lijiang, Yunnan Province. Tushan Susu was also awarded the title of "Lijiang City Smart Arts and Animation Ambassador" by Lijiang City Culture and Tourism Bureau.

In July 2020, Fox Spirit Matchmaker and other donghua were shown as a live dubbing show for scenes in Shanghai International Film Festival.

In 2021, Fox Spirit Matchmaker organized a trip called "linking traditional culture" to Shandong, Jiangsu, Zhejiang, Anhui, Yunnan and other destinations to explore the origin of some Chinese classics and legends, such as the Legend of the White Snake, Butterfly Lovers, The Cowherd and the Weaver Girl and Tian Xian Pei with China Digital Culture Group Co., Ltd. and Culture & Tourism China.

== Award records ==
- China International Comics Festival Golden Dragon Award "2017 Best Comics".
- 2017 ACG Fengshen Shengdian Won "Most Fan Appeal 2D Animation Works".
- China's game list "Popular Comics of the Year" award.
- The 3rd Golden Number Entertainment Award and 2018 Outstanding Works of China's Entertainment Industry.
- 2018 China Entertainment Industry Best Original Works Award.
- 2018 China's entertainment industry the second "Stars share virtual stars fashion festival" Tushan Susu won the China Virtual Idol Glamour Award for best original works.
- 2018 Outstanding Original Work Award.
