= Steamed eggs =

Steamed eggs may refer to:

- Poached egg
- Chinese steamed eggs, a Chinese dish
- Gyeran-jjim, a Korean dish
- Chawanmushi, a Japanese dish
