= Hee pan =

Chinese steamed rice cake

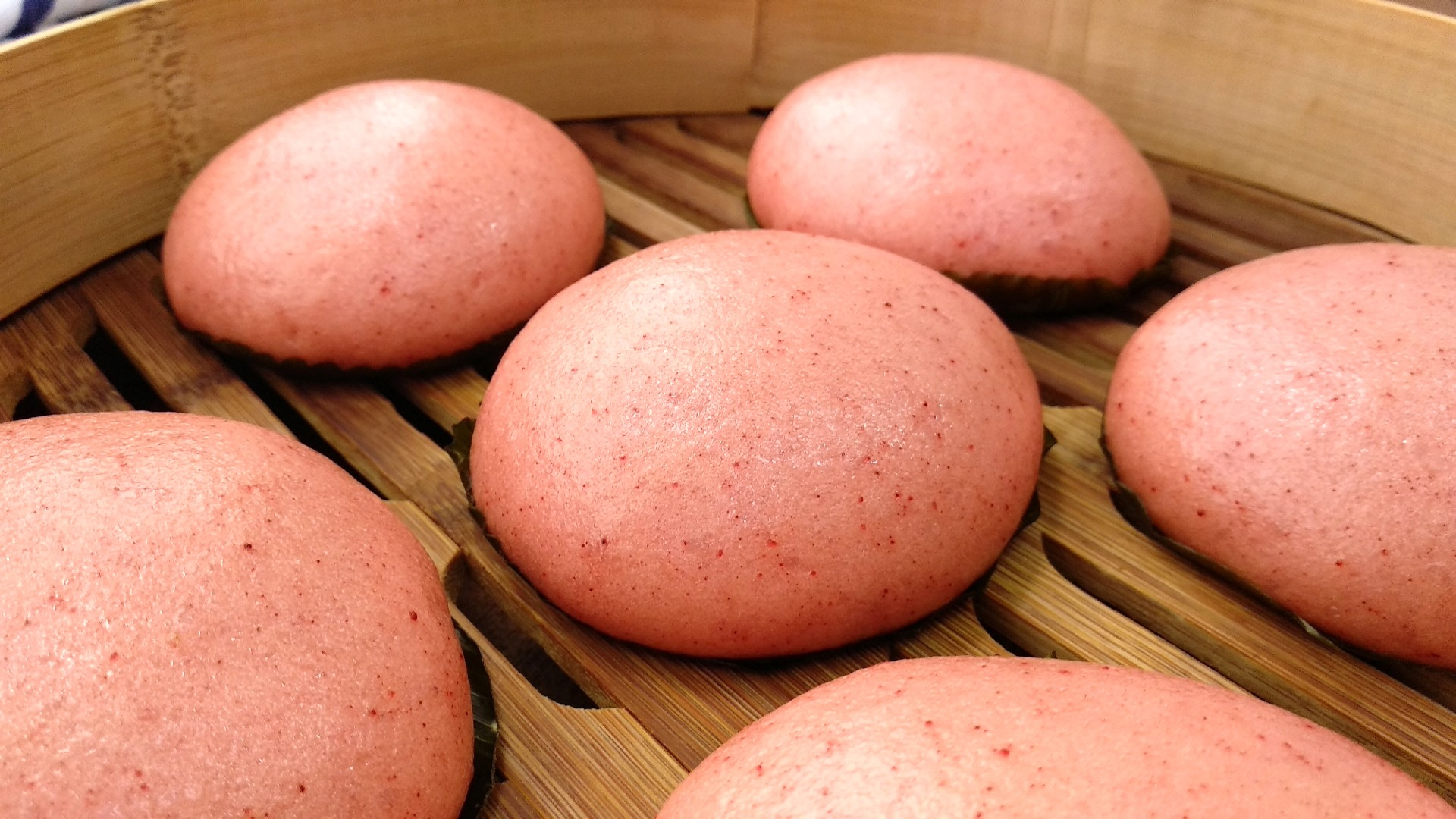
- Traditional red hee pan
- Alternative names: Hee pan
- Type: Pastry
- Course: Snack
- Place of origin: China
- Region or state: China and Southeast Asia
- Main ingredients: Glutinous rice flour

Hee pan (Chinese: 喜粄; pinyin: xǐbǎn) is a type of steamed rice cake of Chinese origin from the Hakka people. Traditional Hakka hee pan is made from rice milk (米浆) and red sugar. This gives hee pan its distinctive red coloring, chewy texture, and sweet taste.

Traditional red hee pan is prepared for important festivals such as the Lunar Chinese New Year and weddings. It is considered an auspicious food and is believed to bring prosperity, luck, and fortune to the people.

Nowadays, the consumption of hee pan is more commonly consumed as a pastry and no longer restricted to cultural festivities.

== Etymology ==
Hee pan is the romanization of "喜粄" from the Mandarin language in pinyin. "喜" (Hee) is pronounced as "xǐ", it means joyful.< The word “粄 " (Pan) is pronounced as "bǎn" is a cognate of the old Chinese language, Hakka dialect and the Hainanese dialect.

"粄" (Pan) has two components that make up its word structure. The principal indexing component of "粄" (Pan) is "米", pronounced as "mǐ".It is a noun that describes "raw rice grains". The radical component of "粄" (Pan) is “反”, pronounced as "fǎn".Derived from the word "饭" “fàn”, which means rice or a meal. "粄" (Pan), congruent to its auto-logical structure, it means meals that are made from rice or rice cakes.

Together, hee pan is a portmanteau of "喜" and “粄 " that translates into "Joyful rice cake".

== Ingredients and preparation ==
=== Traditional Hee pan ===
Traditional hee pan is made with only rice and red sugar and steamed over a piece of banana leaf. The banana leaf prevents it from sticking to the steamer and allows the steam to penetrate; adding natural fragrance to the hee pan.

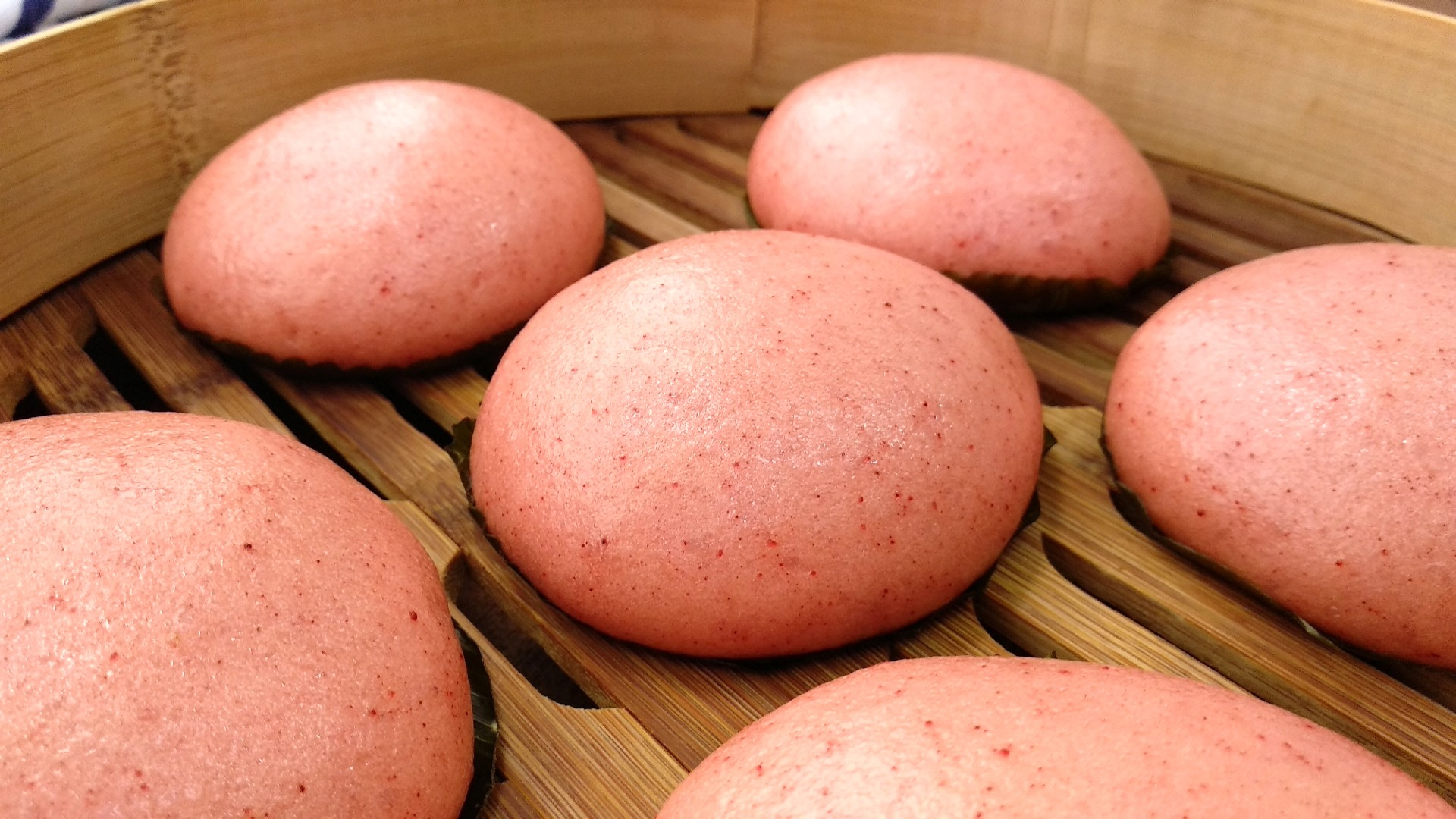
Traditional Red hee pan

Traditional hee pan is made by:

- Grounding the rice into finely milled rice milk
- Sieving the rice milk through a cloth to filter excess rice bits
- Letting the sieved rice milk to ferment for about 11 hours
- Adding traditional red sugar into the fermented rice milk, with sugar to milk ratio of 0.8: 1
- Kneading the fermented rice milk into a dough and shaping it into equal portions
- Steaming the portions over boiling water on a piece of banana leaf

=== Modern-day Hee pan ===
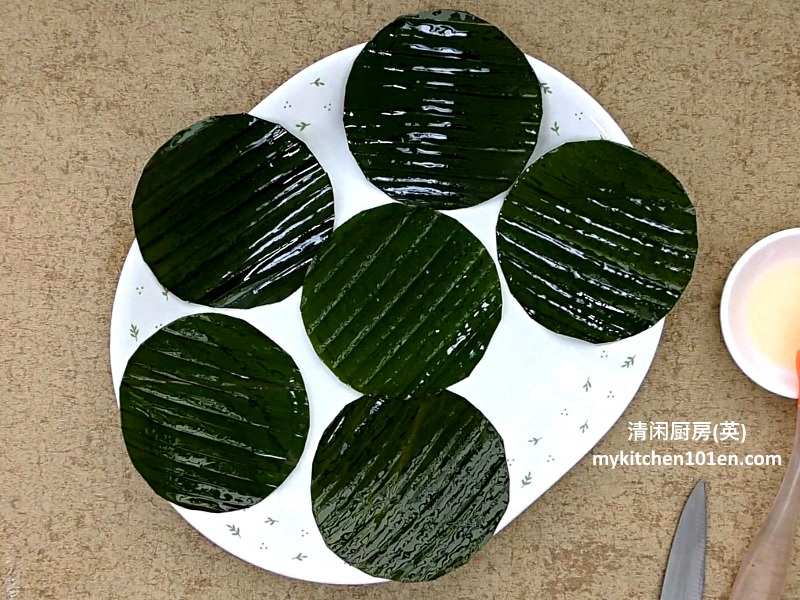
Banana leaves coated in oil

The modern-day hee pan is made from flour, glutinous rice flour, pandan leaves, hot water, sugar, instant yeast, red yeast rice powder, corn oil, and banana leaves. The dough is made from glutinous rice flour and flour instead of rice milk because it requires prior preparation. Banana leaves are coated with oil to make the hee pan more fragrant than the traditional recipe, and the red yeast rice powder gives the hee pan its coloring.

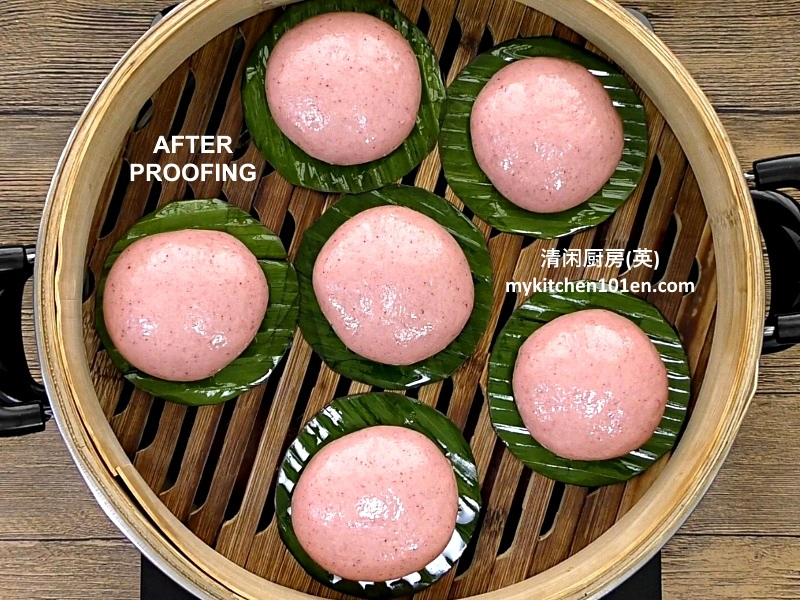
Hee pan proofing before steaming

Modern-day hee pan is made by:

- Boiling the pandan leaves with sugar to make sugar syrup
- Mixing the sugar syrup with flour, glutinous rice flour, red yeast rice powder, and instant yeast.
- Kneading the ingredients into a dough with corn oil
- Shaping the dough into portions and coating it with oil
- Placing the portions on oil coated banana leaves into a bamboo steamer
- Proofing the dough in the bamboo steamer over warm water for about 30 minutes
- Steaming the proofed hee pan for 12 minutes
- Leaving the lid of the bamboo steamer open to allow it to cool

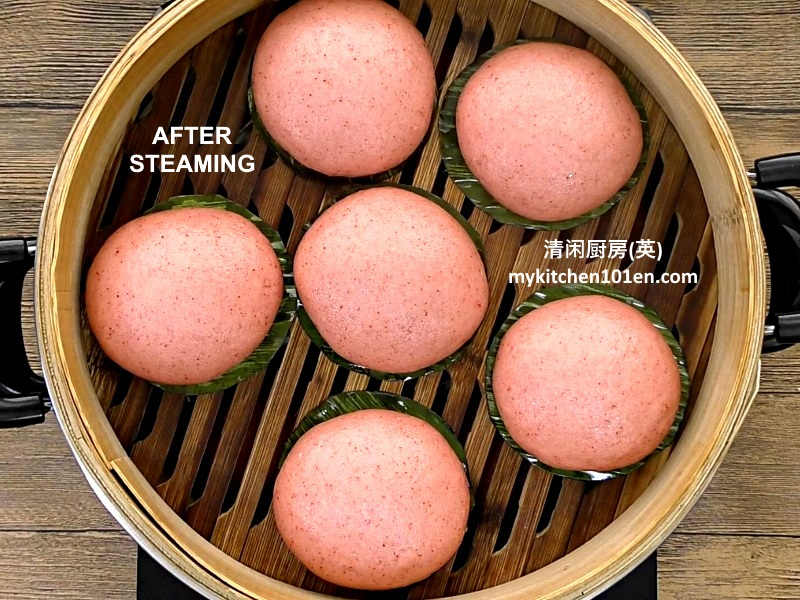
Steamed traditional red hee pan

=== Bamboo Steamer ===
Bamboo steamers are traditionally and presently used to steam hee pans.

Bamboo steamers are preferred for steaming because the structure of the bamboo steamer is airtight. It prevents condensation of water dripping onto the hee pan; preserving its original taste and texture of the hee pan.

== Variations ==
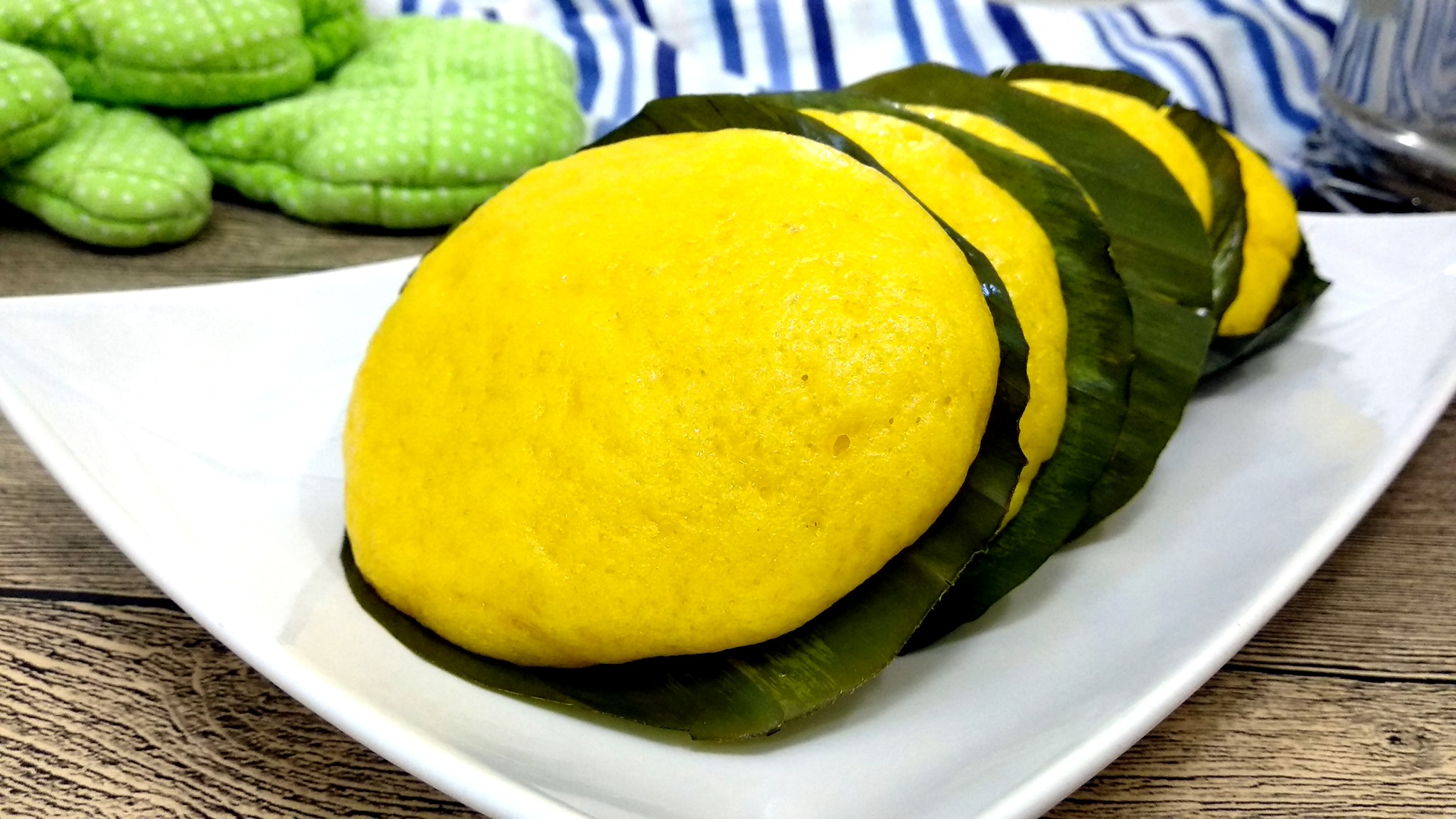
Pumpkin hee pan

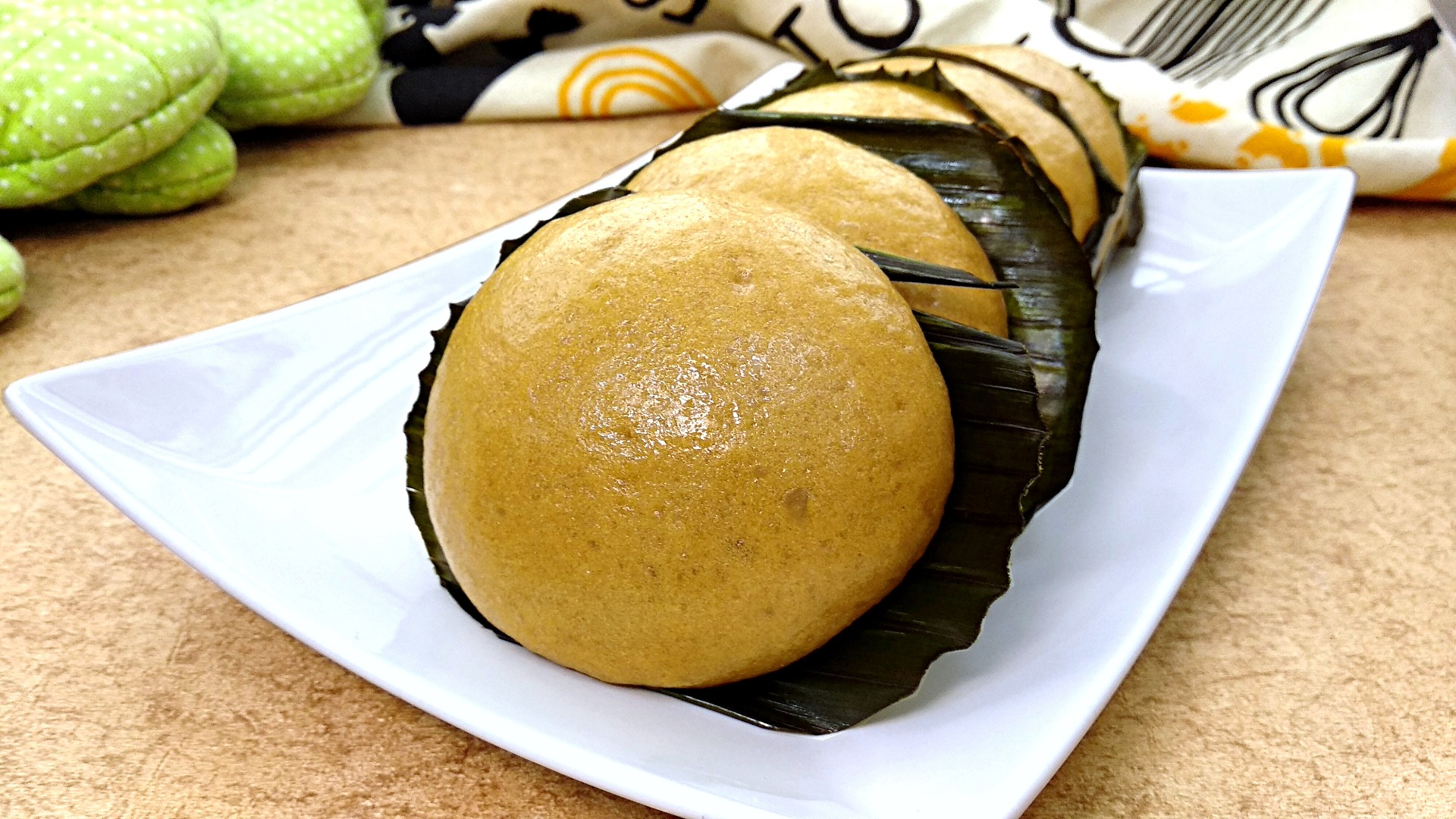
Brown sugar hee pan

Many bakeries and pastry shops have innovated to create new variants of the traditional hee pan. In Malaysia, apart from using red sugar to flavor and color the traditional hee pan, the hee pans are flavored and colored with new ingredients such as pandan, coconut sugar and more.

Pumpkin Hee pan

Steamed diced pumpkin and pandan leaves are utilized to flavor and color the dough instead of the traditional red sugar. The addition of steamed pumpkin and pandan leaves creates a natural pumpkin fragrant and yellow color.

Brown sugar Hee pan

The usage of the red sugar as a flavoring and coloring to the hee pan dough replaced by brown sugar. In addition to brown sugar, small amounts of baking soda are also added to neutralize the acidity of brown sugar.

Purple sweet potato Hee pan

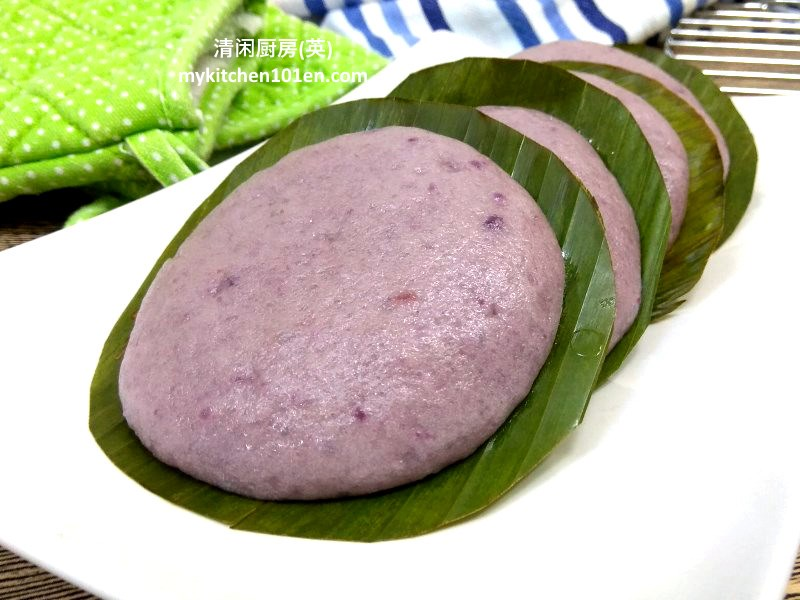
Purple sweet potato hee pan

Steamed purple sweet potato and pandan leaves are used to flavor and color the dough instead of the traditional red sugar. The additional of the purple sweet potato gives hee pan its natural fragrant and purple color.

== History ==
=== Origin ===
Hee pan derives from a wheat cake traditionally made by the Hakka people in their olden settlement, Zhong Yuan(中原) before the outbreak of the Disaster of Yongjia(永嘉之乱), which led to their migration to the south of China during Jin and Wei dynasties. The migration of the Hakka people has led to a settlement in Meizhou(梅州), a prefecture city in the Guangdong province in southern China.

Unlike, Zhong Yuan (中原) where vegetative crops and wheat were predominantly grown, the dominant agricultural crop in Meizhou(梅州) was rice and glutinous rice crops. As a consequence of ingredient differences due to contrasting geological conditions, rice and glutinous rice were used as a substitute ingredient for the making of the traditional Hakka wheat cake. In hopes to recreate the olden Hakka cuisine from the north, the Hakka settlers in Meizhou(梅州) have applied the same wheat cake making technique to rice and glutinous rice. As a result, hee pan is created along with the birth of the Hakka rice cake tradition during the Jin and Wei dynasties.

Over time, hee pan and the Hakka rice cake traditions of the south have become popular over the Tang and Song dynasties.

== Cultural importance ==
In Hakka and Chinese culture, the color red is historically symbolic of prosperity, luck, and longevity. As such, the traditional red hee pans are of high cultural significance and value amongst the Chinese people. The red color in the traditional hee pan symbolizes good fortune and happiness. The hee pans are typically associated with auspicious occasions and are prepared during festivities to symbolize blessings and good fortune.

=== Lunar Chinese New Year ===
Lunar Chinese New Year is an important festival in Chinese culture. It represents the start of a new year and new beginnings for everyone, where people reconcile and families reunite in harmony. During the first day of this festival, hee pan is offered to honor ancestors and deities on ritual altars. The Hakka people believe that the sweetness from the hee pan offerings will leave a sweet taste in the mouth of the deities and ancestors and so they will answer their prayers and bless the people with a prosperous year ahead.

Hee pan is also traditionally enjoyed throughout the Lunar Chinese New Year festival. In the Hakka culture, the sweetness of the hee pan represents the "sweet fruits of labor" and the consumption of hee pan during Lunar Chinese New Year will bring a blessed and "sweet" year ahead.

=== Qing Ming Festival ===
Qing Ming Festival is a 2,500-year-old tradition where the Chinese people visit the burial sites of their ancestors to sweep their tombs, pays respect and to commemorate their ancestors. To commemorate and show respect for the ancestors, prayers are conducted with tea and food such as hee pan is prepared as offerings to the ancestors. Unlike the usual red hee pan, the hee pan prepared for the Qing Ming festival is green, from the addition of wormwood. Green hee pans are traditionally prepared as offerings instead of red hee pans because green color symbolizes the descendants' grief and their hope that their ancestors are coping well in the afterlife.

Aside from being an offering, the green hee pan is also traditionally consumed during the Qing Ming festival. It is believed that the consumption of the green hee pan before, and after tomb sweeping service will bring great health and blessings from the ancestors for the upcoming four seasons of the year.

=== Full month party ===
In the Chinese customs, a full month celebration is held when a baby turns one month old in the Gregorian calendar, which equates to the baby turning a year old in the Lunar calendar. The ceremony is a tradition held to celebrate the baby's first month of life as it is historically hard for babies to live over a month old. The traditional red hee pan is distributed to family and friends during this time to celebrate this blessing of the survival of the baby and also to pray for vitality, luck, and blessings for a long life for the child.

=== Wedding ceremony ===
In Chinese culture, wedding ceremonies consists of several rituals. One of the first rituals held on a wedding day is the tea ceremony. This is where the bride and groom greet their respective future in-laws and family with tea. During the tea ceremony, the traditional red hee pan is served as a pastry for family and relatives. The traditional red hee pan is served to ward off evil as well as to bless to the couple for fertility and a long successful marriage.

== Economical aspect ==
Hee pan is economical to produce as it is traditionally made in bulk from two ingredients, sugar and rice. Hee pan is also filling and have a long shelf life compared to cooked rice. Over time, hee pan gained popularity and became an integral type of rice cake in the Hakka food culture.

== Availability ==
Hee pan is traditionally prepared at home during significant cultural festivities. Nowadays, hee pan has become a popular snack. It is commonly made and bought from bakeries and traditional pastry shops for cultural festivities and cravings. This is because the preparation of hee pan is time-consuming and more and more Chinese families living in cities have gradually replaced the tradition of making hee pan at home with store-bought alternatives.

== See also ==
- Dodol
- Kalamay
- Kuih
- List of steamed foods
- Mochi
- Rice cake
- Tteok
- Tteokbokki
- Red tortoise cake
- Peranakan cuisine
