= Omakase (restaurant) =

Japanese restaurant in San Francisco, California, U.S.

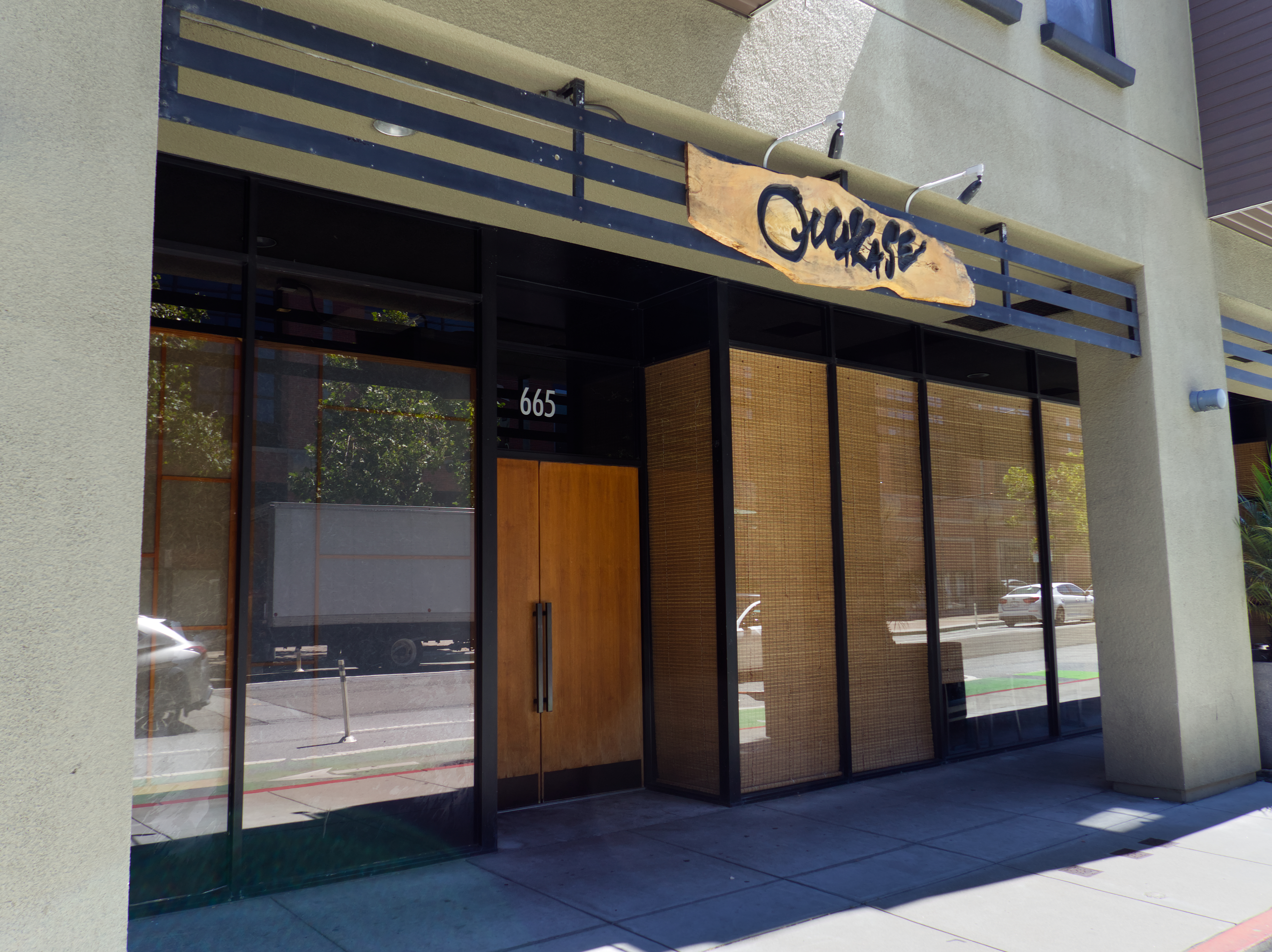
- The restaurant during the day in July 2026
- Interactive map of Omakase

Restaurant information
- Owners: Kash Feng; Jackson Yu
- Head chef: Jackson Yu
- Chef: Ingi Son; Masaki Sasaki
- Food type: Japanese
- Location: 665 Townsend Street, San Francisco, California, 94103, United States
- Coordinates: 37°46′14.5″N 122°24′10.5″W
- Seating capacity: 14
- Reservations: Yes
- Website: www.omakasesf.com

Omakase is a Japanese restaurant in the South of Market neighborhood in San Francisco, California. The 14-seat restaurant, owned by Kash Feng and chef Jackson Yu, has earned a Michelin star.

== Description ==
A 14-seat restaurant, Omakase serves Edomae-style sushi, chawanmushi with snow crab, uni, and ikura, nigiri, sea bream, monkfish liver, and mackerel with chive purée. Other dishes include a lobster tamago, wagyu, and red miso soup with clams. Customers can choose the amount of rice they need.

== History ==
The word "omakase" means "chef's choice" in Japanese. Owned by Kash Feng and Jackson Yu, the restaurant was opened.

== Reception ==
Omakase has earned a Michelin star. Rating the restaurant with an 8.6, Julia Chen and Lani Conway of The Infatuation stated that the restaurant was the "world's most casual fish Happy Hour", adding that the experience "feels like a party".

== See also ==
- List of Japanese restaurants
- List of Michelin-starred restaurants in California
