= Steaming =

Cooking technique

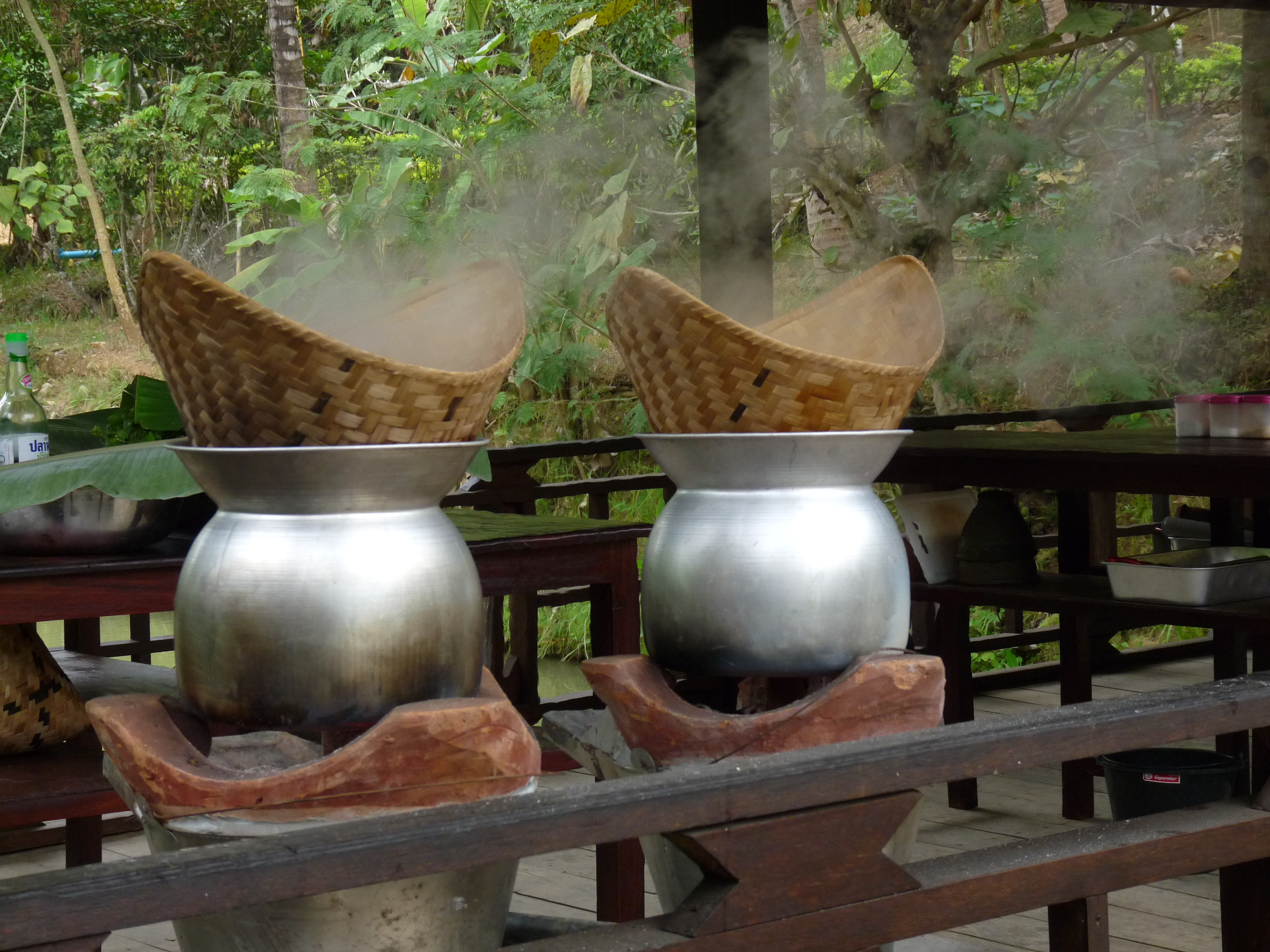
Traditional rice steamers in Laos

Steaming is a method of cooking using steam. In steaming, the food is fully immersed in steam, with no air present, so that the steam condenses on the food, and then the condensation drips down away from the food. This is often achieved in a food steamer, a kitchen appliance made specifically to cook food with steam, but food can also be steamed in a wok. In the American Southwest, steam pits used for cooking have been found dating back about 5,000 years. Steaming is considered a healthy cooking technique that can be used for many kinds of foods.

Compared to full immersion in boiling water, steaming can be far faster and more energy-efficient because it requires heating much less water and takes advantage of the excellent thermodynamic heat transfer properties of steam.

== History ==
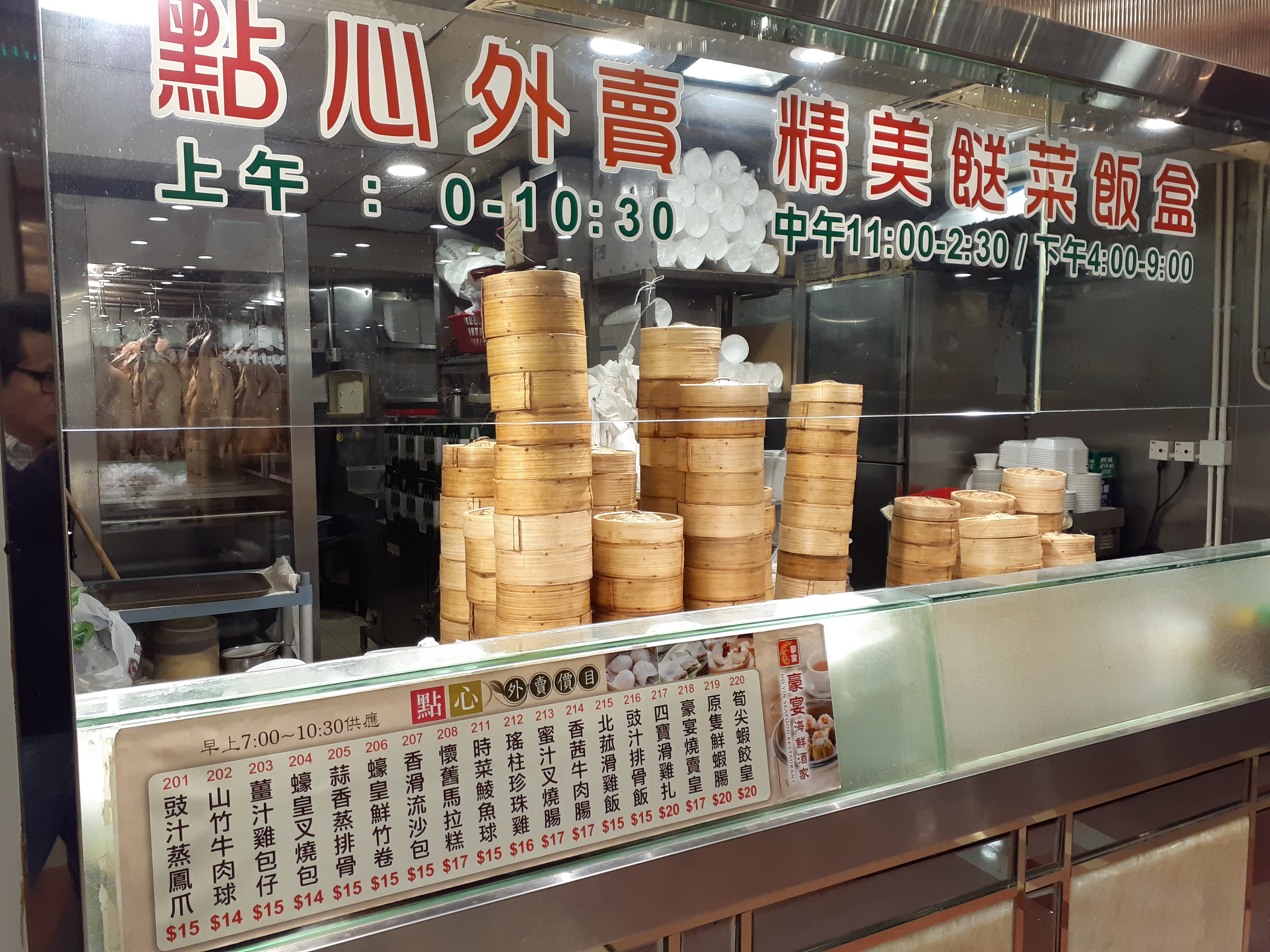
Bamboo steamers at a restaurant in Hong Kong

Some of the world's earliest examples of steam cooking were found in China's Yellow River Valley; early steam cookers made of stoneware have been found dating back as far as 5,000 BCE. And also in Gunma Prefecture, Japan, created during the Stone Age. Some of the earliest examples of steam cooking have been found in Italy and Sardinia, created during the Bronze Age, and in Cochise County, Arizona, where steam pits were used for cooking about 10,000 years ago. From the eighth century CE, thin cypress strips were used to make steamers; today, their slatted bases are constructed from bamboo. The classic steamer has a chimney in the center, which distributes the steam among the tiers.

While steaming has not caught on in the west for assorted dishes, the technique has been heavily popularized worldwide by Chinese and East Asian cuisine. The two main classic steamers feature the ancient bamboo steamer as well as the modern metal (aluminium or stainless steel) steamer, with the difference being that the bamboo lid takes longer to heat up but absorbs excess moisture and allows heat to condense again over the delicate food. Other developments were the creation of microwaveable silicone steamers and plastic-hybrid steamers.

== Method ==
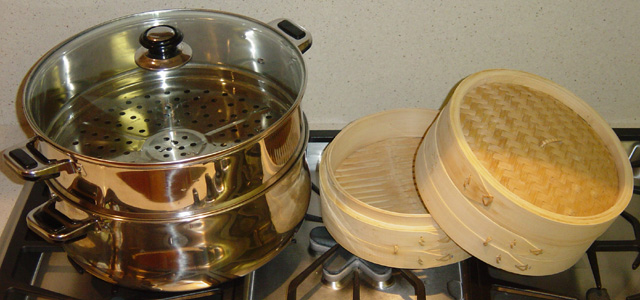
Two types of steaming vessels, metal and wood with bamboo

Steaming works by boiling water continuously, causing it to vaporize into steam; the steam excludes the air and carries heat to the nearby food, thus cooking the food. The food is kept separate from the boiling water but has direct contact with the steam, which condenses on the food as it heats it, resulting in a moist texture to the food. Pressure steaming is similar but is done at raised pressure inside a pressure cooker without submerging the food in the liquid. Steaming is also distinct from double boiling, in which food is not directly exposed to steam.

Such cooking is most often done by placing the food in a food steamer, typically a circular container made of metal, wood, or bamboo. The steamer usually has a lid that is placed on top of the container during cooking to allow the steam to cook through the food. When a steamer is unavailable, food can be steamed inside a wok, supported over boiling water in the bottom of the wok by a metal frame. Some modern home microwave ovens include a structure to cook food with steam vapor produced in a separate water container, providing a similar result to being cooked on a stove. There are also specialized steam ovens available.

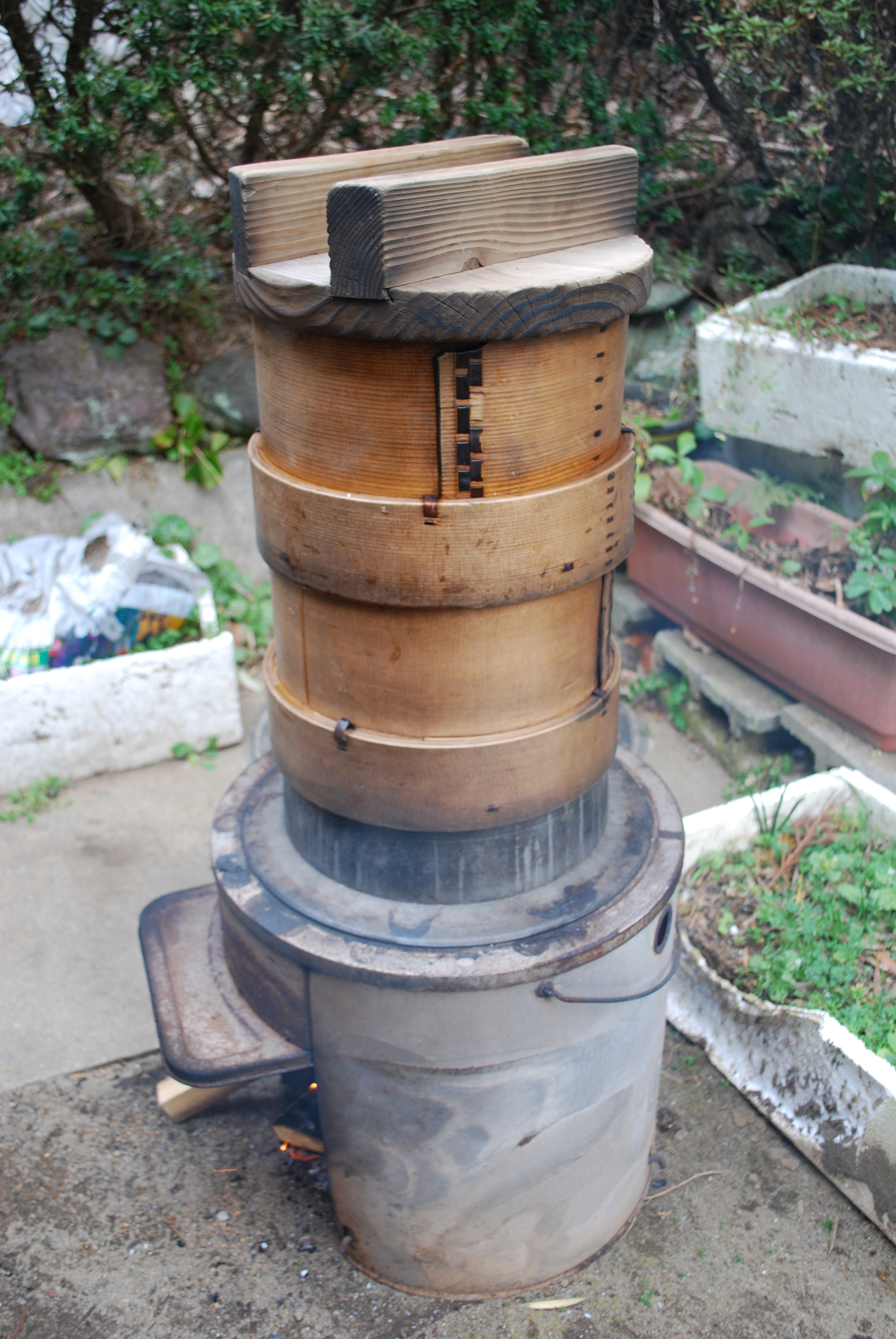
A simple hearth with a metal pan holding two wooden steaming vessels and a wooden lid used in Japan

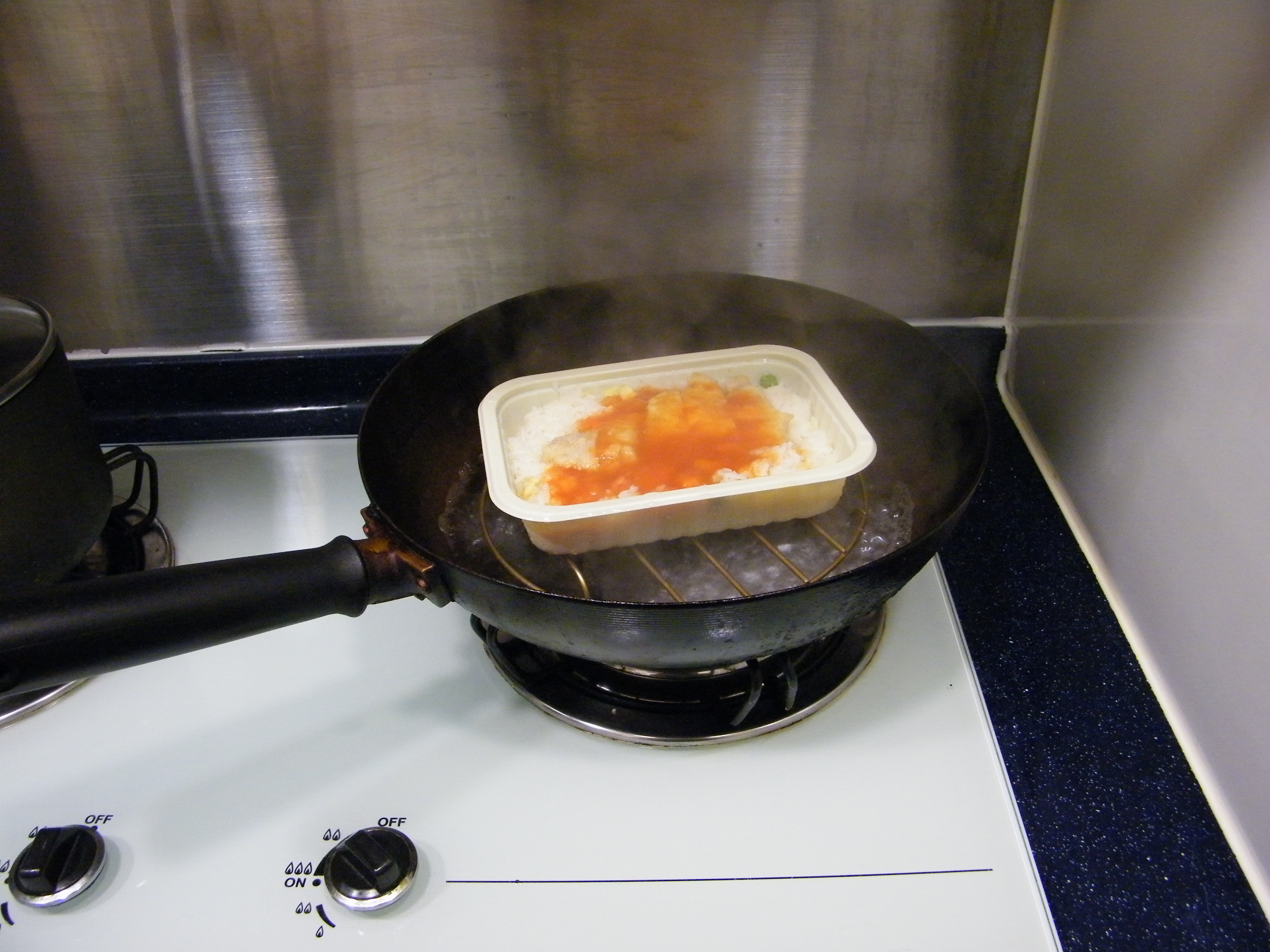
A makeshift steaming vessel with lid removed; a frozen dish is placed on a metal frame in a single handled wok with water.

== Benefits ==
Overcooking or burning food is easily avoided when steaming it. Individuals preferring to avoid additional fat intake may prefer steaming to methods which require cooking oil.

A 2007 USDA comparison between steaming and boiling vegetables shows the most affected nutrients are folic acid and vitamin C. When compared to raw consumption, steaming reduces folic acid by 15%, and boiling reduces it by 35%. Steaming reduces vitamin C by 15%, and boiling reduces it by 25%.

Steaming, compared to boiling, showed 42% higher amount of glucosinolates in broccoli cooked for medium firmness. Phenolic compounds with antioxidant properties have been found to retain significantly better through steaming than through boiling or microwaving. Steaming compared to boiling retained β-carotene in carrots. The effect of cooking food may increase or decrease the nutrients.

== Steamed foods ==
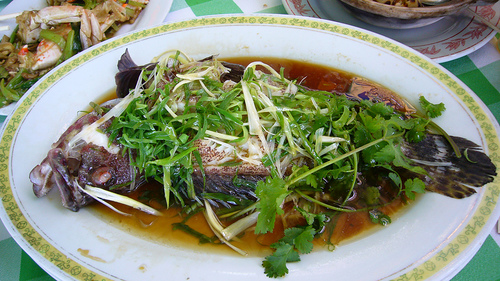
Cantonese cuisine, steamed fish, seasoned with soy sauce, coriander and Welsh onion

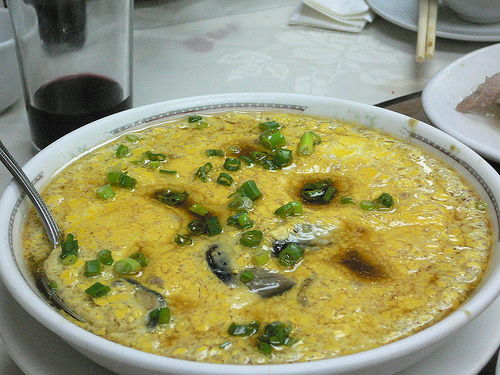
Chinese steamed eggs

=== Western cooking ===
In Western cooking, steaming is most often used to cook vegetables—it is rarely used to cook meats. However, steamed clams are prepared by steaming. With Chinese cuisine, vegetables are usually stir fried or blanched and seldom steamed. Seafood and meat dishes are steamed. For example: Steamed whole fish, steamed crab, steamed pork spare ribs, steamed ground pork or beef, steamed chicken and steamed goose.

=== Rice ===
Rice can be steamed too, although in Chinese cooking this is simply referred to as "cooking" rather than "steaming". In Thailand steaming is the definition of minimalist cooking. Wheat foods are steamed as well. Examples include buns and Chinese steamed cakes. Similarly, in Mexican and Central American cuisine, tamales are made by steaming a dough made from nixtamalized maize (called masa) in wrappers made from corn husks or banana leaves; the dough can be stuffed or left plain.

=== Chinese dishes ===
Steamed meat dishes (except fish and some dim sum) are less common in Chinese restaurants than in traditional home cooking, because meats usually require longer cooking times to steam than to stir fry. Commercially sold frozen foods (such as dim sum) formerly had instructions to reheat by steaming, until the rise in popularity of home microwave ovens, which have considerably shorter cooking times.

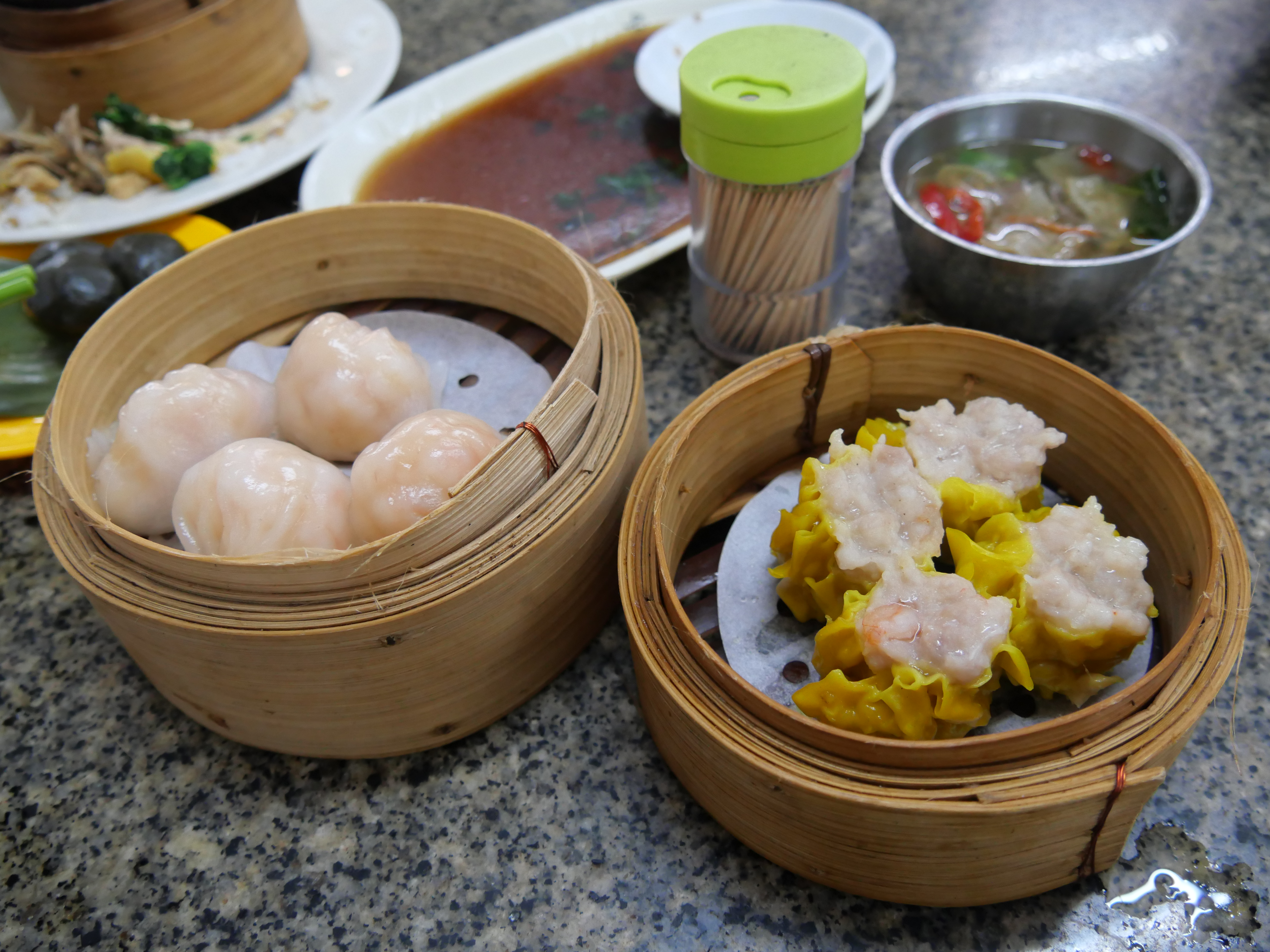
Steamed har giao and siu mai

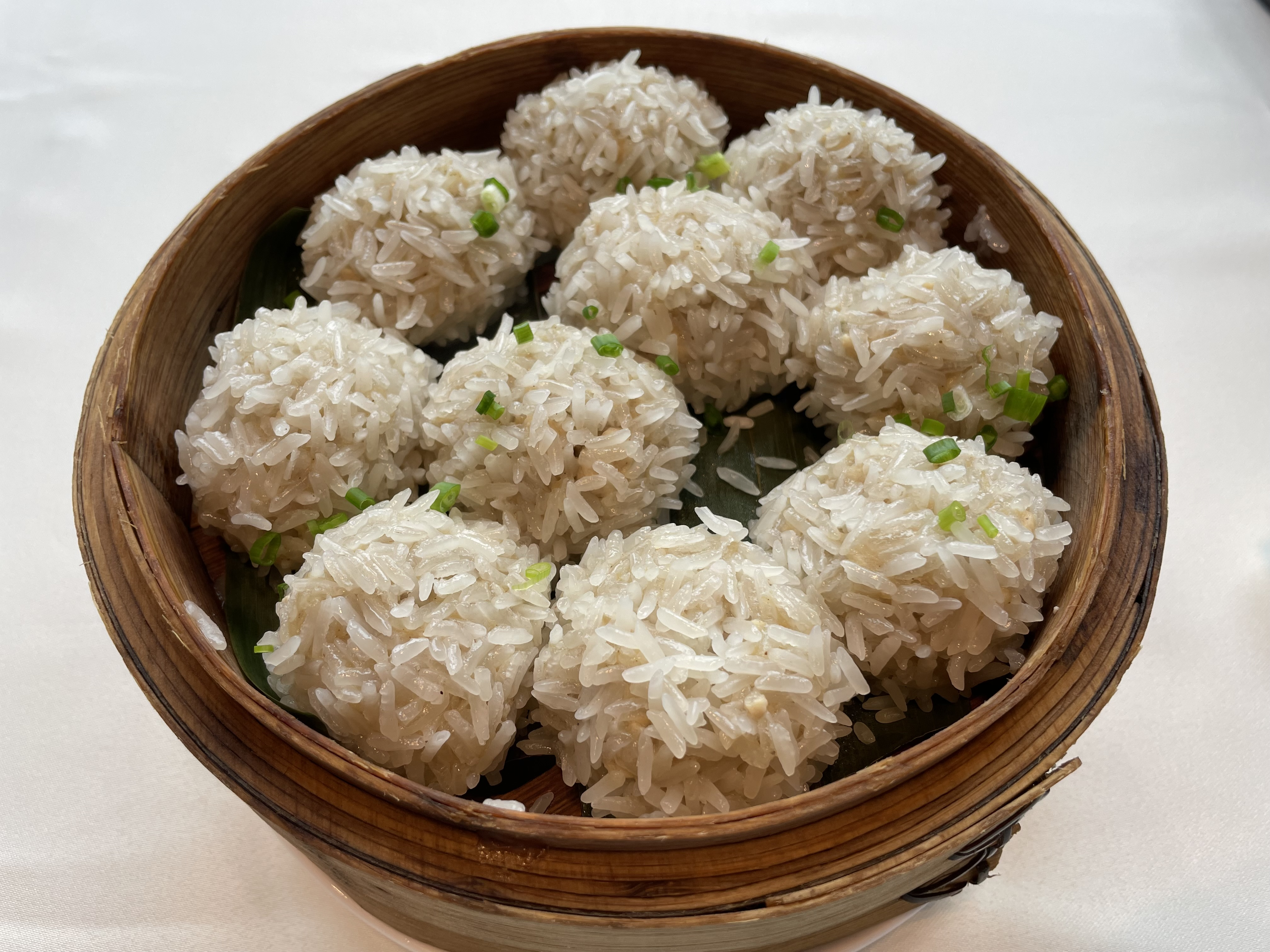
Steamed pearl meatballs

Staple foods

- Mantou, steamed buns
- Wotou, Chinese cornbread

Dim sum

- Siu mai, meat dumplings
- Har gao, shrimp dumplings
- Baozi, filled buns
- Lion's head meatballs
- Steamed meatballs
- Pearl meatballs, pork meatballs covered in sticky rice

Rice

- Steamed rice with crab, Fujian cuisine called 蠘飯 (蟳飯)
- Fenzhengrou (粉蒸肉): Steamed pork with rice flour

Seafood

- Fish: Chinese perch, grouper, Japanese black porgy
- Crab: Chinese mitten crab, Shanghai cuisine for the autumn

Soup

- Weitang: Steamed pork rib soup, Jiangxi cuisine
- Buddha Jumps Over the Wall: Fujian cuisine
- Winter Melon Soup: Using a hollowed out and sculpted gourd as a vessel
- Qi Guoji Steamed Chicken Soup: Chicken soup cook in a double steamer, Yunnan cuisine

Sweets

- Double skin milk, said to be made in the 1850s in Daliang in Foshan, Guangdong
- Guilinggao: also known as Turtle Jelly, a jelly-like Chinese medicine, also sold as a dessert

Others

- Chinese steamed eggs similar to custard with local variety of ingredients and vessels.
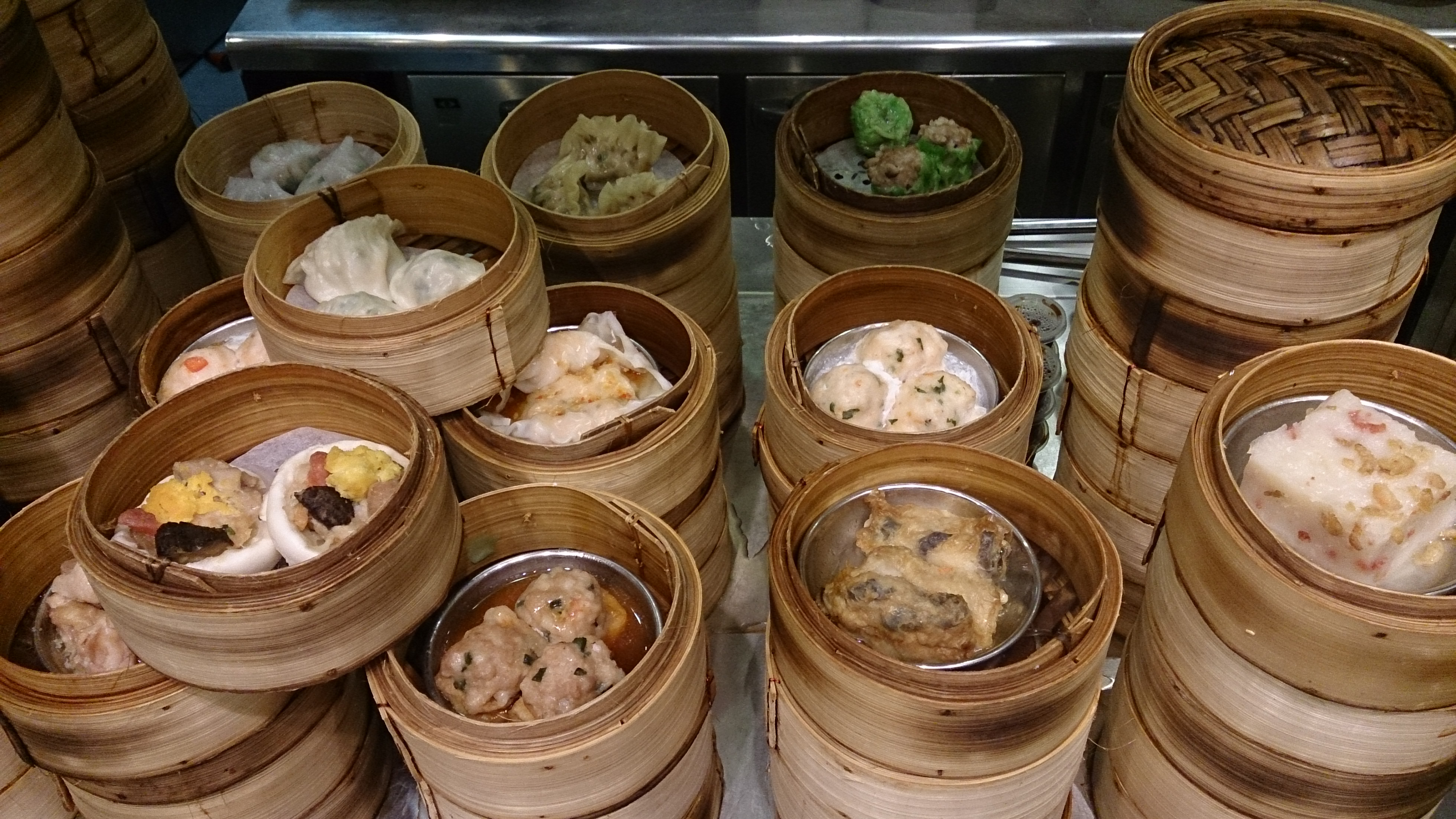
Variety of dim sum

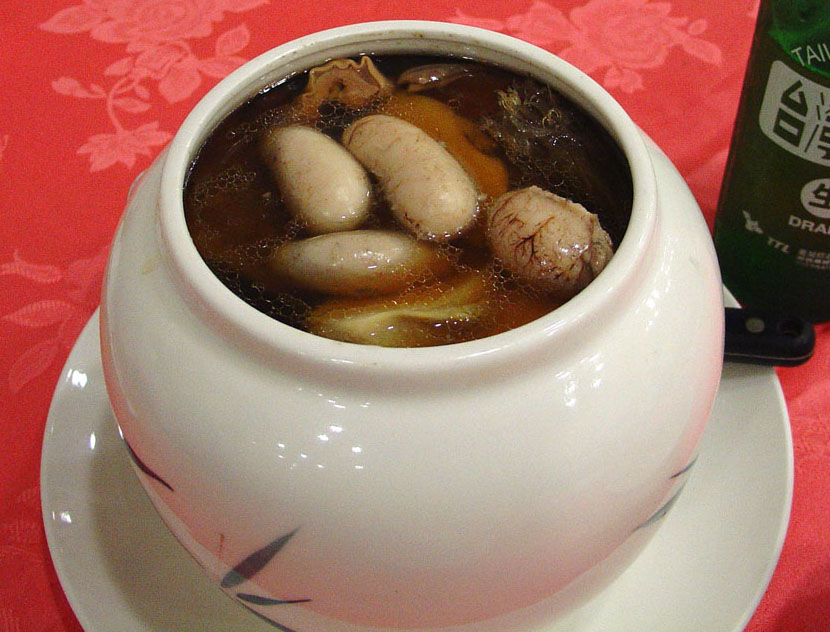
Buddha Jumps Over the Wall, or Buddha's Temptation

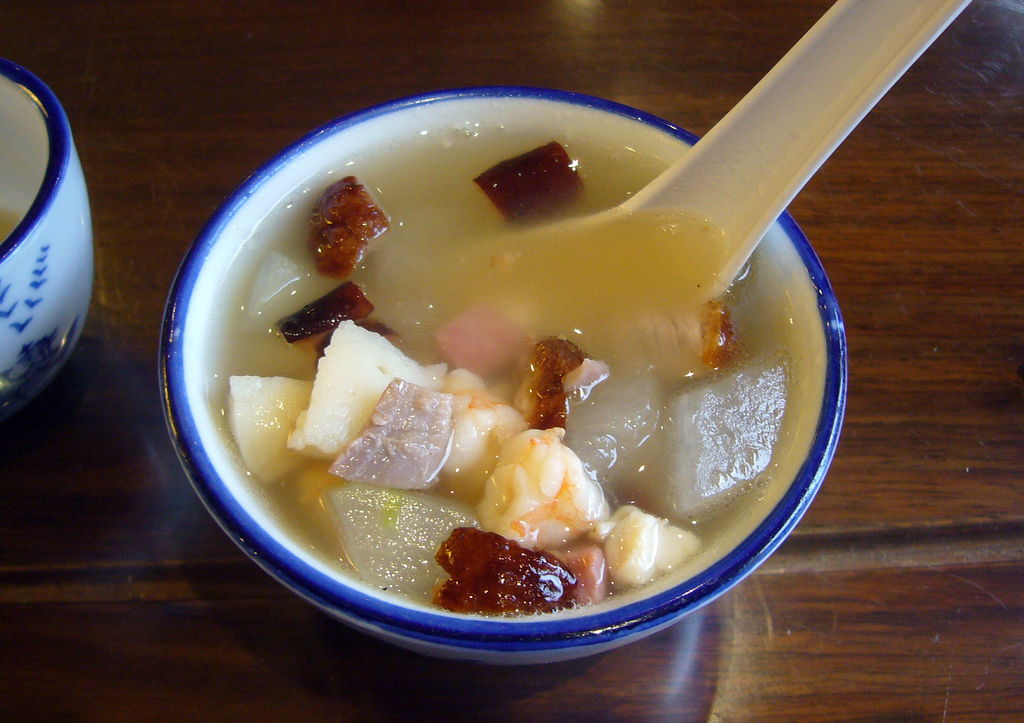
A small bowl of winter melon soup

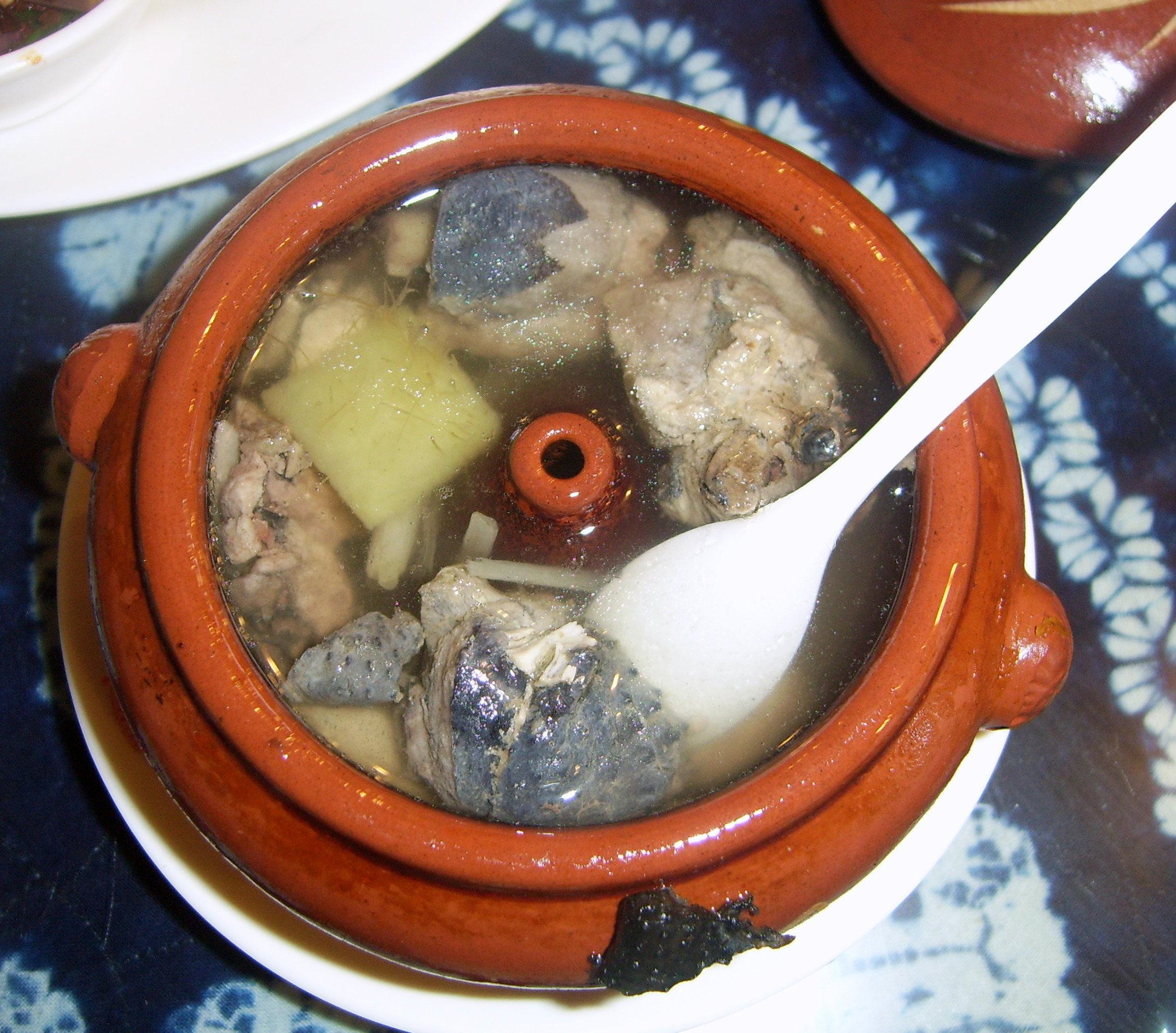
Steamed silkie soup

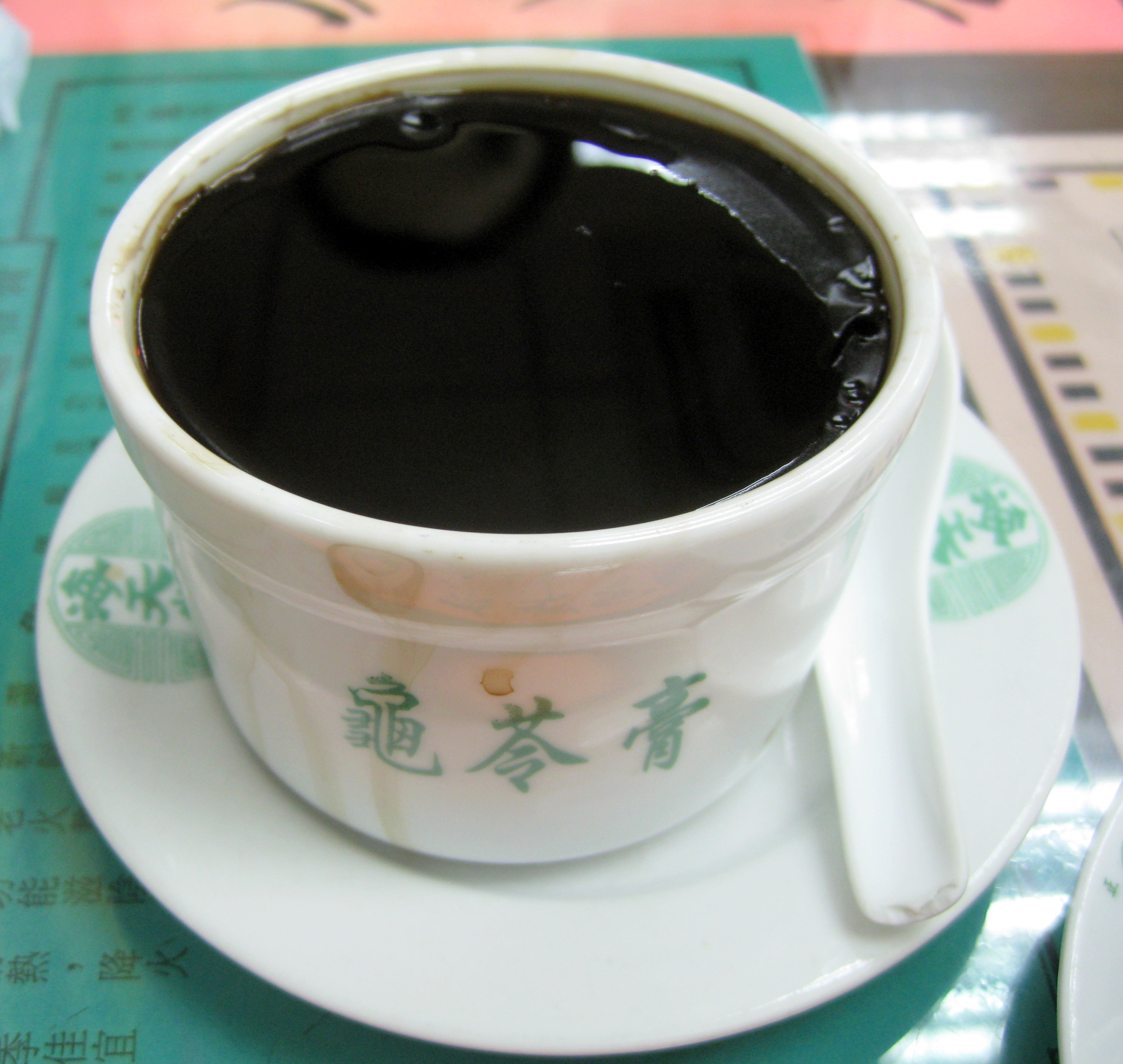
Turtle jelly

=== Japanese dishes ===
In Japan, glutinous rice is steamed to prepare mochi rice cakes. Traditional Japanese sweets or wagashi making involves steaming rice or wheat dough for making mochigashi and manju.

- Glutinous rice. Instead of boiling, glutinous rice is steamed to eat. Okowa (おこわ (強飯)) as it is called, receipts with ingredients and vessel chestnuts (kuri okowa) or wild herbs (sansai okowa) are popular.

- Red rice (赤飯, sekihan): served at festive occasions with azuki bean and color agent added to enhance red color.
- Mochi: prepared with steamed rice and kneaded.

- Chawanmushi: savory egg custard
- Odamaki-mushi: udon in a cup of chawan-mushi. Osaka specialty.

There are recipes where sauce is added to the main ingredients, aiming to control smell or aroma, or keep moisture to the ingredients.

- Awayukimushi: egg meringue over fish or seafood and keep moisture as well as retain aroma.
- Kaburamushi: grated or shredded turnip covers crabs and fish to keep moisture.
- Sakamushi: add sake to steam sea bream and clams which will reduce fishy smell.

Recipes named after the container.

- Dobin-mushi: matsutake and fish in a pot together with dashi soup.
- Yugama: yuzu citrus is hollowed out into a cup to hold and add zest to the food.

- Sea bream milt steamed in yugama

Sweets: steaming is an important process in Japanese sweets making such as manjū, yōkan, uirō, karukan or suama.

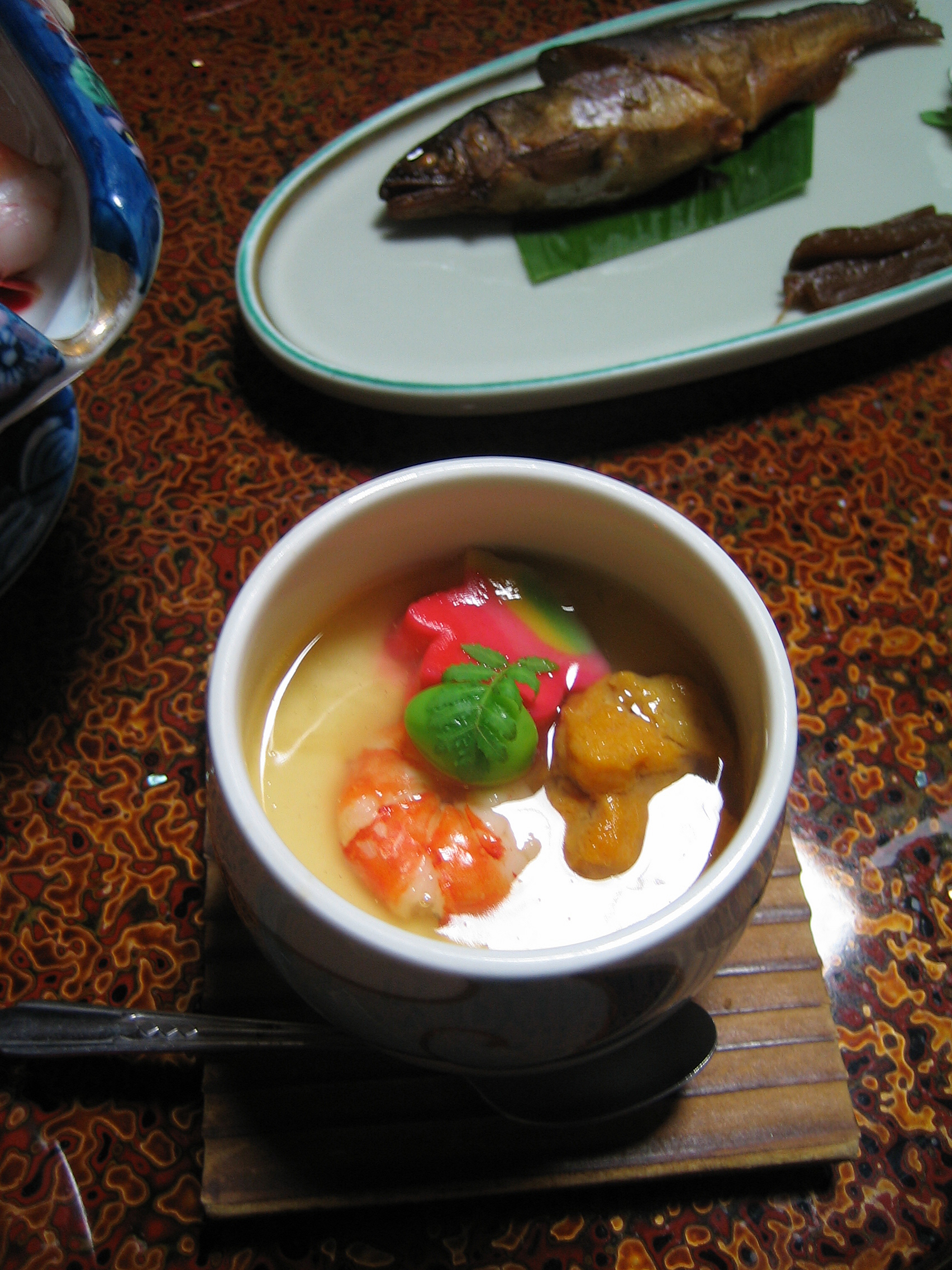
Chawanmushi (foreground)

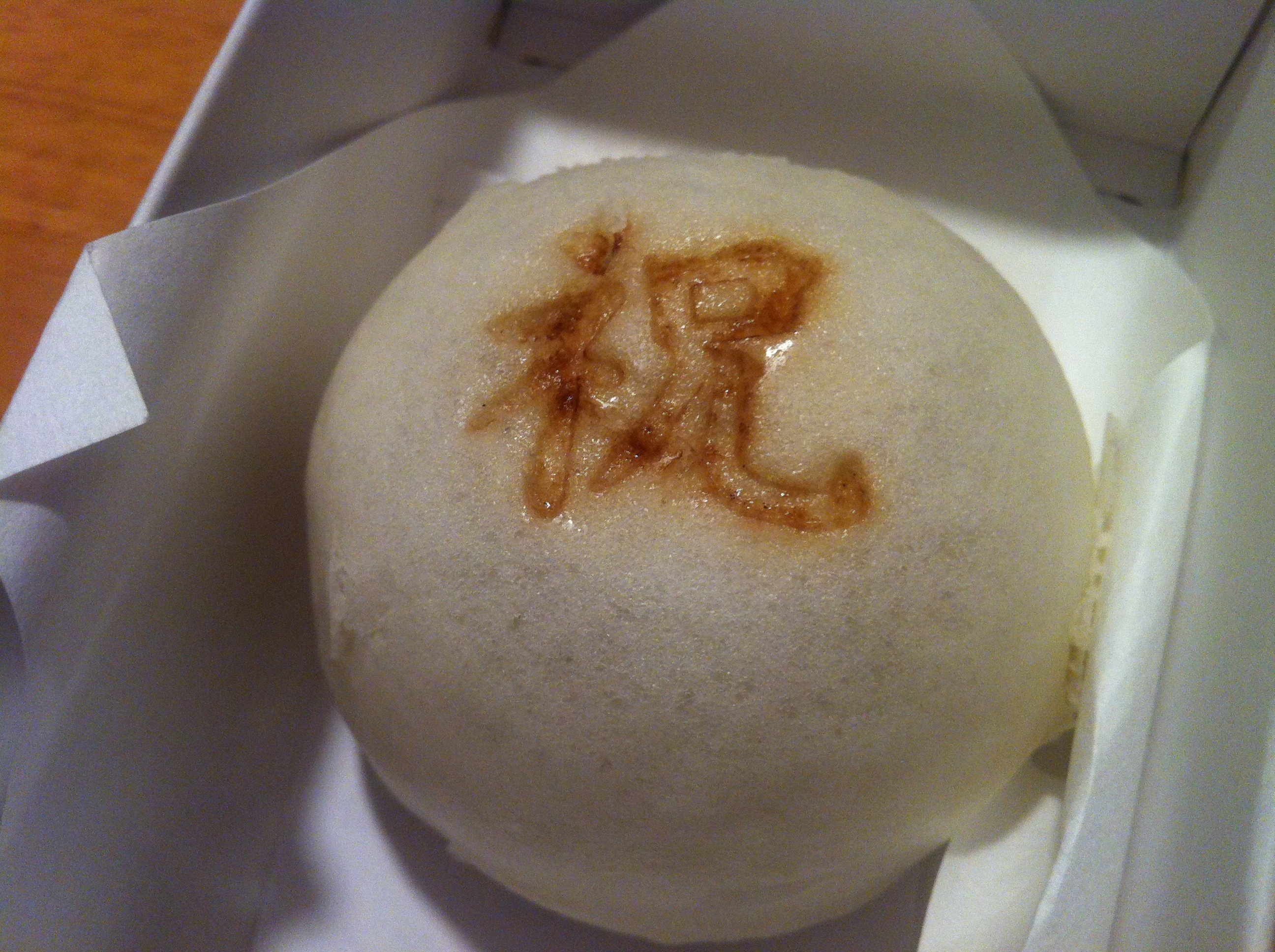
Manjū

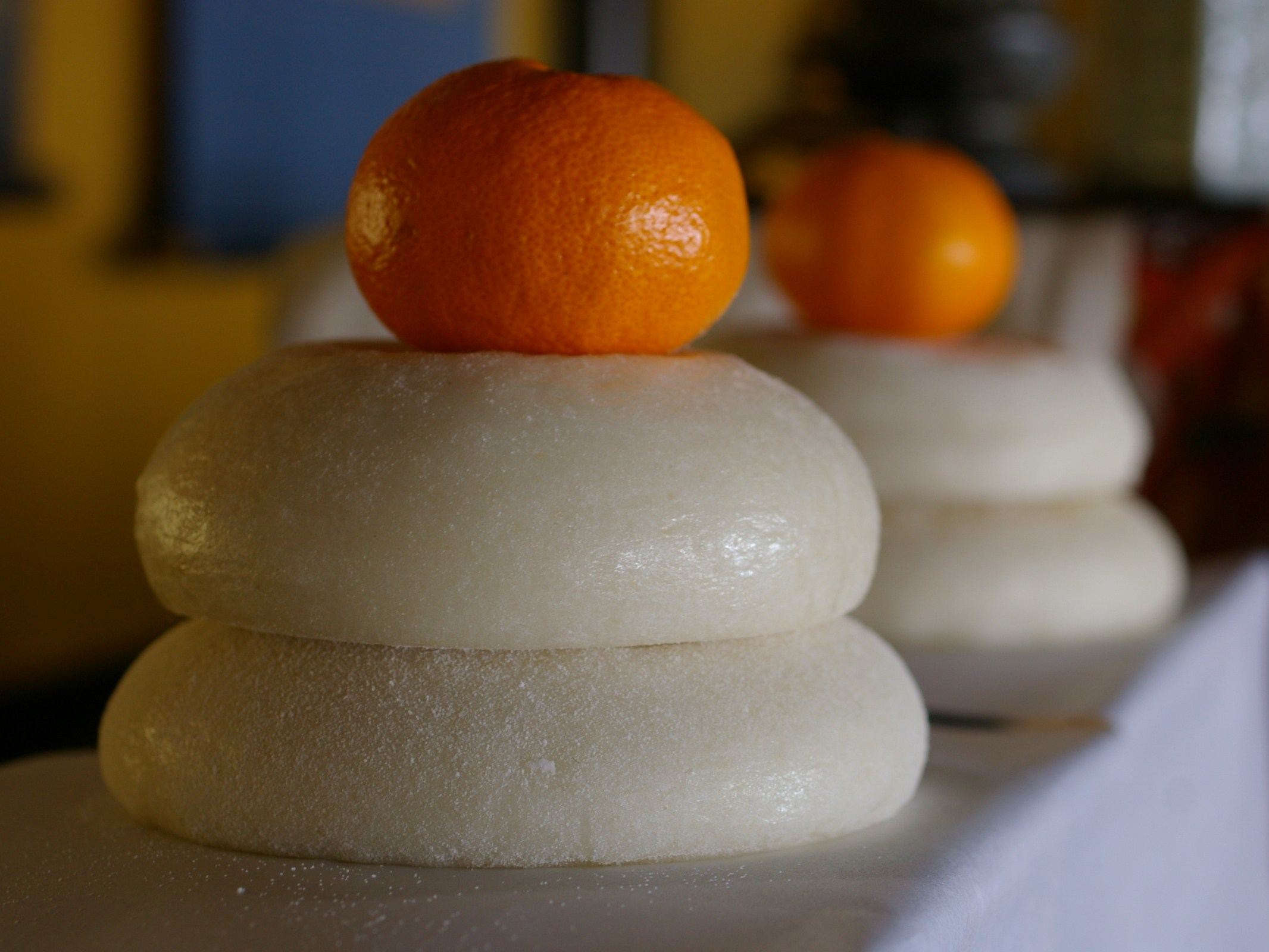
Mochi as offering to the deities

=== Korean dishes ===
- Gyeran-jjim, a custardy dish

== See also ==
- Bamboo steamer, an East Asian steamer made from bamboo
- Double steaming
- List of steamed foods
- Siru, a Korean earthenware steamer
