= Chinese steamed eggs =

Chinese egg dish

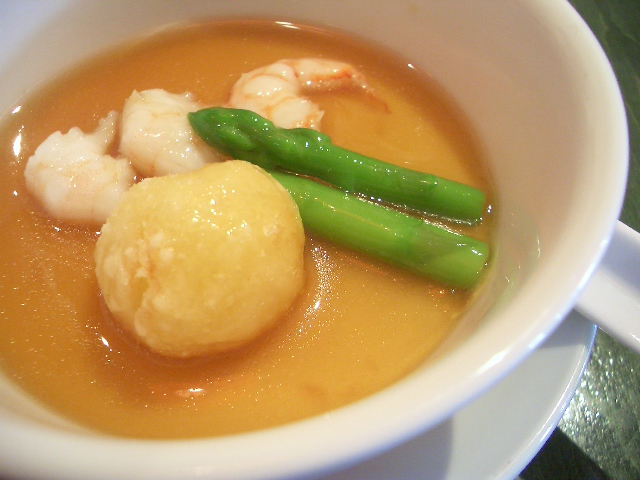
- Chinese steamed egg topped with broth and other ingredients
- Alternative names: Water egg
- Place of origin: China
- Region or state: Chinese-speaking areas
- Main ingredients: Egg, water or chicken broth
- Ingredients generally used: scallion, century egg, or dried shrimp
- Variations: Chawanmushi, Gyeran jjim

Chinese steamed eggs
- Chinese: 鸡蛋羹
Transcriptions
Standard Mandarin
- Hanyu Pinyin: Jīdàn gēng
Yue: Cantonese
- Yale Romanization: Gāidáan gāng
Southern Min
- Hokkien POJ: ke-tàn kinn

Alternative Chinese name
- Chinese: 蒸水蛋
- Literal meaning: steam water egg
Transcriptions
Standard Mandarin
- Hanyu Pinyin: Zhēngshuǐ dàn
Yue: Cantonese
- Yale Romanization: Jīngséui dáan
- Jyutping: zing1seoi2 daan2
Southern Min
- Hokkien POJ: tsing-tsuí tàn

Second alternative Chinese name
- Chinese: 蒸蛋
Transcriptions
Standard Mandarin
- Hanyu Pinyin: Zhēng dàn
Yue: Cantonese
- Yale Romanization: Jīng dáan
Southern Min
- Hokkien POJ: tsing tàn

Third alternative Chinese name
- Chinese: 水蒸蛋
Transcriptions

Chinese steamed eggs or water egg (鸡蛋羹) is a traditional Chinese dish found all over China. Eggs are beaten to a consistency similar to that used for an omelette and then steamed. It is sometimes referred to as egg custard on menus. It is associated with children, the elderly and the infirm due to the little chewing it requires.

== Preparation ==
The eggs are beaten and water added to create a more tender texture. One ratio of water to eggs may be 1.5:1. Sesame oil, soy sauce, wine, or chicken broth are sometimes added for flavor.

In Hunan, stocks made from pork bones are common.

Other solid ingredients (such as mushrooms, clams, or crab meat) may also be added to the mixture. The egg mixture is poured into a dish, which is then placed in a steamer and steamed until the eggs are just firm, with a still-silky texture. A plate is usually placed on top of the bowl containing the egg mixture and left on while the egg is being steamed. Uncapped steamed eggs will have water on top of the finished dish due to the steam.

When steamed in wooden steaming baskets, some steam escapes preventing pressure from building. In metallic steaming implements such steam does not escape unless the lid is set ajar. Food writer Fuchsia Dunlop warns that Chinese steamed eggs can turn out "stringy", advising "cook the eggs very gently, and not for too long."

=== Other cooking methods ===
This same dish can be cooked in a microwave, or in a pressure cooker. Both methods take less time, although flavor and texture differ.

== Variations ==
Homemade versions might include scallion, century egg, dried shrimp, or minced pork. These additional ingredients are added to the egg mixture before steaming. It is sometimes seasoned with soy sauce. The taste is usually savory (as opposed to a sweet custard).

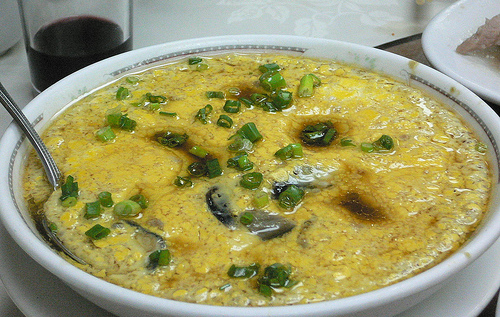

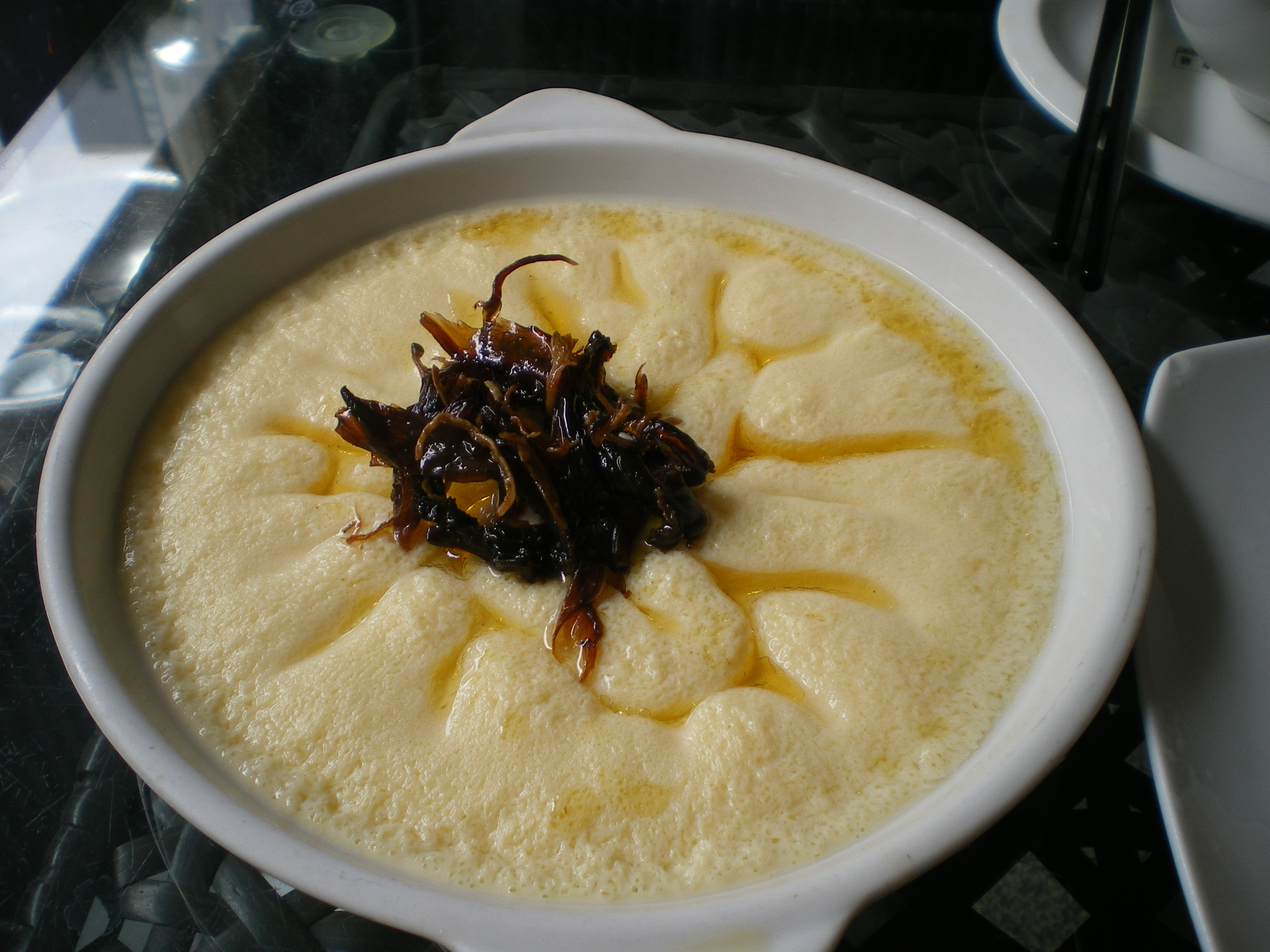

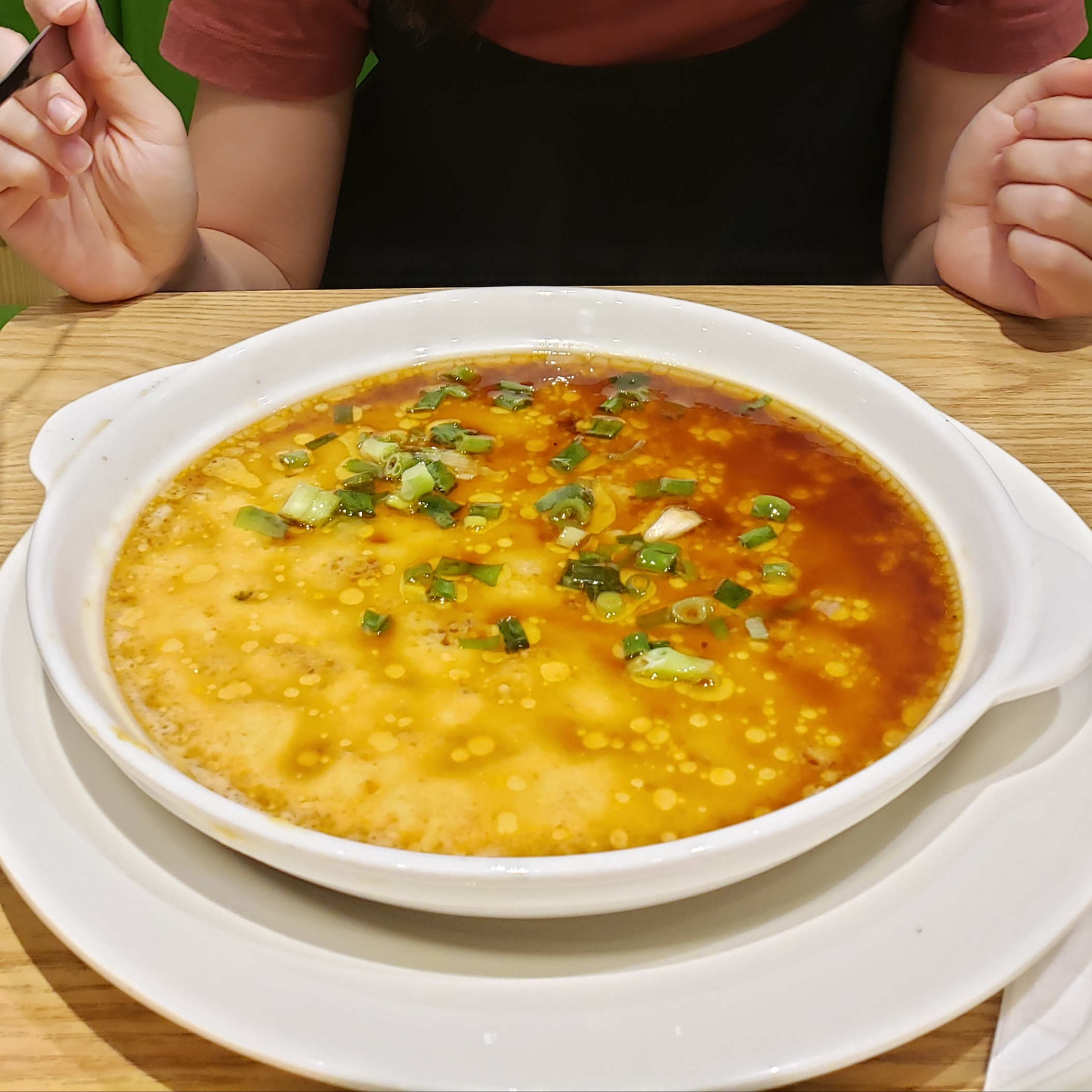

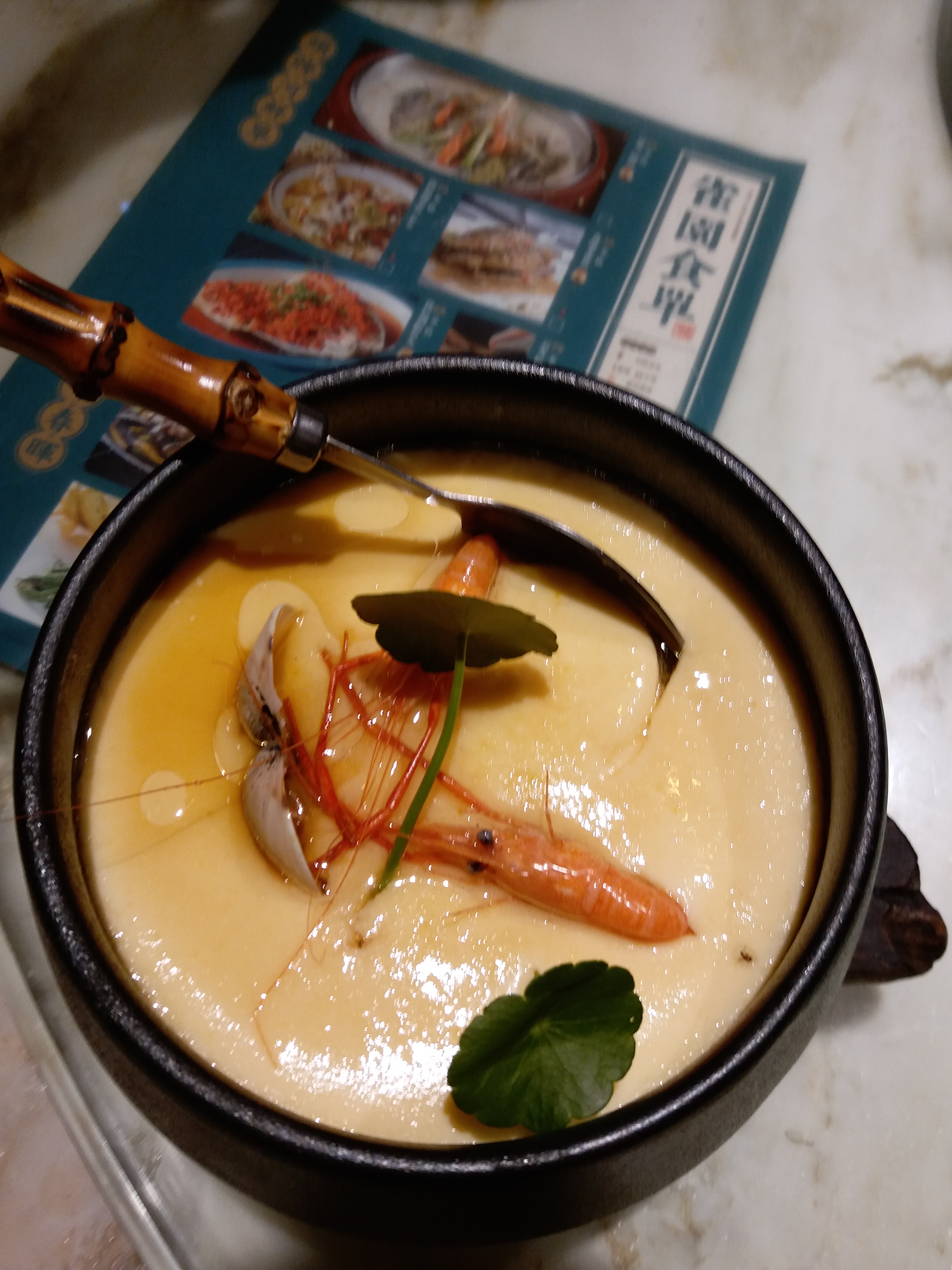

== See also ==
- Chawanmushi – A Japanese egg custard dish
- Gyeran jjim – Korean steamed eggs
- List of egg dishes
- List of steamed foods
