= Purple sweet potato color =

Natural food coloring obtained from the sweet potato

Purple sweet potato color (PSPC) is a natural anthocyanin food coloring obtained from the sweet potato (Ipomoea batatas). Some cultivars, like the Ayamurasaki, released in Japan in 1995, are specially developed to have a higher anthocyanin content.

It is reported to have potential application as an antimutagenic, antioxidant, and anti-inflammatory. There is evidence it is protective against injury induced by D-galactose and has potential as a treatment for galactosemia.

The following chemical components of PSPC have been identified.

- cyanidin 3-caffeoylsophoroside-5-glucoside
- peonidin 3-caffeoylsophoroside-5-glucoside
- cyanidin 3-caffeoyl-p-hydroxybenzoylsophoroside-5-glucoside
- peonidin 3-caffeoyl-p-hydroxybenzoyl-sophoroside-5-glucoside
- peonidin-caffeoyl-feruloylsophoroside-5-glucoside
- cyanidin 3-caffeoylsophoroside-5-glucoside
- cyanidin 3-(6′′,6′′′-dicaffeoylsophoroside)-5-glucoside
- cyanidin 3-(6′′-caffeoyl-6′′′-feruloylsophoroside)-5-glucoside
- peonidin 3-O-(6-O-(E)-caffeoyl-2-O-beta-D-glucopyranosyl-beta-D-glucopyranoside)-5-O-beta-D-glucoside
- cyanidin 3-O-(6-O-p-coumaroyl)-beta-D-glucopyranoside
- peonidin 3-O-(2-O-(6-O-(E)-caffeoyl-beta-D-glucopyranosyl)-6-O-(E)-caffeoyl-beta-D-glucopyranoside)-5-O-beta-D-glucopyranoside
- peonidin 3-O-(2-O-(6-O-(E)-feruloyl-beta-D-glucopyranosyl)-6-O-(E)-caffeoyl-beta-D-glucopyranoside)-5-O-beta-D-glucopyranoside
