= Gyeran-jjim =

Korean steamed egg dish

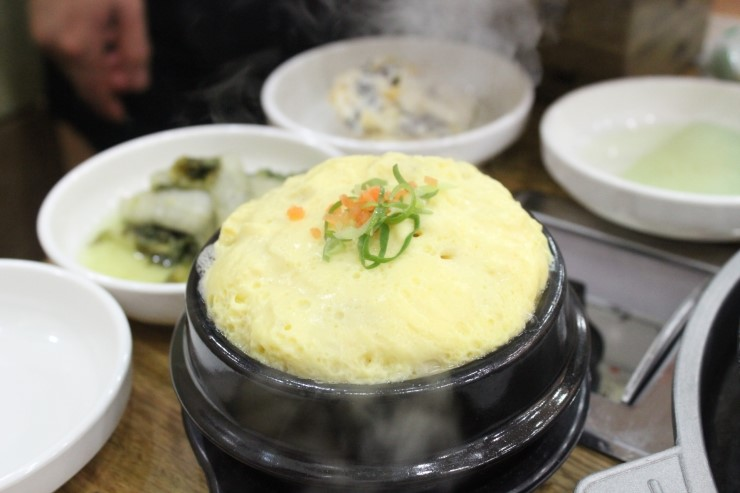
- Gyeran-jjim boiled in a ttukbaegi
- Alternative names: Steamed eggs
- Type: Jjim
- Course: Banchan
- Place of origin: Korea
- Cooking time: 15 minutes
- Main ingredients: Eggs
- Ingredients generally used: Saeu-jeot or myeongnan-jeot, scallions, toasted sesame seeds
- Similar dishes: Chawanmushi, Chinese steamed eggs

Korean name
- Hangul: 계란찜
- Hanja: 鷄卵찜
- RR: gyeranjjim
- MR: kyerantchim
- IPA: [kje.ɾan.t͈ɕim]

Gyeran-jjim (Korean: 계란찜), dalgyal-jjim (달걀찜) or steamed eggs is a type of jjim, Korean steamed dish. Commonly seen at Korean BBQ restaurants. It is a custardy, casserole-like banchan (side dish), often seasoned with saeu-jeot (salted shrimp) or myeongnan-jeot (salted pollock roe) and topped with scallions and toasted sesame seeds. The ideal gyeran-jjim is light and fluffy.

== Preparation and types ==
There are several ways to cook gyeran-jjim. It can be steamed, double-boiled, or boiled in a stovetop-safe crock on a very low heat. For faster cooking, some people microwave the bowl.

Eggs are sieved, and whisked with water until the mixture is completely blended in a cream-like consistency. Sometimes, kelp and/or anchovy broth is used in place of water for a richer flavor. Optional ingredients include mushrooms, peas, onions, Korean zucchini, carrots, and other vegetables for their own twist on the dish. The dish is then seasoned with saeu-jeot (salted shrimp), myeongnan-jeot (salted pollock roe), or salt, and optionally ground black pepper. Before being served, it is topped with chopped scallions or crown daisy greens, gochutgaru (chili flakes) or sil-gochu (shredded dry red chili), and toasted sesame seeds.

== Gallery ==
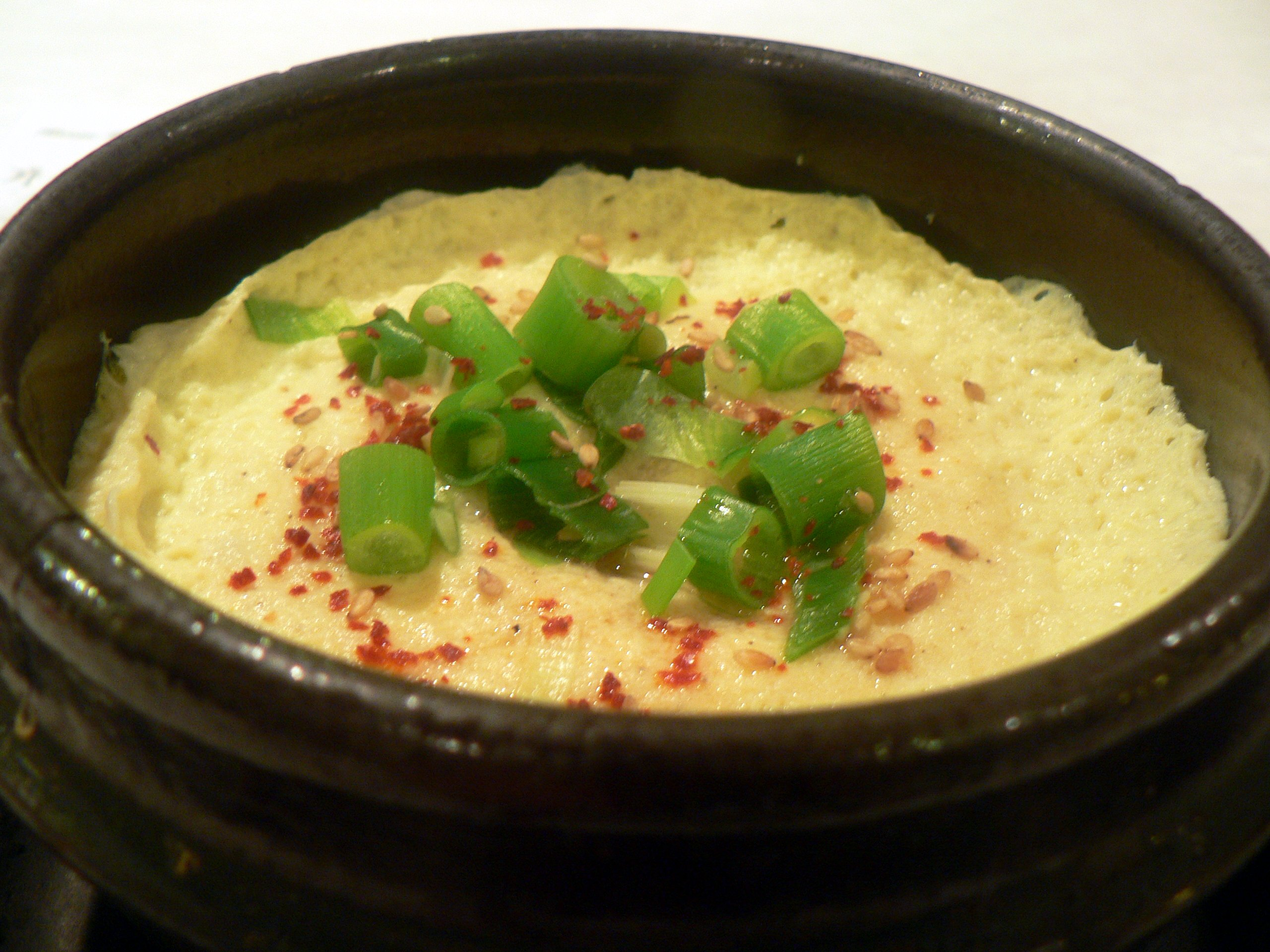

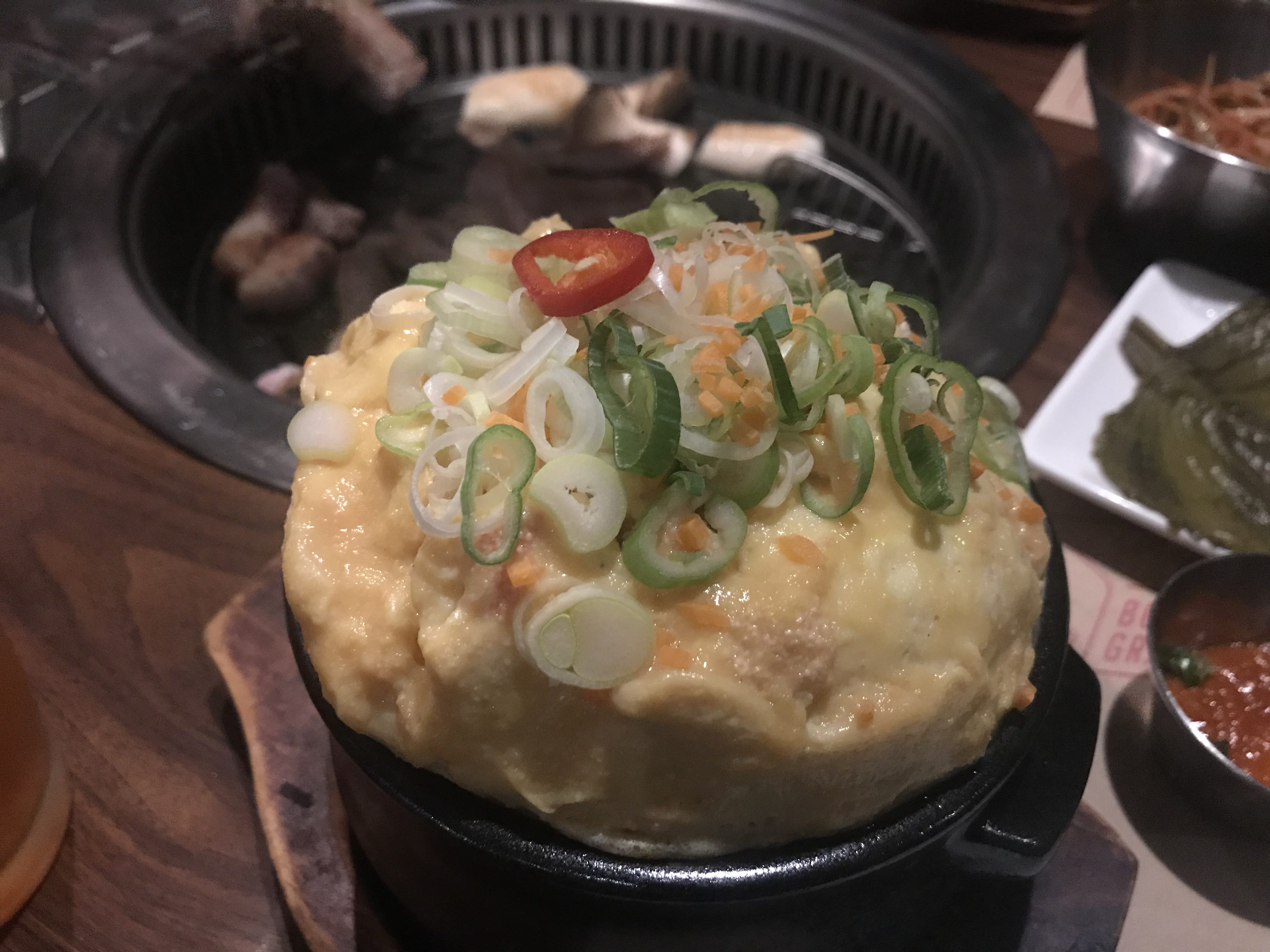

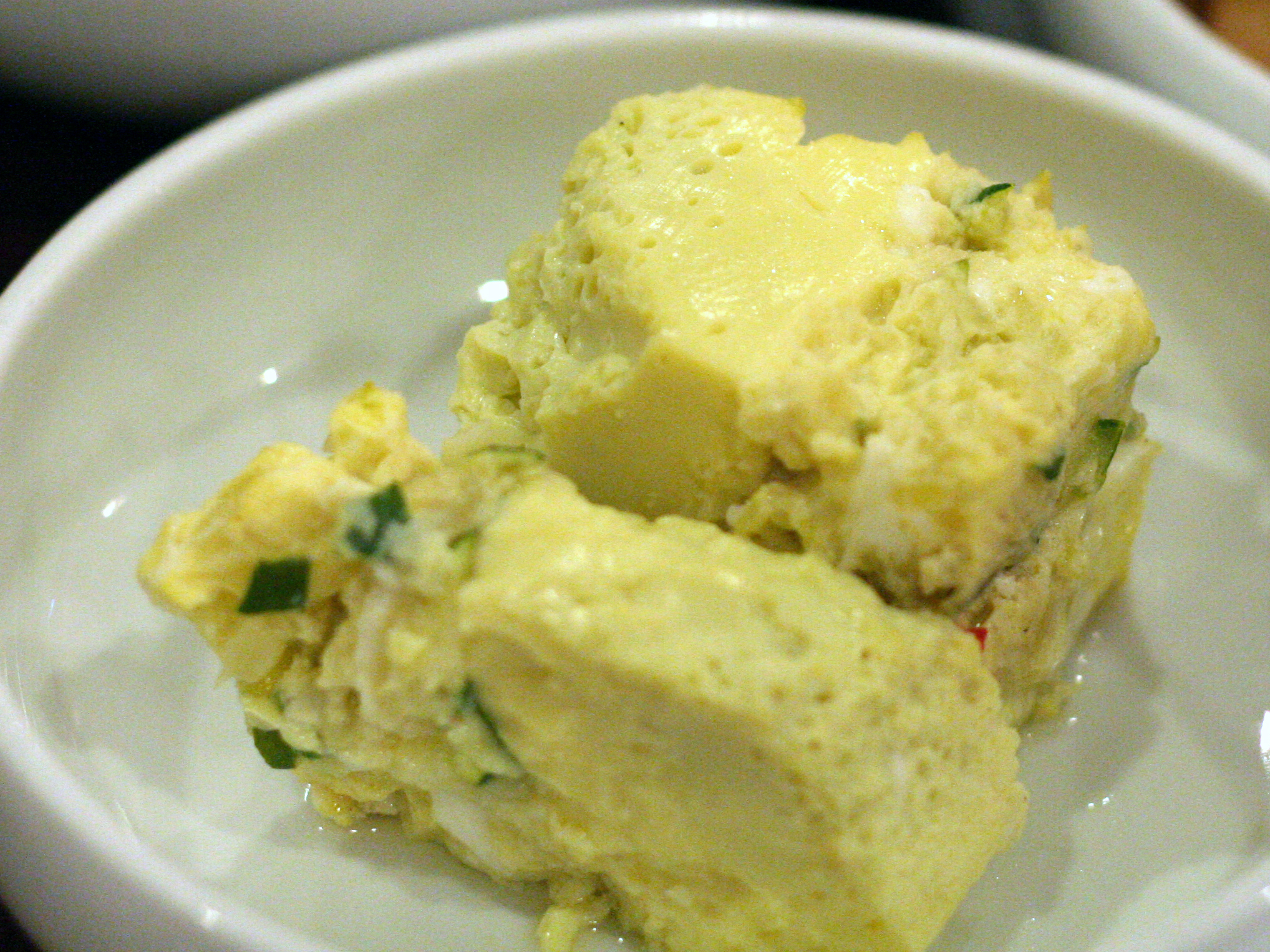

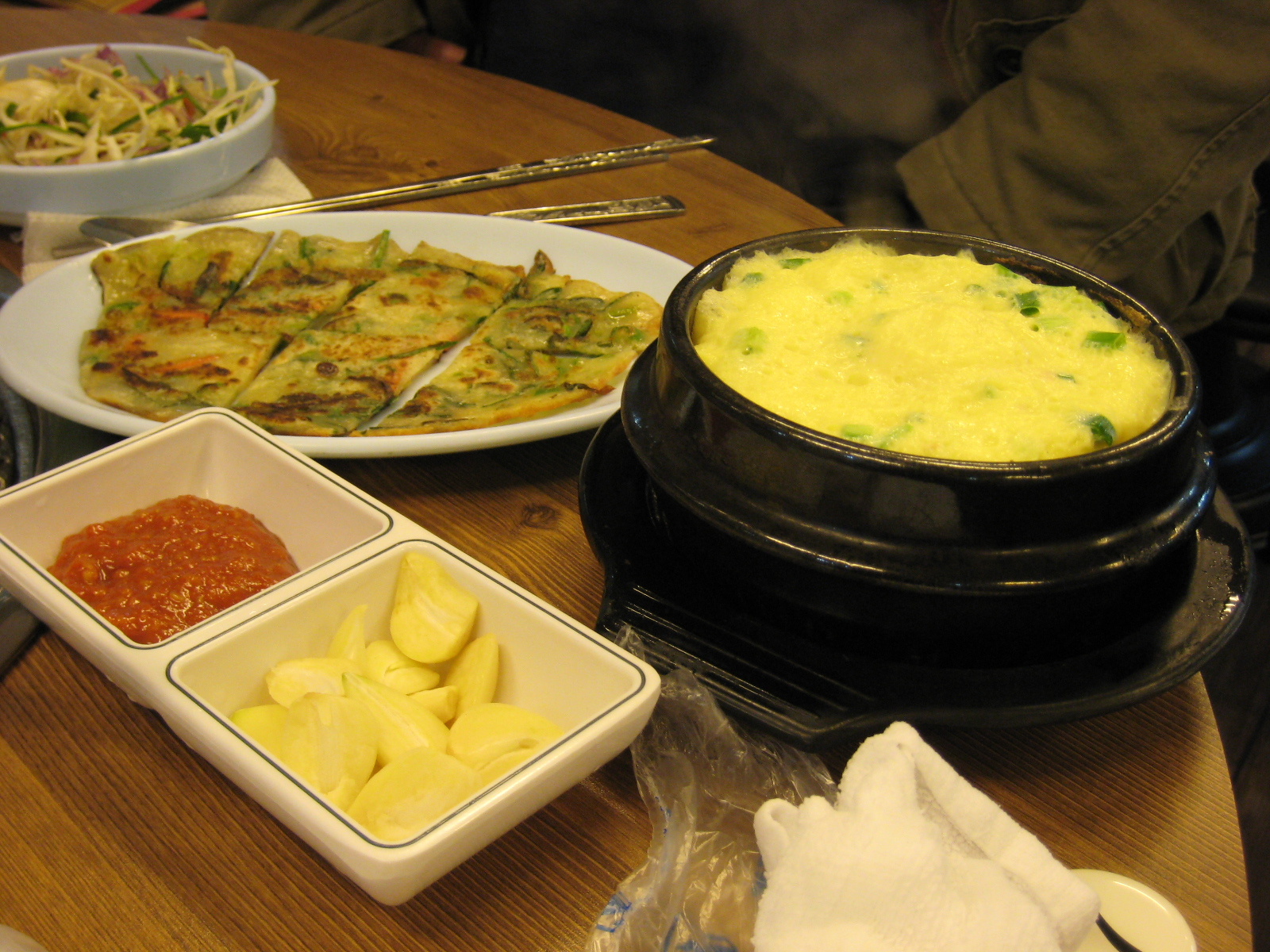
With pajeon

== See also ==
- Chawanmushi
- Chinese steamed eggs
- List of egg dishes
- List of Korean dishes
- List of steamed foods
