= Chawanmushi =

Japanese savoury egg custard dish

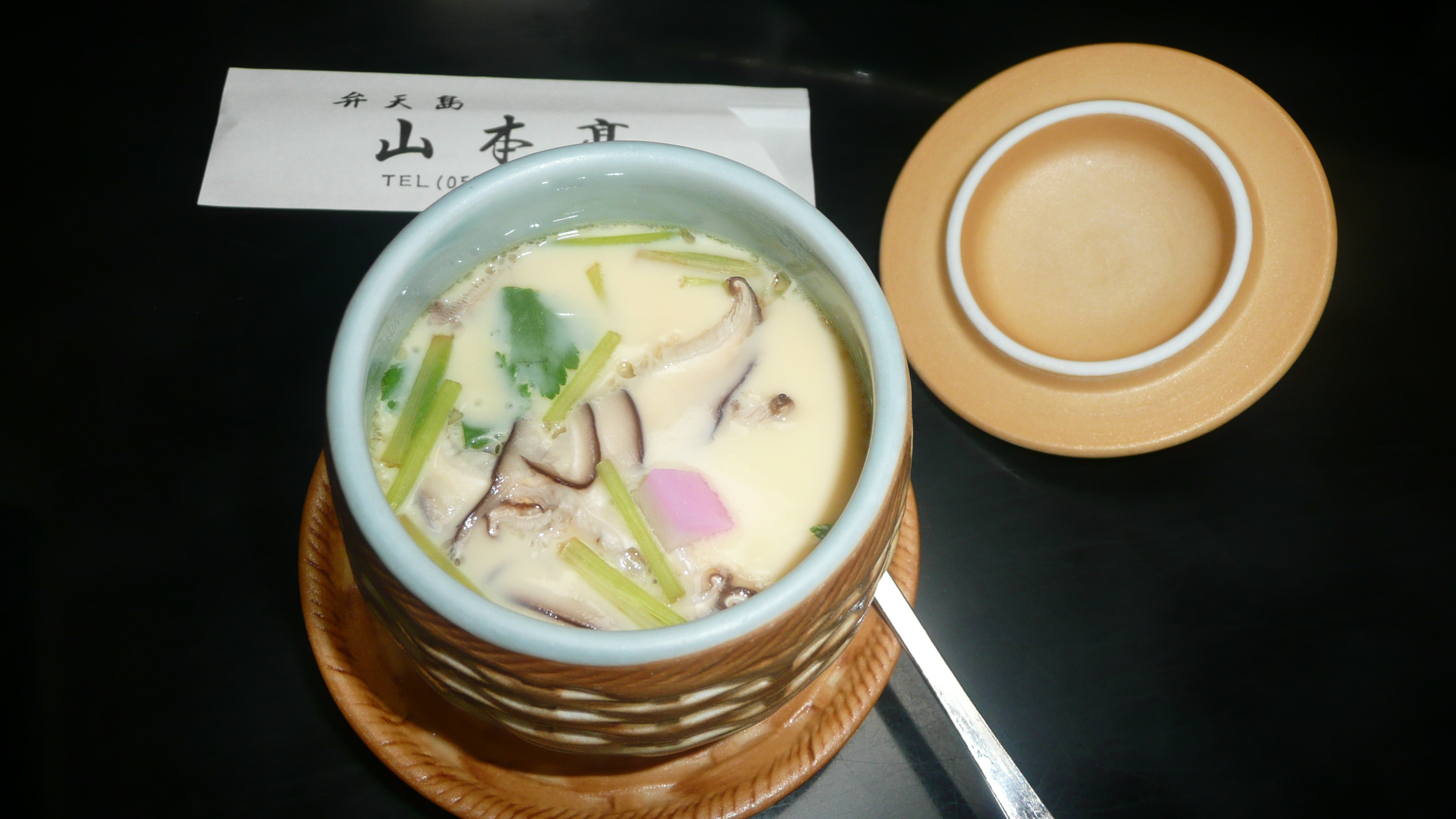
- Chawanmushi in a restaurant in Hamamatsu, Japan
- Place of origin: Japan
- Region or state: Japan and Japanese-speaking areas
- Main ingredients: Egg, ginkgo seeds, soy sauce, dashi, and mirin, shiitake mushrooms, kamaboko, lily root, boiled shrimp
- Variations: Chinese steamed eggs, gyeran jjim

Chawanmushi (茶碗蒸し, chawanmushi; literally "tea cup steam" or "steamed in a tea bowl") is a savoury egg custard dish in Japanese cuisine. Unlike many other custards, it is usually eaten as a dish in a meal, as chawanmushi contains savory rather than sweet ingredients. The custard consists of an egg mixture seasoned with soy sauce, dashi, and mirin, with numerous ingredients such as shiitake mushrooms, kamaboko, yuri-ne (lily root), ginkgo and boiled shrimp placed into a tea-cup-like container. The recipe for the dish is similar to that of Chinese steamed eggs, but the toppings often differ. Since egg custards cannot be picked up by chopsticks, it is one of the few Japanese dishes that are eaten with a spoon.

Chawanmushi can be eaten either hot or cool. When udon is added as an ingredient, it is called odamaki mushi or odamaki udon.

== Gallery ==
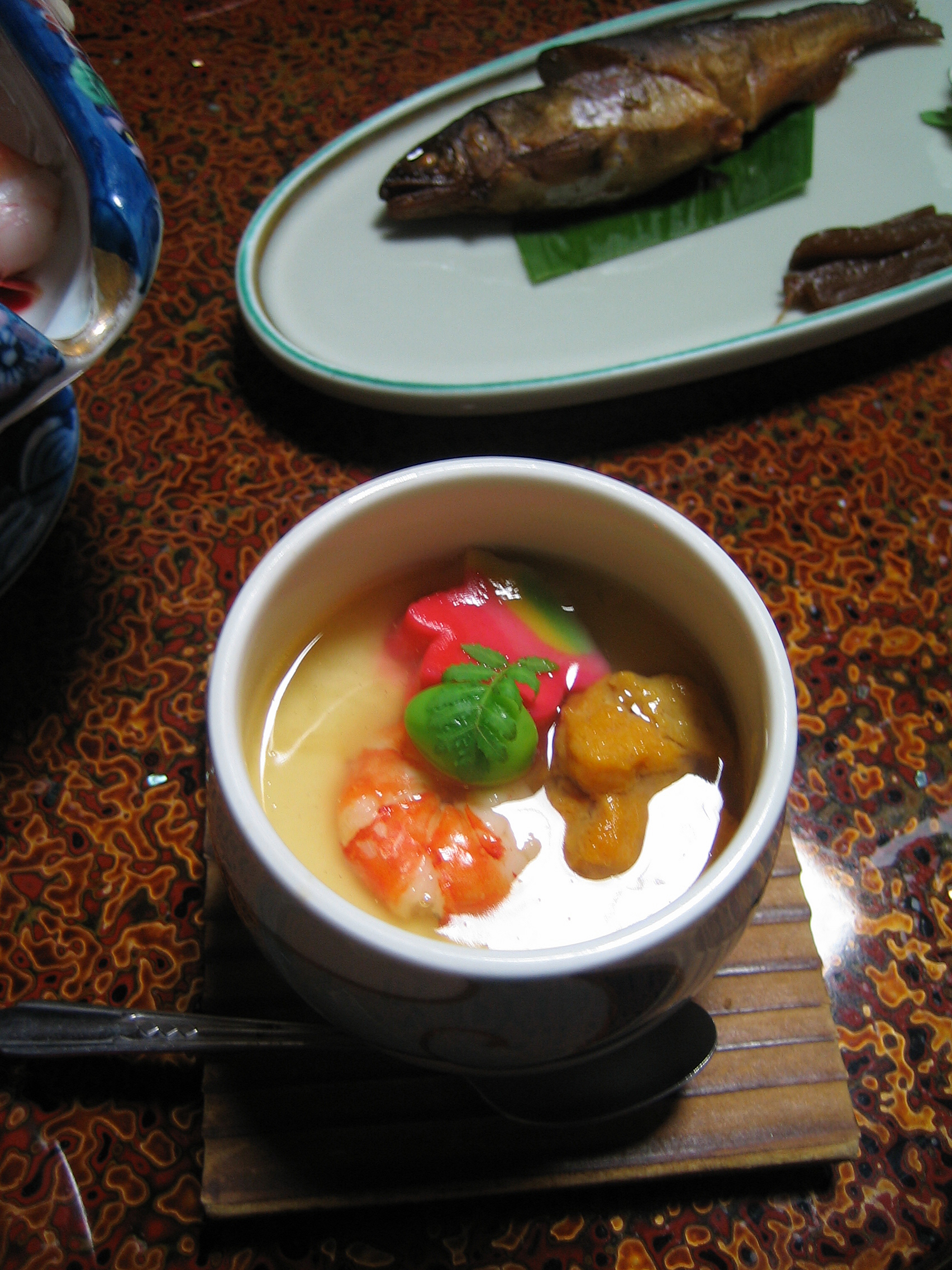

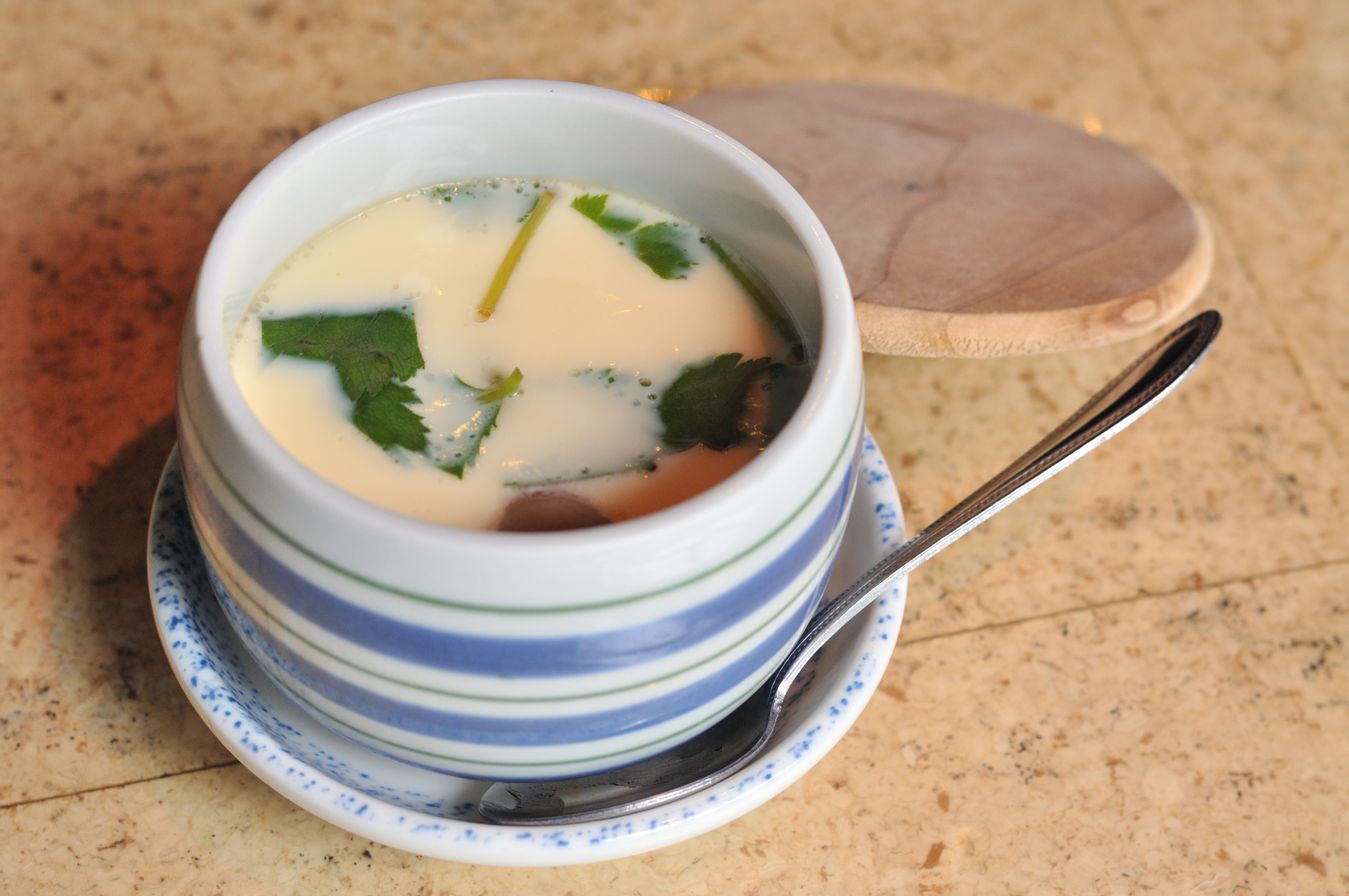

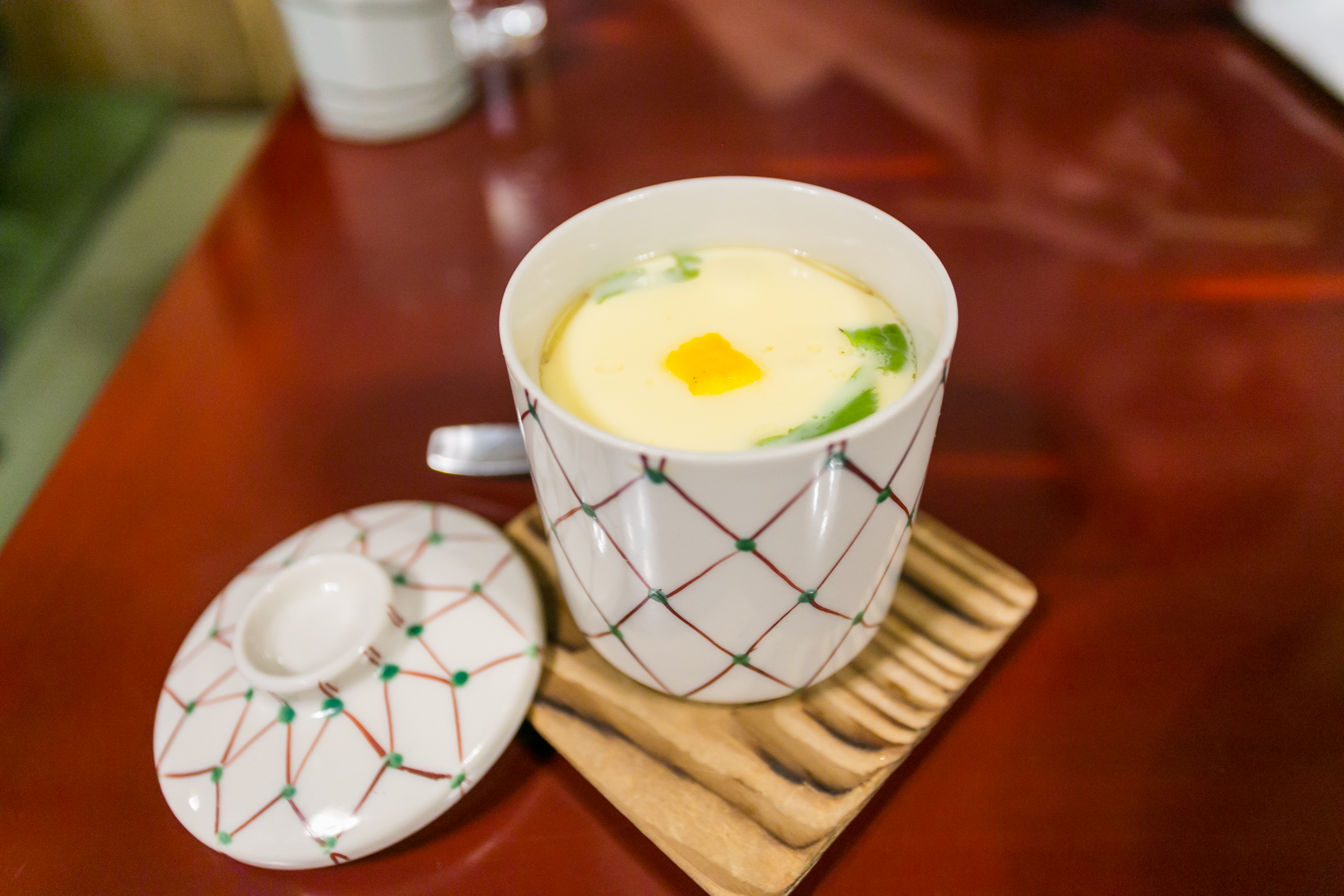

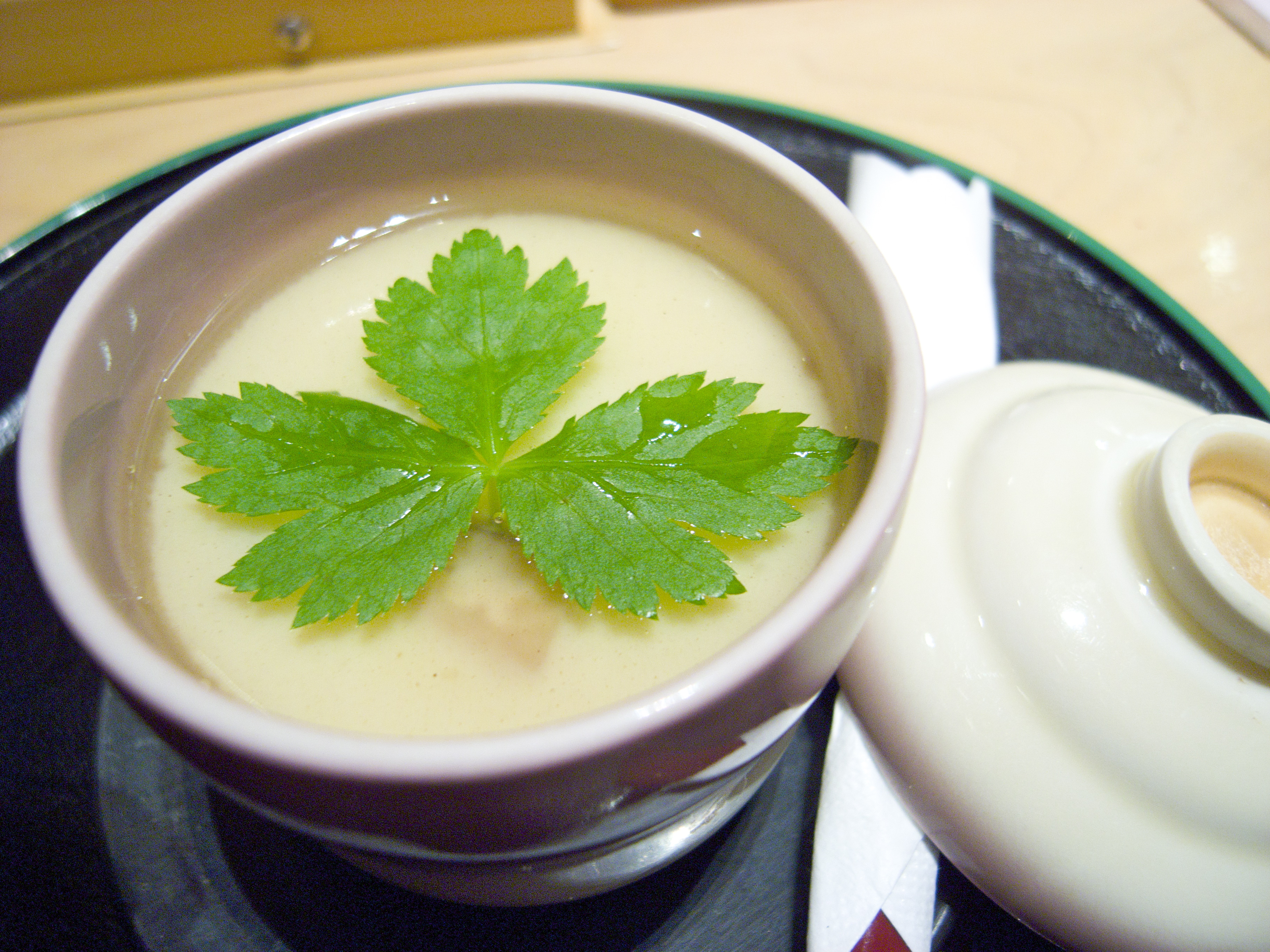
With mitsuba leaf

== See also ==
- Chinese steamed eggs
- Gyeran jjim
- List of hors d'oeuvre
- List of steamed foods
