= Tourism in Korea =

Tourism in Korea may refer to:

- Tourism in North Korea
- Tourism in South Korea
