= Tourism in South Korea =

Lotte World and Lotte World Tower

Tourism in South Korea and its industry caters to both foreign and domestic tourists. The country has 16 World Heritage Sites, including Changdeokgung Palace, Namhansanseong and Hwaseong Fortress. Seoul is the principal tourist destination for visitors. Popular tourist destinations outside of the capital include the major coastal city of Busan, the Seorak-san national park, the historic city of Gyeongju and subtropical Jeju Island.

== Tourism industry ==
Tourism has been encouraged by Korean government. The worldwide popularity of Korean popular culture, often known as the Korean Wave (i.e. Korean entertainment products such as Korean dramas and K-pop) has significantly increased tourist arrivals. Most non-Korean tourists come from East Asia and North America, such as China, Taiwan and the United States. In 2024, 16.37 million foreign tourists visited South Korea.

1,214,075The majority of the South Korean tourist industry is supported by domestic tourism. Thanks to the country's extensive network of trains and buses, most of the country lies within a day's round trip of any major city. International tourists come primarily from nearby countries or regions in Asia. Japan, mainland China, Hong Kong and Taiwan together account for roughly 75% of the total number of international tourists. In addition, the Korean Wave has brought increasing numbers of tourists from Southeast Asia and India. The Korea Tourism Organization (KTO) is targeting 100,000 arrivals from India in 2013.

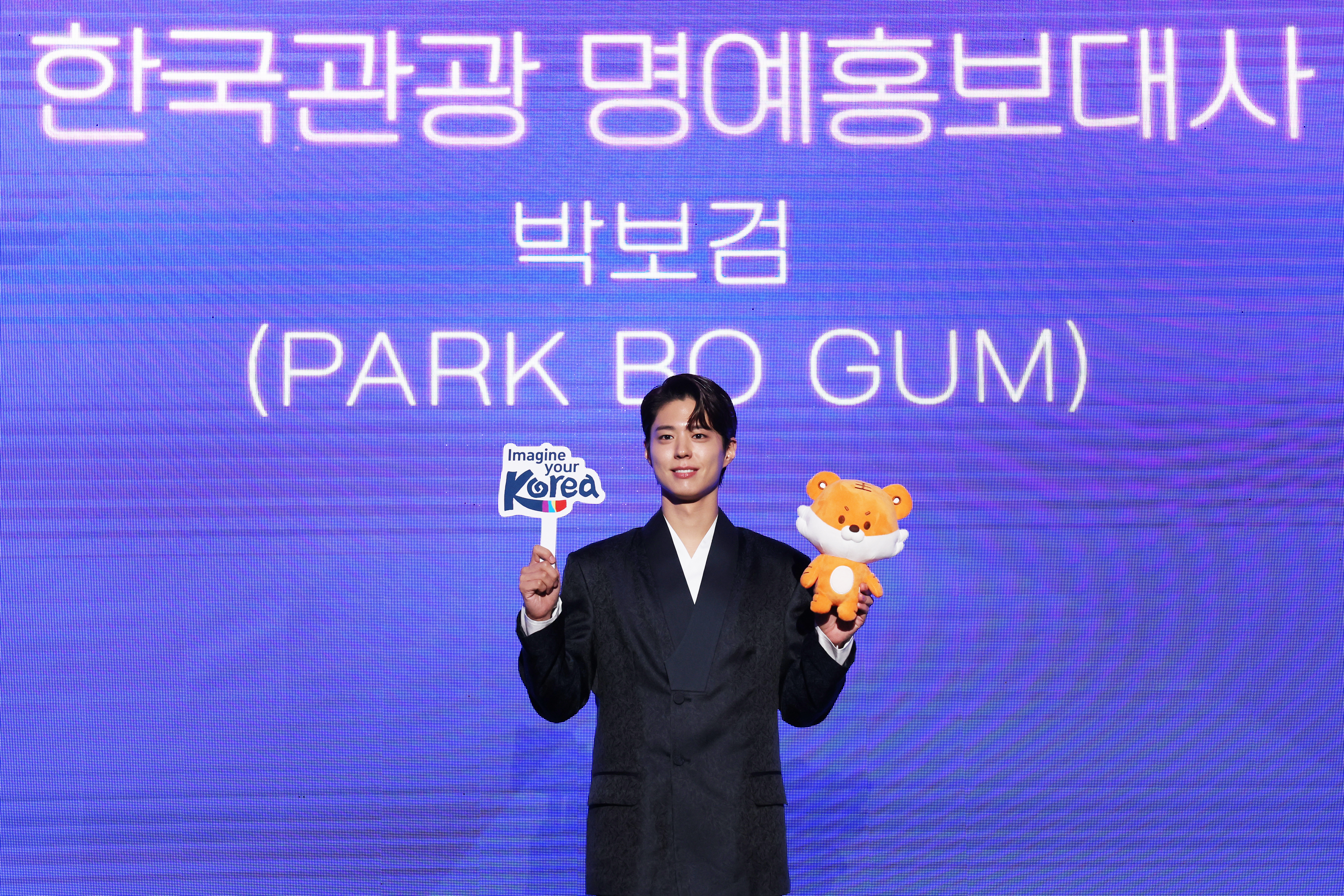
Actor Park Bo-gum at his appointment ceremony as honorary ambassador for South Korean tourism, July 2025

The Ministry of Culture, Sports and Tourism, together with the Korea Tourism Organization, appoints globally-known South Korean personalities as honorary ambassadors for their campaigns to promote South Korean tourism. They have included Korean Wave figures like boy group BTS, actor Lee Jung-jae, girl group NewJeans (2024), and actor Park Bo-gum (2025).

== Domestic tourism ==
According to the National Survey of Domestic Travel conducted by the Ministry of Culture, Sports and Tourism and the Korea Culture and Tourism Institute, Koreans made about 291.8 million domestic trips in 2024, covering both leisure and other purposes such as business and visiting relatives. In the same year, total domestic tourism expenditure reached ₩36.8 trillion.

Also, Korean overseas tourist numbers have been increasing since 2010. From 2012 to 2014, the number of South Koreans travelling overseas has risen by about 8.2% on average. In 2014, number of Korean overseas tourists was about 16.1 million. And Korean overseas tourism expenditure was $19,469.9 million.

== Statistics ==
Yearly tourist arrivals in millions

In 2019, the contribution of travel and tourism to the Korean GDP was up 4.2% of the total economy (₩ 81.4 billion). Which accounted for 4.8% of total employment (1.3%). The impact of international visitors accounted for ₩ 26.5 billion (World Travel and Tourism Council).

Spending habits include:

- Leisure spending 82% vs. Business spending 18%
- Domestic spending 55% vs. International spending 45%

=== Arrivals ===
Visitors arriving to South Korea for tourism by nationality:

Country	9/2026	2025	2024	2023	2022	2021	2020	2019	2018
China	5,473,078	5,480,969	4,603,273	2,019,424	227,358	170,215	686,430	6,023,021	4,789,512
Japan	3,118,815	3,653,137	3,224,079	2,316,429	296,867	15,265	430,742	3,271,706	2,948,527
Taiwan	1,864,368	1,891,414	1,473,908	960,607	72,925	4,130	166,716	1,260,493	1,115,333
United States	1,214,075	1,483,240	1,320,108	1,086,415	543,648	204,025	220,417	1,044,038	967,992
Hong Kong	546,275	623,149	571,418	403,984	61,195	1,258	88,878	694,934	683,818
Philippines	507,288	615,141	516,760	342,819	199,845	116,233	115,696	503,867	460,168
Vietnam	458,107	543,105	511,420	420,688	185,061	22,946	81,939	553,731	457,818
Indonesia	330,629	365,596	336,185	250,249	106,750	46,563	66,762	278,575	249,067
Singapore	276,899	399,635	375,428	347,814	165,272	7,525	18,009	246,142	231,897
Thailand	253,291	333,930	323,856	379,442	179,259	8,319	76,568	571,610	558,912
Canada	240,496	282,618	254,332	201,849	93,064	29,795	34,734	196,153	194,259
Malaysia	231,948	329,147	300,836	259,872	70,449	4,488	48,550	408,590	382,929
Australia	216,061	267,157	244,338	198,604	65,502	3,503	23,172	173,218	153,133
Russia	193,723	224,524	197,198	158,775	60,019	32,897	73,086	343,057	302,542
India	185,147	199,277	176,668	122,771	64,829	31,338	33,830	143,367	119,791
United Kingdom	161,243	171,940	147,493	121,376	44,806	8,974	20,419	143,676	130,977
France	155,456	180,076	164,508	133,406	62,619	15,700	19,371	110,794	100,096
Germany	154,092	175,836	157,185	132,720	65,107	20,038	22,254	120,730	115,789
Mongolia	132,561	166,901	141,902	135,216	62,670	5,769	21,476	113,599	113,864
Myanmar	105,101	86,290	76,334	56,717	65,957	56,728	43,406	73,722	71,094
Italy	76,780	81,328	63,423	47,631	18,138	4,091	6,455	52,894	46,546
Mexico	75,005	85,503	57,888	22,141	8,676	3,472	5,726	30,481	25,192
Turkey	63,009	60,202	46,027	31,748	18,051	5,323	6,560	31,293	29,558
Uzbekistan	59,013	67,900	59,501	52,480	36,195	13,674	15,773	88,276	82,984
Kazakhstan	58,809	64,990	54,893	46,874	30,273	7,212	10,240	52,966	52,859
Netherlands	55,418	62,695	55,038	49,225	25,651	13,434	12,521	39,138	37,134
Spain	53,958	59,134	47,031	34,508	14,367	2,719	3,649	30,656	27,314
Poland	52,772	54,297	43,539	29,192	11,732	4,114	5,563	23,913	21,971
Nepal	45,254	51,257	40,507	37,344	27,168	2,457	6,430	26,313	25,926
Cambodia	41,236	51,694	48,084	40,935	24,901	5,414	10,725	41,734	33,395
Brazil	35,578	41,607	33,292	22,854	8,609	1,683	3,954	23,788	19,745
New Zealand	33,409	44,632	42,177	39,956	15,722	1,660	6,598	38,954	34,205
Laos	29,476	28,062	19,569	11,911	4,168	379	1,450	12,816	11,924
Switzerland	28,015	29,215	25,819	20,217	8,069	1,496	1,884	17,847	18,103
Bangladesh	26,612	25,905	23,959	19,888	15,274	2,946	4,530	17,952	16,151
Sweden	25,350	25,135	20,837	18,974	7,455	1,525	2,188	19,709	19,503
Sri Lanka	22,830	29,368	27,666	21,404	15,437	4,057	5,070	18,338	17,901
Israel	22,215	24,949	14,789	13,425	6,266	1,039	1,445	17,102	15,328
Ukraine	20,820	23,506	22,414	15,976	13,305	14,206	11,568	27,667	25,608
Belgium	19,497	21,388	19,626	16,878	7,728	2,148	2,497	14,539	12,499
Romania	18,262	18,777	16,017	11,785	5,872	3,295	3,200	12,781	11,372
Denmark	18,021	17,814	15,730	13,564	6,138	1,396	2,059	13,453	12,044
South Africa	16,275	19,342	16,553	12,646	5,516	1,195	3,143	13,144	11,795
Portugal	16,043	17,466	13,919	9,536	3,827	1400	1,856	11,425	10,794
Norway	15,898	14,790	12,192	10,690	4,574	921	1,507	11,770	13,615
Austria	15,495	17,110	15,660	13,053	6,556	1,920	2,397	12,570	12,635
Colombia	14,725	15,820	11,374	6,643	2,654	570	975	7,384	5,876
Ireland	13,623	14,947	12,317	9,244	3,962	875	1,631	10,211	8,723
Finland	13,573	15,671	13,895	12,668	5,511	2,861	3,033	13,912	14,372
Czech Republic	13,492	13,138	10,681	8,808	3,118	726	2,536	11,527	10,759
Pakistan	12,535	15,321	15,842	12,197	9,511	2,564	3,603	13,721	14,188
Saudi Arabia	12,027	20,998	22,651	17,349	8,491	1,098	1,716	14,158	11,553
Kyrgyzstan	11,189	12,787	10,691	8,404	5,388	2,115	1,439	7,659	7,305
Greece	10,975	12,540	10,821	7,839	5,586	3,317	3,038	9,756	9,290
Argentina	9,010	9,849	7,236	4,883	1,691	354	969	5,153	4,832
Hungary	8,627	9,138	8,843	7,413	3,356	998	1,154	6,178	4,754
Ethiopia	8,197	9,781	10,813	8,209	4,895	3,686	3,004	7,107	4,280
Chile	7,229	8,755	7,035	6,050	1,944	254	1,035	5,944	5,149
Bulgaria	6,958	7,756	6,494	4,547	3,176	1,833	1,651	6,536	6,079
Peru	6,805	7,490	5,623	4,718	1,386	258	760	4,745	4,140
Croatia	6,063	7,052	6,112	3,928	2,469	1,594	2,047	5,962	6,083
Tajikistan	6,183	6,790	6,120	5,846	3,619	1,405	828	4,489	2,863
Lithuania	5,774	5,894	4,622	3,162	1,541	445	512	2,671	2,490
United Arab Emirates	5,154	9,243	8,946	7,402	4,736	1,429	1,460	13,226	11,427
Egypt	5,120	7,117	6,454	5,643	3,773	1,907	1,507	5,833	7,630
Brunei	4,962	8,069	7,212	6,700	1,447	112	723	6,795	4,876
Morocco	4,280	5,662	4,690	3,944	2,486	737	1,085	5,009	4,284
Total	17,110,477	18,936,562	16,369,629	11,031,665	3,198,017	967,003	2,519,118	17,502,756	15,346,879

=== Total tourist numbers ===
Year	Number of international visitor arriving in S. Korea	% change from previous year
2003	4,752,762	-11.1
2004	5,818,138	+22.4
2005	6,022,752	+3.5
2006	6,155,046	+2.2
2007	6,448,240	+4.8
2008	6,890,841	+6.9
2009	7,817,533	+13.4
2010	8,797,658	+12.5
2011	9,794,796	+11.3
2012	11,140,028	+13.7
2013	12,175,550	+9.3
2014	14,201,516	+16.6
2015	13,231,651	-6.8
2016	17,241,823	+30.3
2017	13,335,758	-22.7
2018	15,346,879	+15.1
2019	17,502,756	+14.0
2020	2,519,118	-85.6
2021	967,003	-61.6
2022	3,198,017	+230.71
2023	11,031,665	+244.95
2024	16,369,629	+48.4

==== China ====
Chinese tourists to South Korea and year-on-year rate. From March 2017, tourists plummeted in retaliation for the installation of THAAD.

China has been South Korea's largest tourism source for years. In 2016, visitors from China made up 46.8% of tourists in South Korea. However China imposed a group tour ban after the US military deployed the Terminal High Altitude Area Defense (THAAD) system in South Korea. From April 2017, Chinese tourists plummeted by more than 60% compared to the previous year. In 2020, the South Korean tourism industry made it a long-term goal to reduce its dependency on Chinese tourists.

==== Japan ====
Japan–South Korea tourist comparison from 2005

Since Lee Myung-bak's visit to the Liancourt Rocks and his demand for an apology from the Emperor of Japan over Japanese colonialism in Korea in 2012, the Japanese public's image of South Korea deteriorated significantly. Japanese tourists to South Korea halved from 3.5 million in 2012 to 1.8 million in 2015, while South Korean tourists to Japan doubled from 2 million in 2012 to 4 million in 2015.

=== Domestic tourism ===
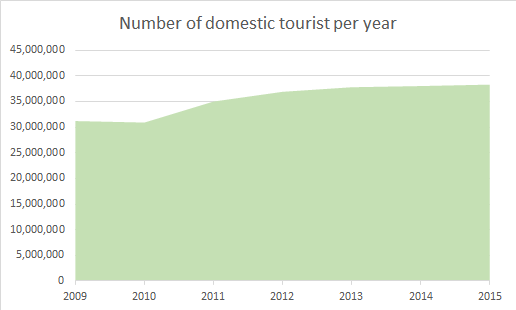

Year	Number of domestic tourist per year
2015	38,307,303
2014	38,027,454
2013	37,800,004
2012	36,914,067
2011	35,013,090
2010	30,916,690
2009	31,201,294

=== Destinations in Korea ===
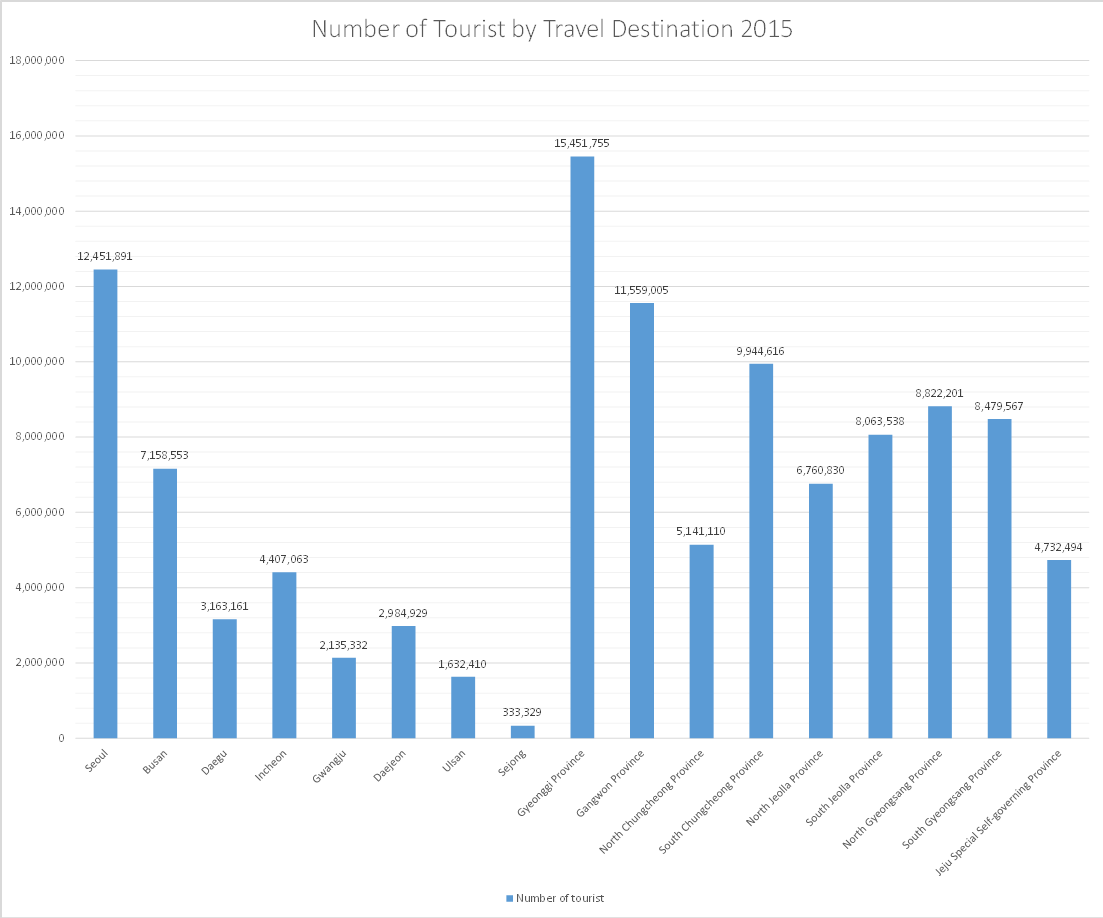

South Korea's historical tourist attractions include the ancient capitals of Seoul, Gyeongju and Buyeo.

Some natural landmarks include the peaks of the Baekdudaegan, particularly Seorak-san and Jiri-san, the caves of Danyang and Hwanseongul, and beaches such as Haeundae and Mallipo.

Apart from Jeju island, there are many smaller islands. Excursion ferries are quite common along the south and west coasts and also to Ulleung-do Island, off the east coast. Limited tourism mainly by South Koreans to the Liancourt Rocks (Dokdo) has grown in recent years as a result of the political status of the rocks.

Many local districts hold annual festivals, such as the Boryeong Mud Festival and the Cheongdo Bullfighting Festival.

Number of Tourist by Travel Destination 2015
Administrative divisions	Number of tourist
Seoul	12,451,891
Busan	7,158,553
Daegu	3,163,161
Incheon	4,407,063
Gwangju	2,135,332
Daejeon	2,984,929
Ulsan	1,632,410
Sejong	333,329
Gyeonggi Province	15,451,755
Gangwon Province	11,559,005
North Chungcheong Province	5,141,110
South Chungcheong Province	9,944,616
North Jeolla Province	6,760,830
South Jeolla Province	8,063,538
North Gyeongsang Province	8,822,201
South Gyeongsang Province	8,479,567
Jeju Special Self-governing Province	4,732,494

=== Major tourist destinations ===
==== Seoul ====
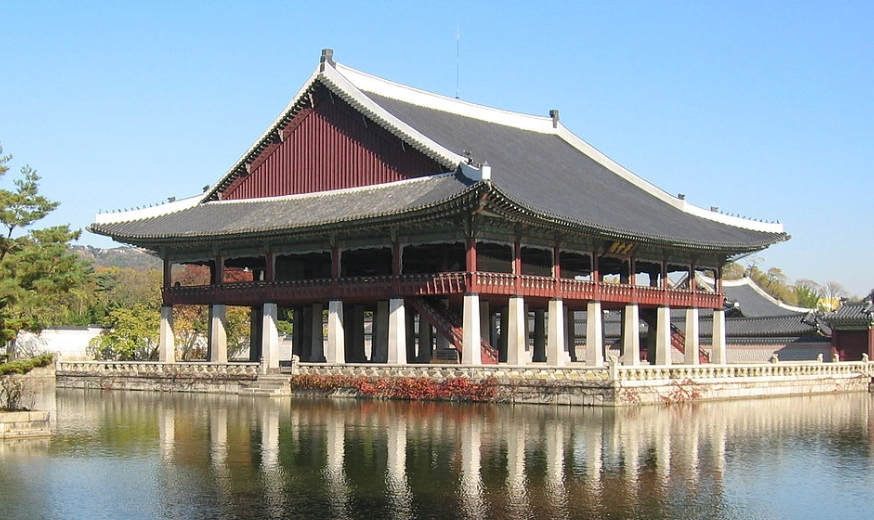
Gyeongbokgung Palace

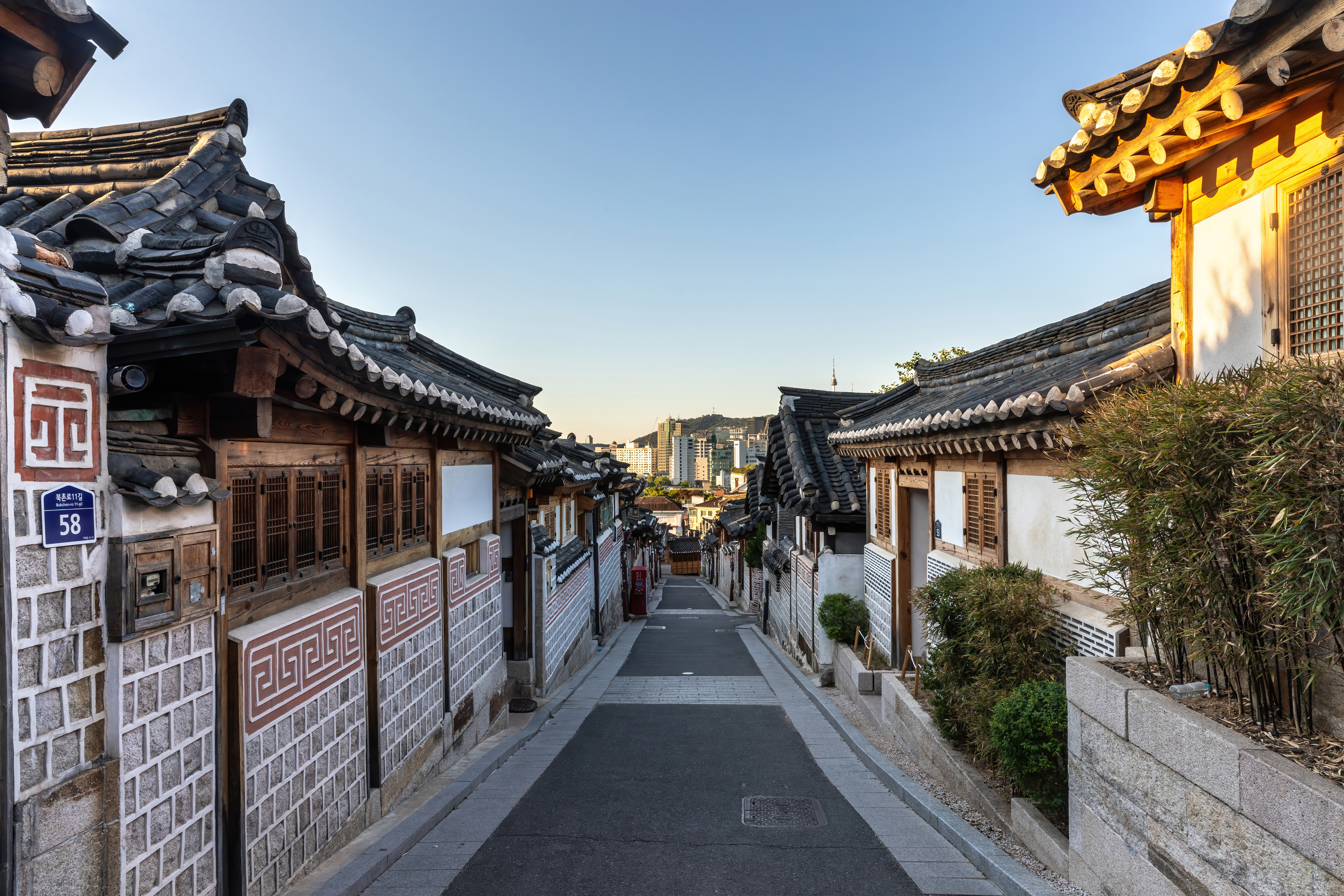
Bukchon Hanok Village

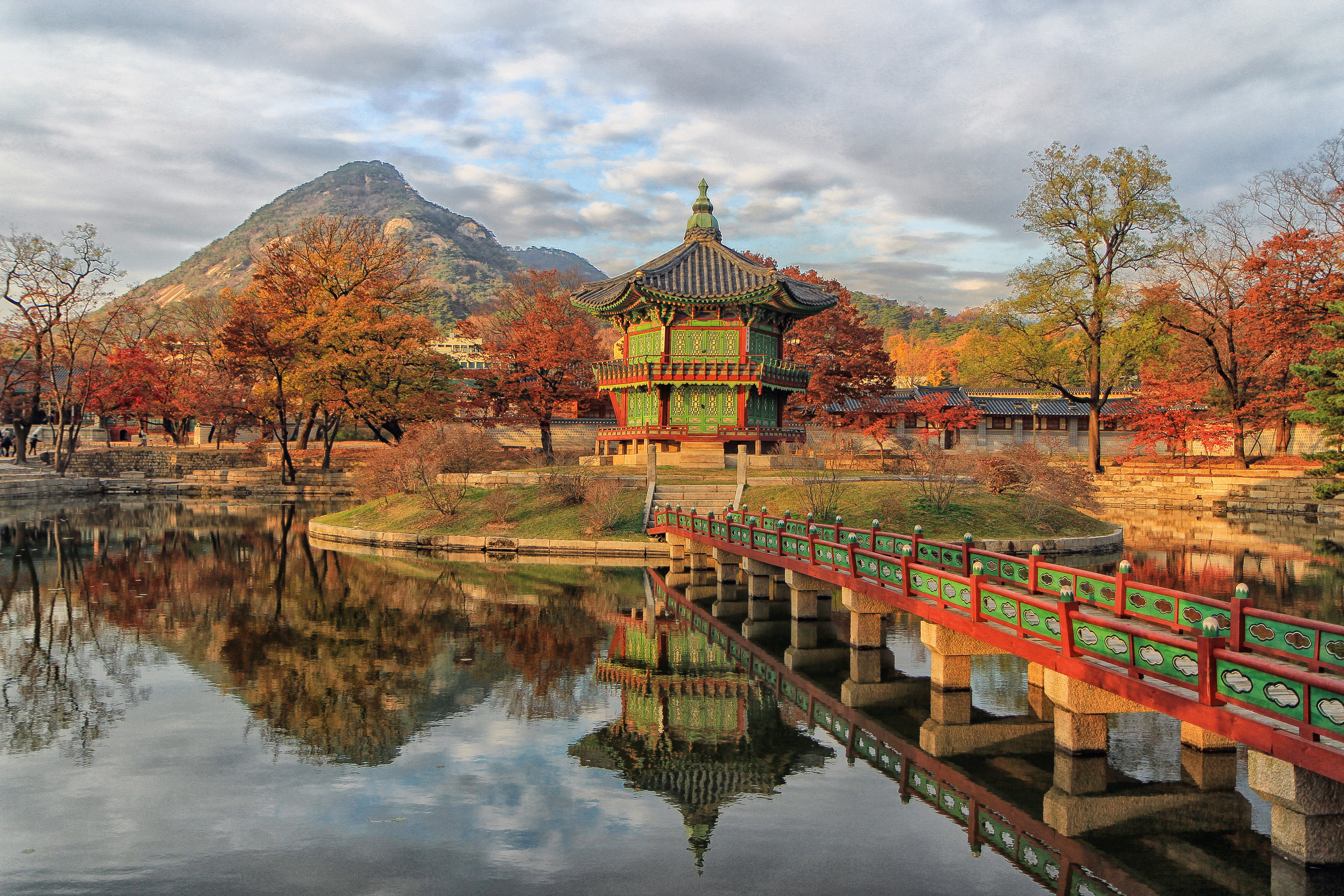
Hyangwonjeong Pavilion in Gyeongbokgung Palace

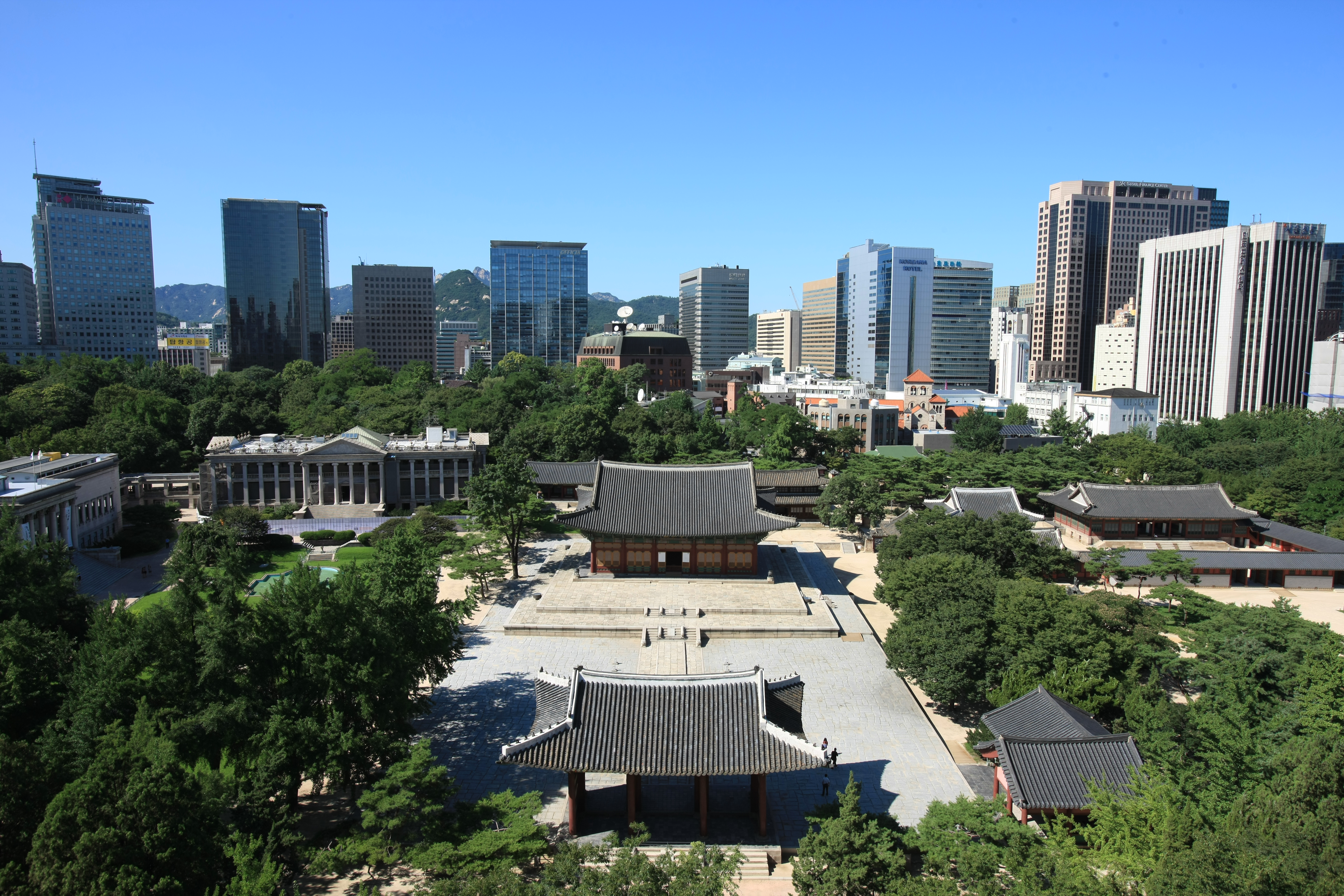
Deoksugung Palace

In addition, people in South Korea come to Seoul to enjoy various cultural activities. Due to the metropolitan area centralization of the cultural infrastructure, there is a cultural gap between Seoul and other regions. According to the Ministry of Culture, Sports and Tourism, 36.4 percent of the total cultural infrastructure such as public library, museum, and art galleries are concentrated in Seoul. Therefore, many people in South Korea travel to Seoul.

- Gyeongbokgung Palace
- Changdeokgung Palace
- Deoksugung Palace
- Gwanghwamun Square
- Fortress Wall of Seoul
- 63 Building
- N Seoul Tower
- Bukchon Hanok Village
- War Memorial of Korea
- Jogyesa Temple
- National Museum of Korea
- Cheonggyecheon

The Seoul Trail is a walking trail that goes around the city.

==== Busan ====
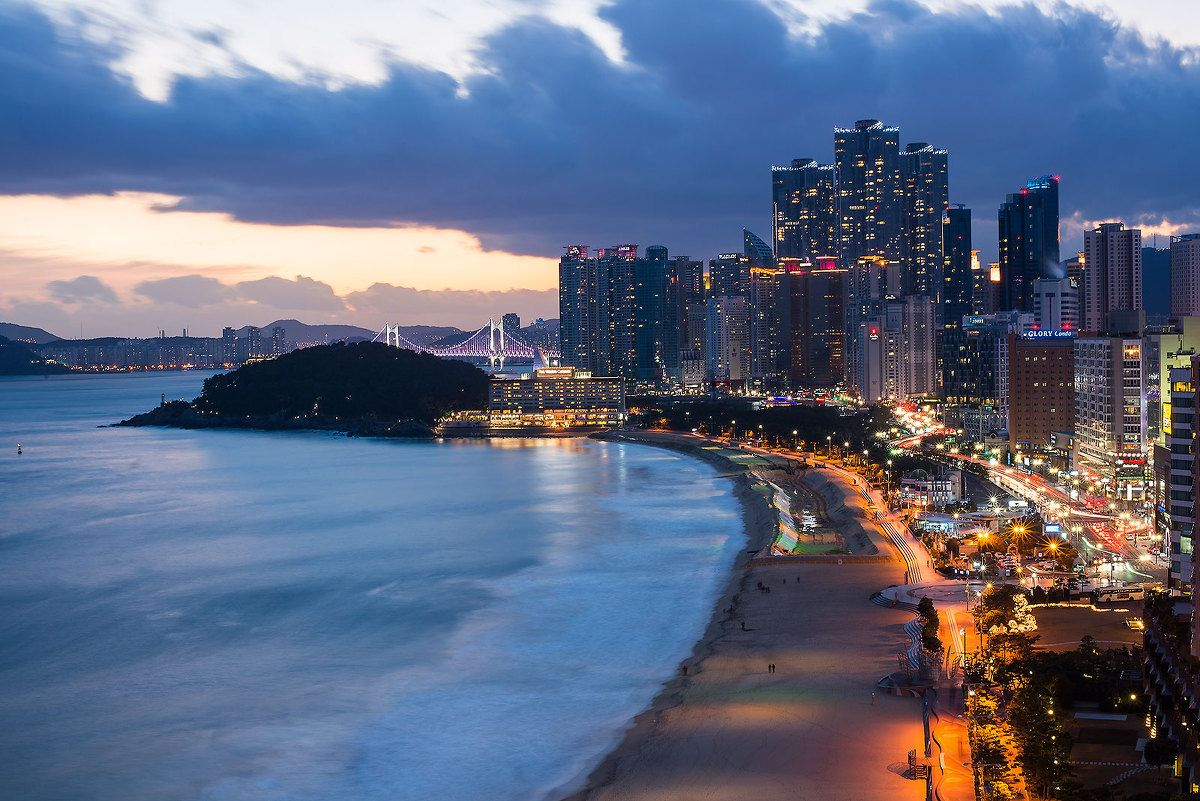
Haeundae Beach in Busan

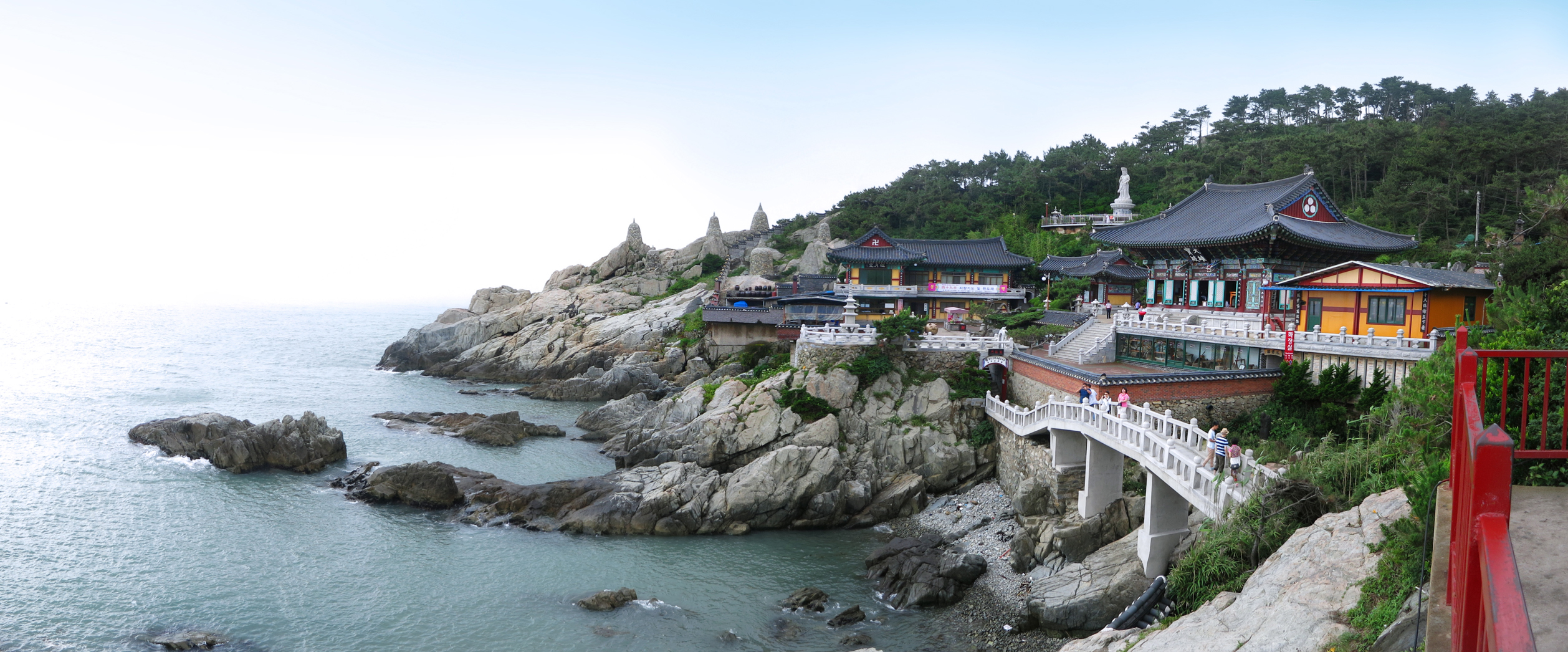
Haedong Yonggungsa

Busan is the second largest city in South Korea. It is located in the southeastern coast in Korea, so Busan has abundant tourist attractions such as beach and hot spring. People in South Korea visit beaches in Busan in hot summer. Also, there are various festivals in Busan. 11 festivals are held annually, including local festivals and art events. Busan sea festival is held every August and Busan International Film Festival is held every October. Jagalchi Cultural Festival is developed into a representative cultural tourism festival in Korea. Because of these various festivals and places, many people travel to Busan. Also, the influence of Social Network Service made Busan a popular tourist attraction. The official Facebook of the Busan Culture and Tourism Ministry and official blog sites promote the tourist attractions in Busan.

- Haeundae Beach
- Beomeosa Temple
- Haedong Yonggungsa Temple
- Geumjeongsanseong Fortress
- Dongnaeeupseong Fortress
- Dongnae-hyangyo Confucian Academy
- Chungnyeolsa Shrine
- Gukje Market
- Dongbaekseom

==== Daegu ====
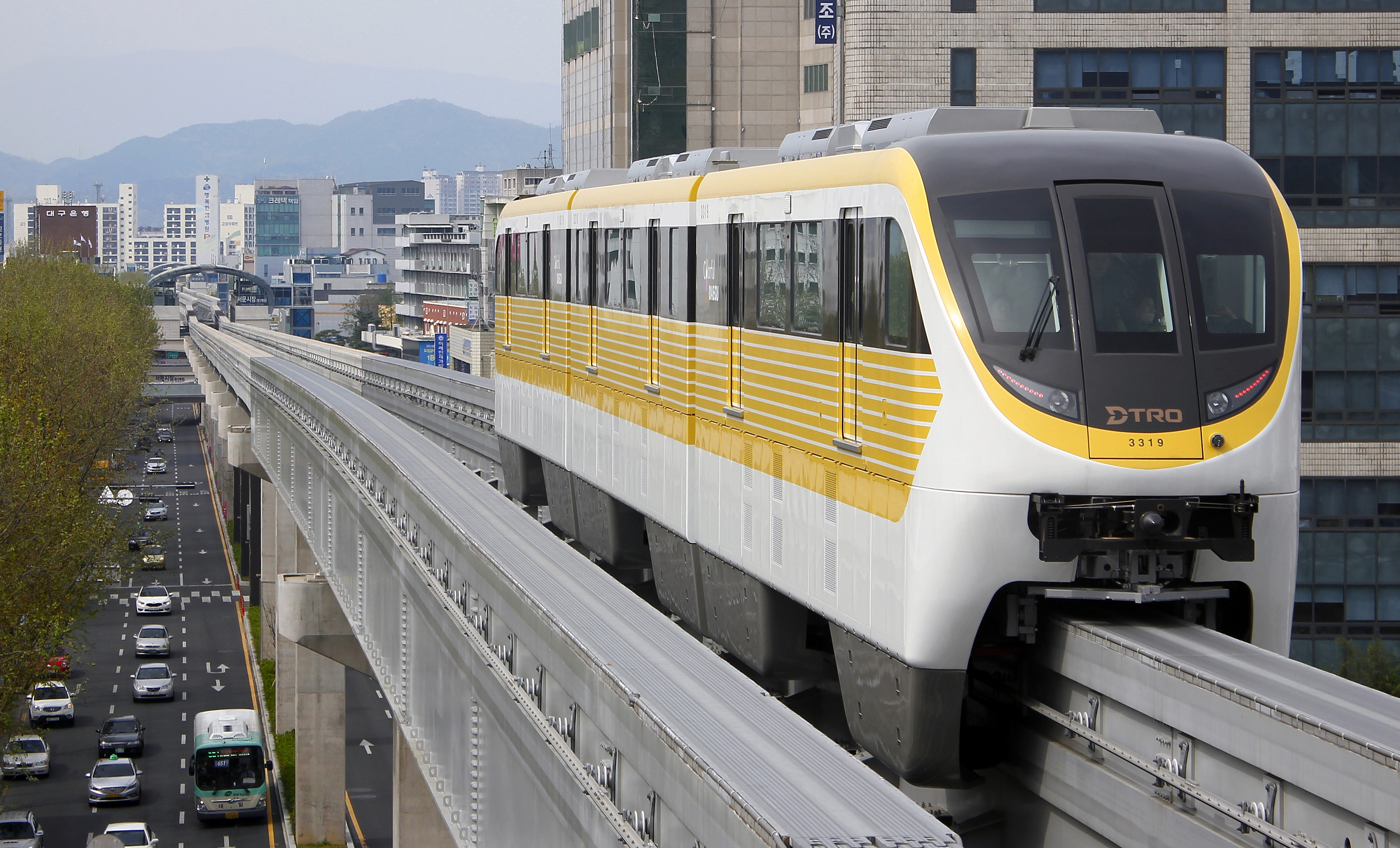
Daegu Metro Line 3

- Palgongsan Mountain
- Donghwasa Temple
- Cathedral of Our Lady of Lourdes in Daegu
- Dalseong Park
- Gyeongsang-gamyeong Park
- Old House of Lee Sang-hwa
- Daegu-hyanggyo Confucian Academy

==== Incheon ====
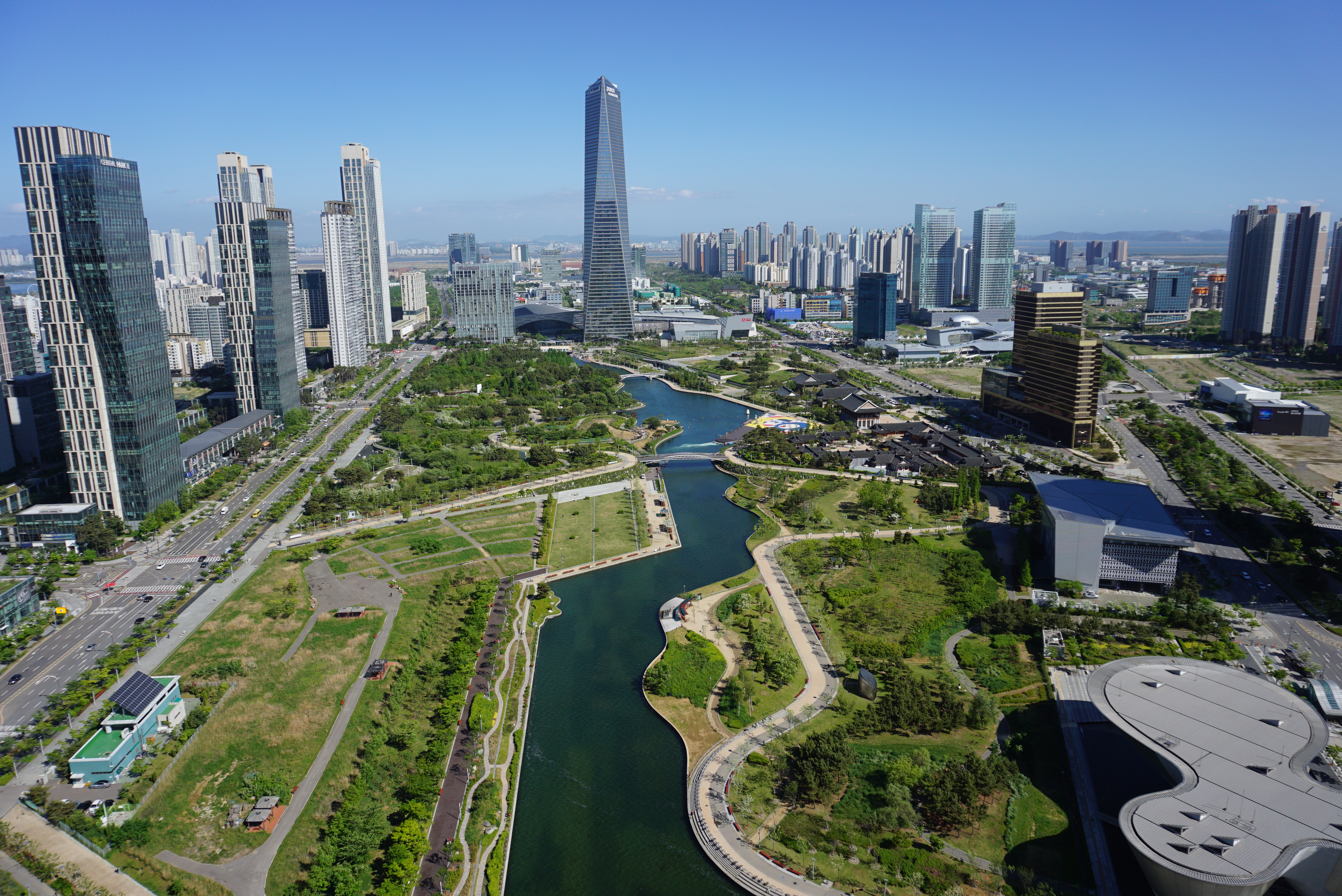
Songdo in Incheon

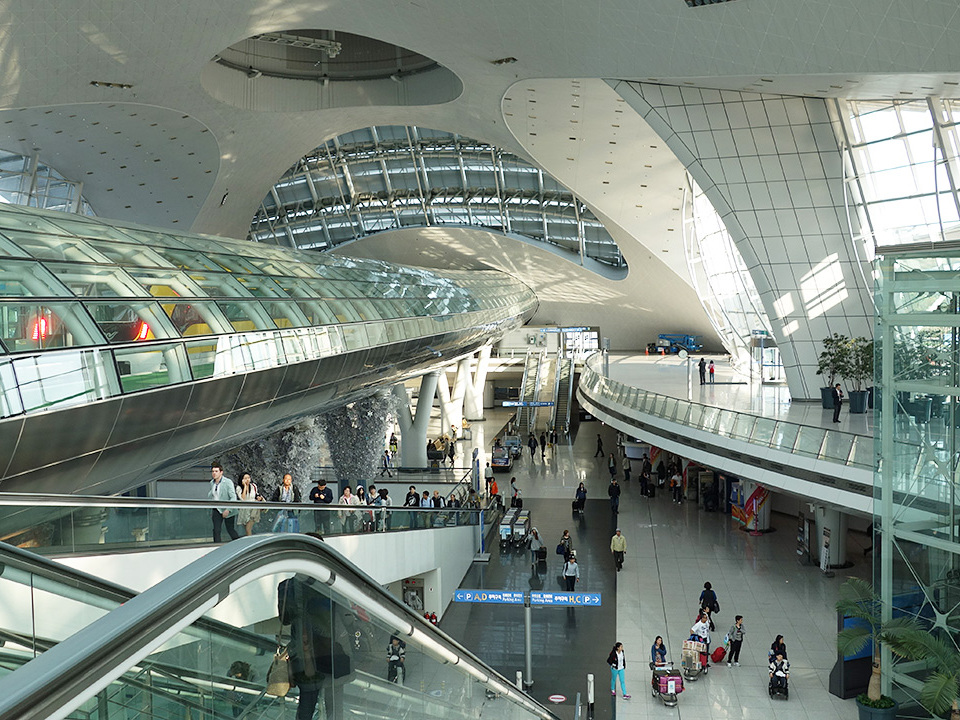
Incheon International Airport

- Songdo Central Park
- Jeondeungsa Temple
- Chamseongdan Altar
- Chinatown
- Wolmido Island
- Gwangseongbo Fortress

==== Gwangju ====
- May 18th National Cemetery
- Mudeungsan National Park
- Gwangju Folk Museum
- Gwangju National Museum
- Jeungsimsa Temple

==== Daejeon ====
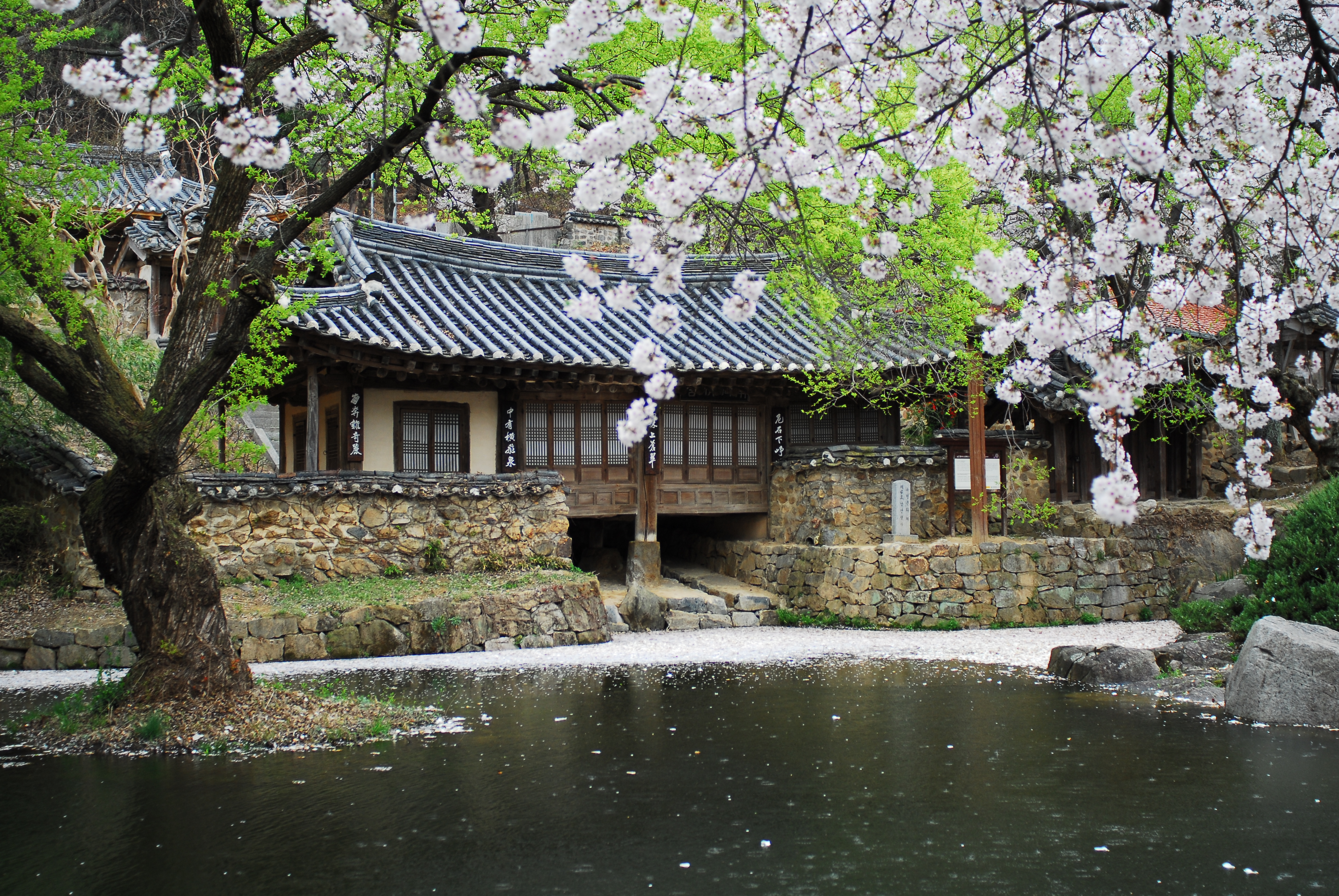
Uam Historic Park

- Hanbat Arboretum
- Yuseong Hot Springs
- Expo Park
- Daejeon Museum of Art

==== Gyeonggi Province ====
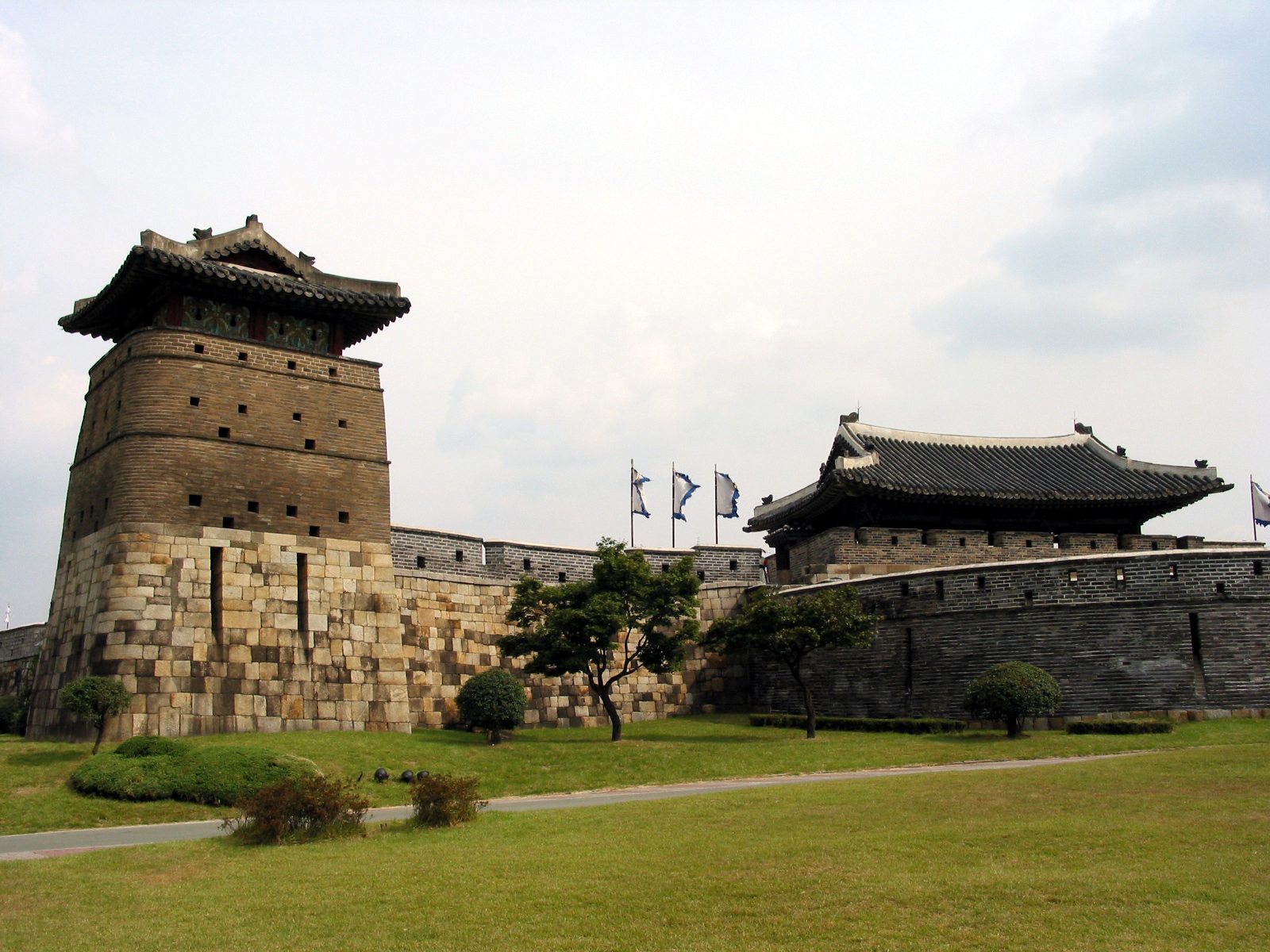
Hwaseong Fortress in Suwon

- Suwon — Suwon Hwaseong Fortress
- Gwangju (Gyeonggi) — Namhansanseong Fortress
- Kuri — Donggureung Tomb Cluster
- Paju — DMZ, Panmunjeom
- Yongin — Everland, Korean Folk Village, Yongin Daejanggeum Park
- Gapyeong — The Garden of Morning Calm
- Chuncheon — Legoland Korea Resort

==== Gangwon Province ====
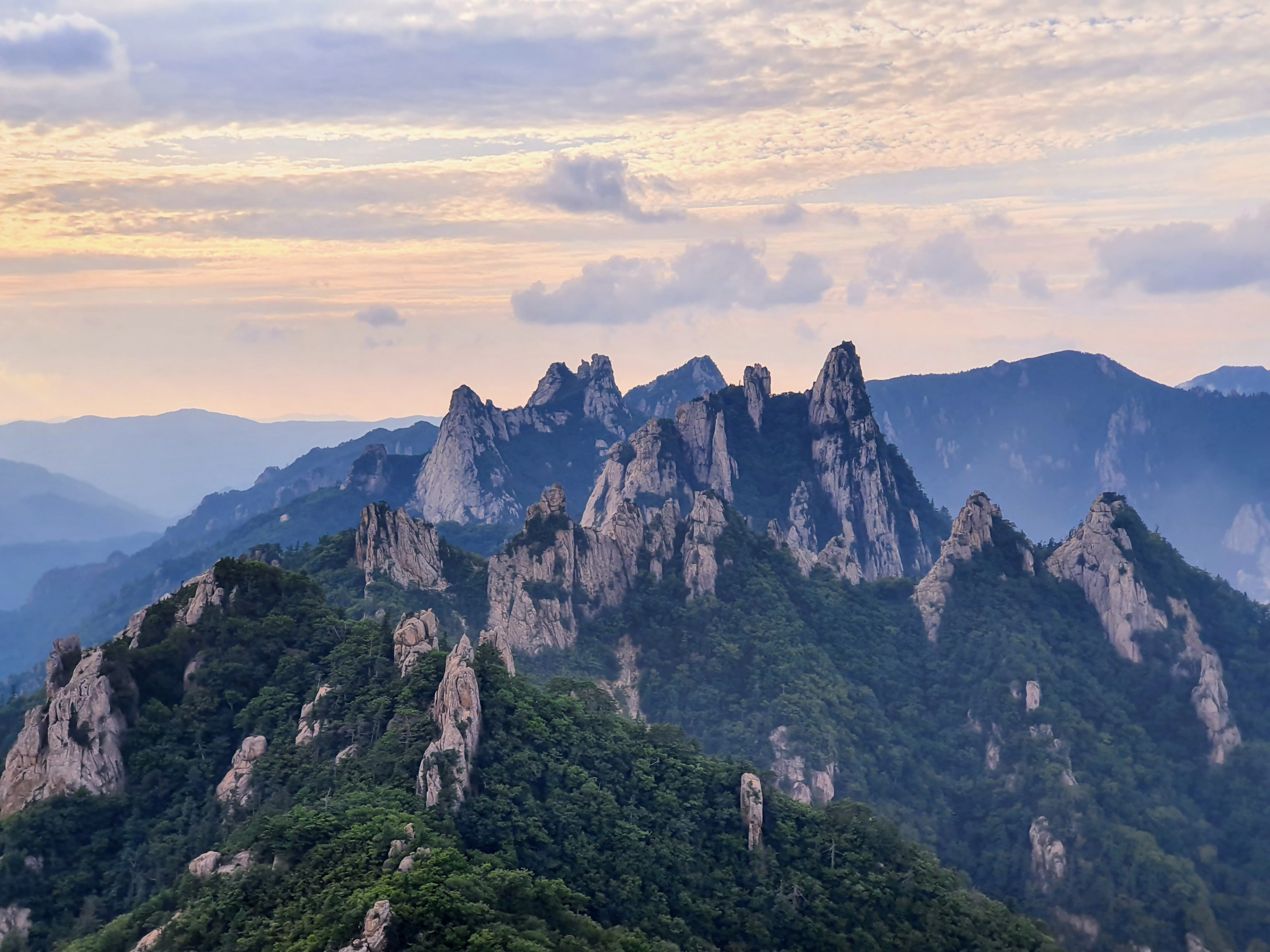
Seoraksan in Gangwon Province

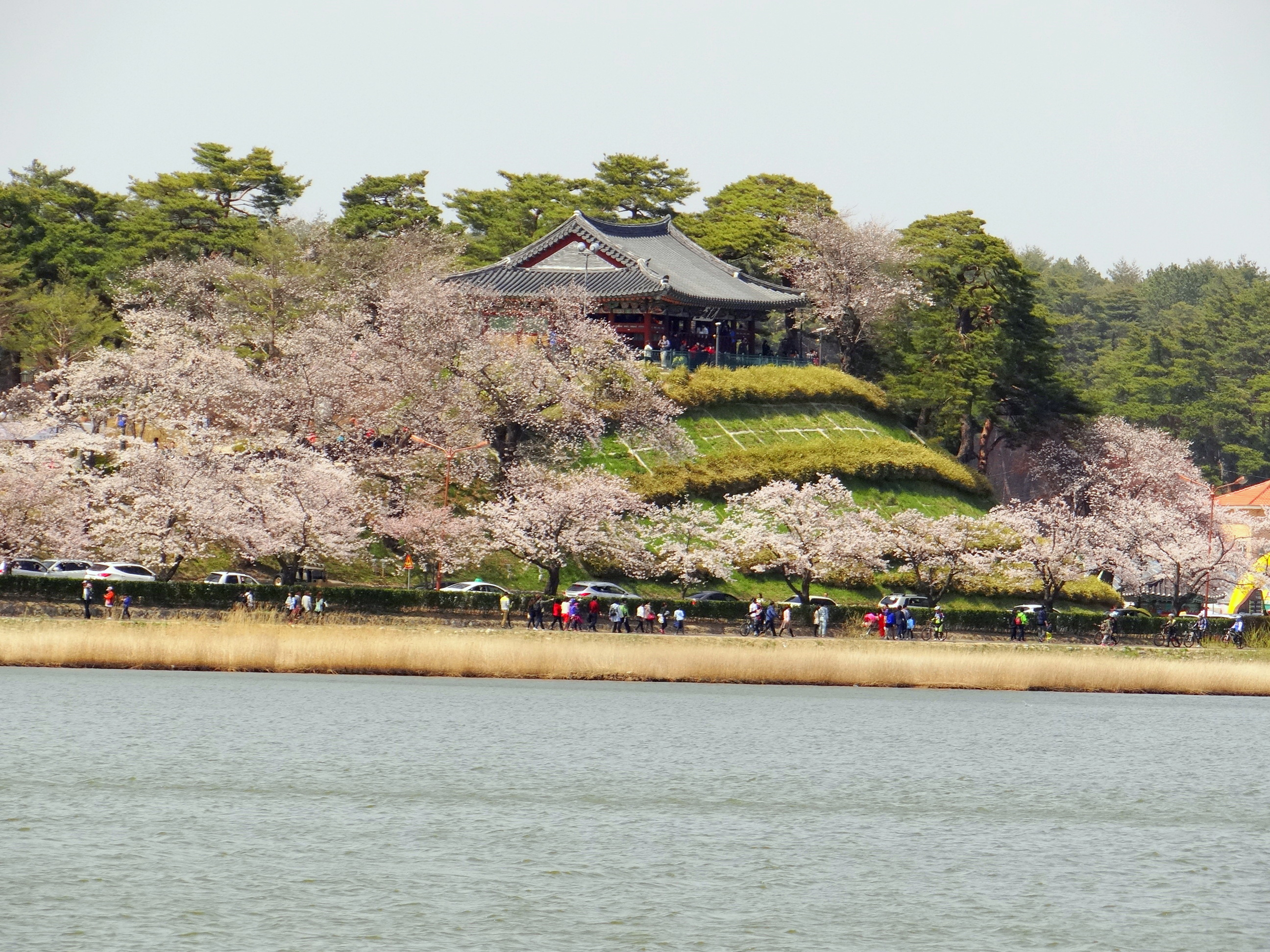
Gyeongpo Lake in Gangneung

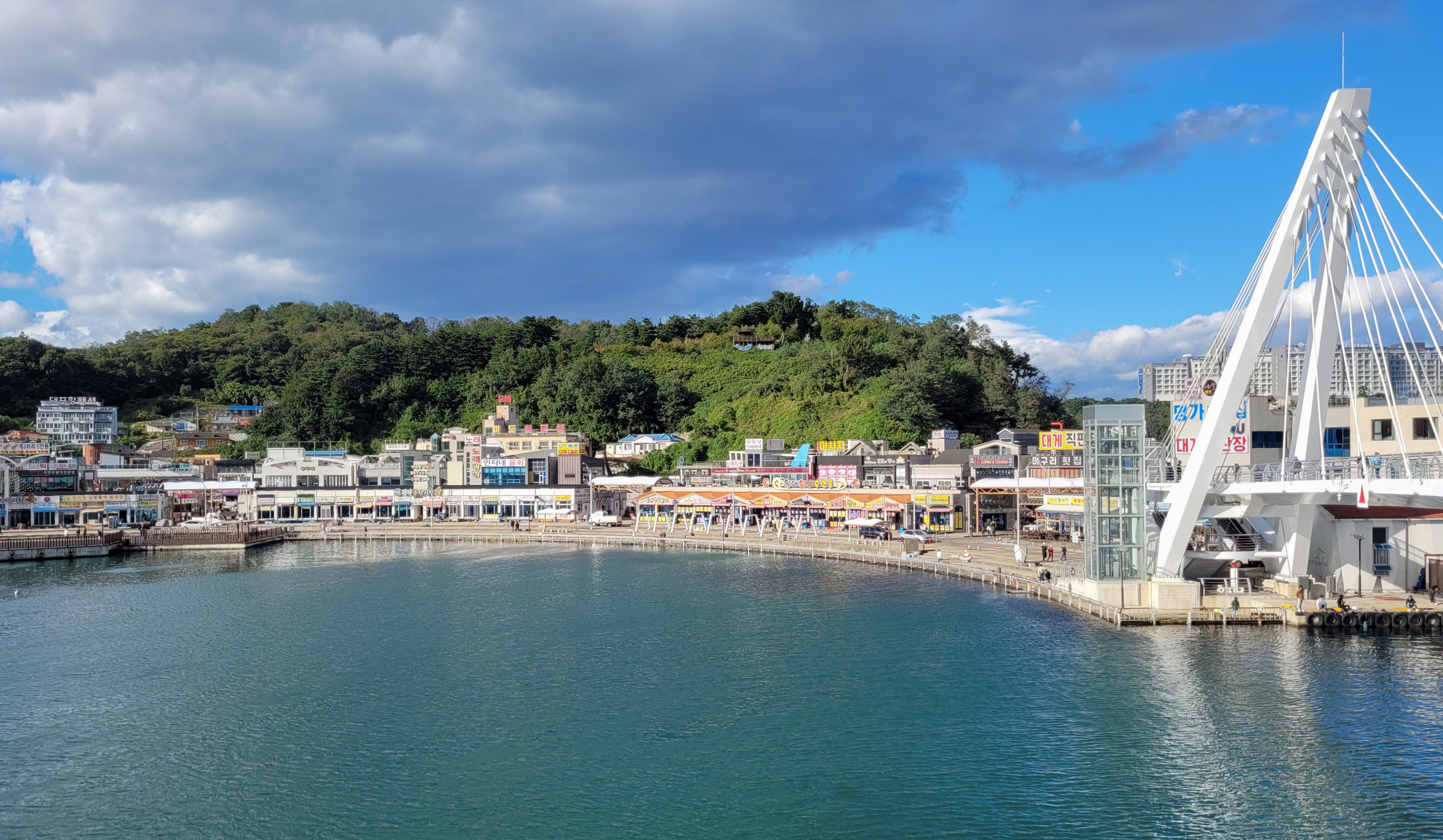
Sokcho

- Sokcho — Seoraksan, Ulsanbawi, Sinheungsa Temple
- Gangneung — Ojukheon, Seongyojang, birthplace of Yul Gok, Gyeongpo Lake
- Pyeongchang — Woljeongsa, Odaesan, Daegwallyeong Stock Farm
- Donghae
- Yangyang — Naksansa Temple
- Samcheok — Samcheok Railbike, Hwanseong and Daegeum Caves, Haesindang Park, Samcheok Rose Park, Samcheok, Jeungsan, Yonghwa, Maengbang and Jangho Beaches
- Wonju — Gangwon Gamyeong, Guryongsa Temple, Park Kyung-ni Literature Park
- Jeongseon — Molundae
- Hongcheon — Suta Temple
- Goseong
- Yeongwol — Jangreung, Eorayeon, Gossigul, Kimsatgat Sites, Cheongryeongpo, Youngwol dahanu Village

Byeolmaro Observatory, Donggang Photo Museum, Bongraesan Mountain. Hanbando terrain in Soyanggang River

- Taebaek — Taebaek Mountain, Manggyeongsa Temple, Taebaek Mountains Literature Park, Hwangji Pond
- Cheolwon — Cheorwon Peace Observatory, Memorial Tower of the Baekma Goji (Korean War)
- Hoengseong — Seong Sammum's Tomb, Noeundan, Baekyasa
- Inje —
- Yanggu —
- Hwacheon —

==== North Chungcheong Province ====
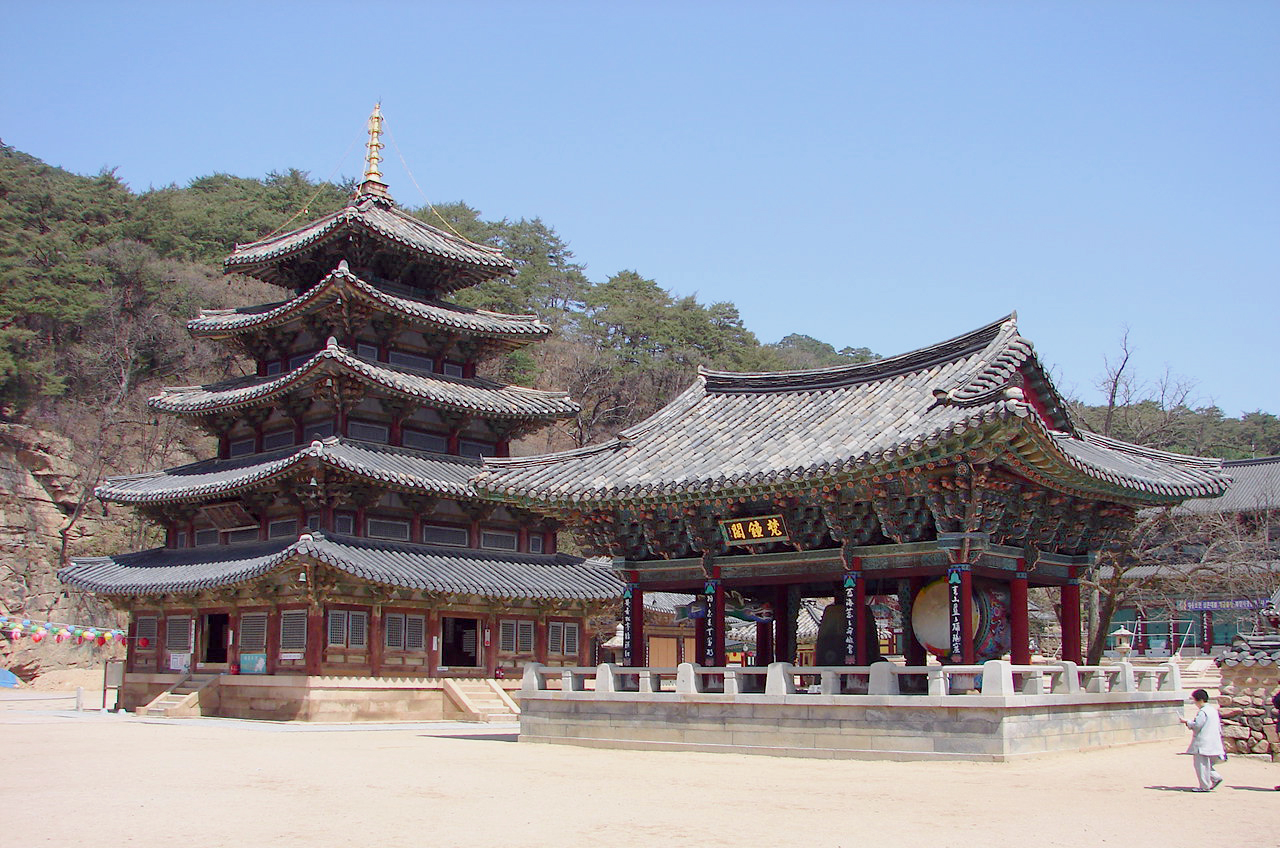
Beopjusa Temple in Boeun

- Boeun — Beopjusa Temple, Songnisan National Park, Samnyeonsanseong Fortress, Seon Byeong-guk House, Songnisan National Park
- Danyang — Guinsa Temple, Gosu Cave, Danyang Ondal Cave, Dodamsambong Peaks
- Cheongju — Cheongju National Museum, Cheongnamdae, Sangdangsanseong Fortress
- Jincheon — Bell Museum, Botapsa Temple

==== South Chungcheong Province ====
- Gongju — Tomb of King Muryeong, Gongsanseong, Magoksa Temple, Donghaksa Temple, Gapsa Temple, Seonhwadang, Gongju National Museum
- Buyeo — Buyeo National Museum (Gilt-bronze Incense Burner of Baekje), Five storied stone pagoda of Jeongnimsa Temple site, Gungnamji, Nakhwa-am, Muryangsa Temple, Baekje Royal Tombs (Neungsan-ri Ancient Tombs)
- Cheonan — The independence hall of Korea, Gakwonsa Temple
- Seosan — Rock-carved triad buddha, Haemieupseong Fortress
- Nonsan — Mireuk-bosal at Gwanchoksa Temple
- Boryeong - Dacheon beach

==== North Jeolla Province ====
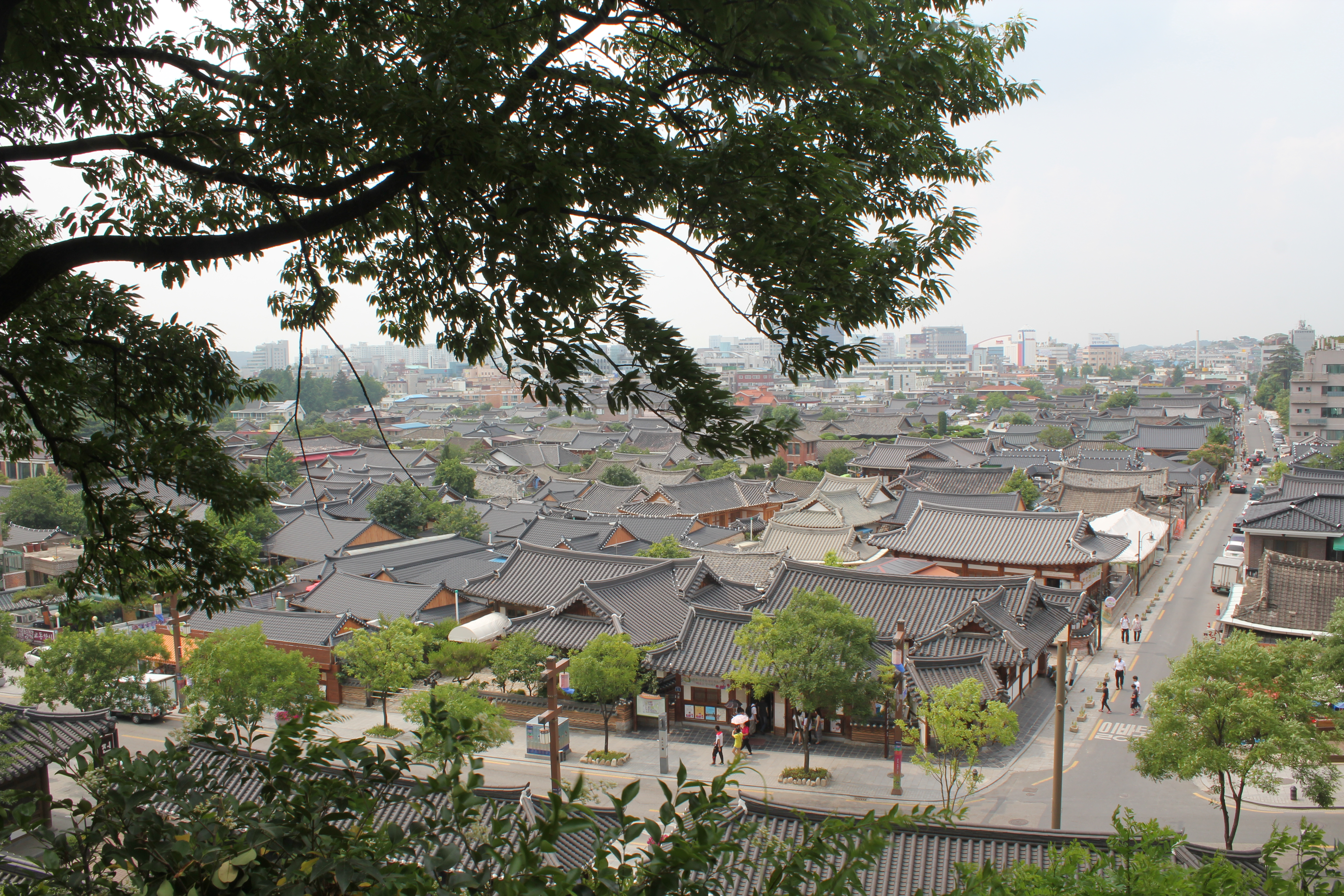
Hanok Village in Jeonju

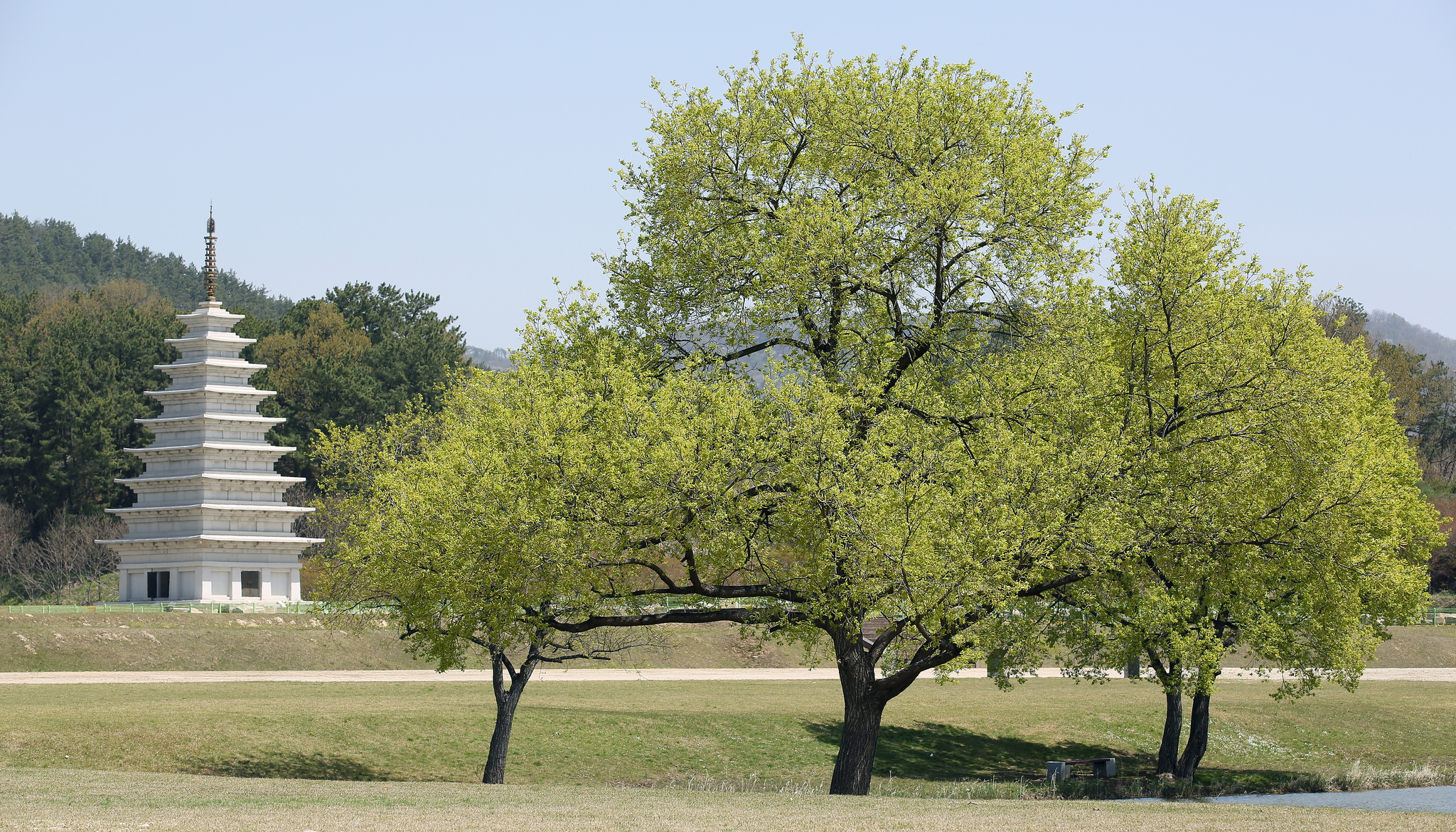
Mireuksa Temple Site in Iksan

- Jeonju — Jeonju Hanok Village, Jeondong Catholic Church, Gyeonggijeon Shrine, Hanji Museum, Royal Portrait Museum, Jeonju Gaeksa, Jeonjuhyanggyo Confucian School
- Namwon — Gwanghallu Pavilion, Chunhyang Theme Park, Manin Cemetery of Righteous Fighters, Silsangsa Temple, Gyoryong Sanseong Fortress
- Gochang — Gochangeupseong Fortress, Seonunsa Temple, Pansori Museum
- Iksan — Mireuksaji Pagoda,
- Gimje — Geumsansa Temple
- Gunsan — Hirotsu House, Dongguksa Temple
- Buan — Tapsa Temple, Byeonsanbando National Park

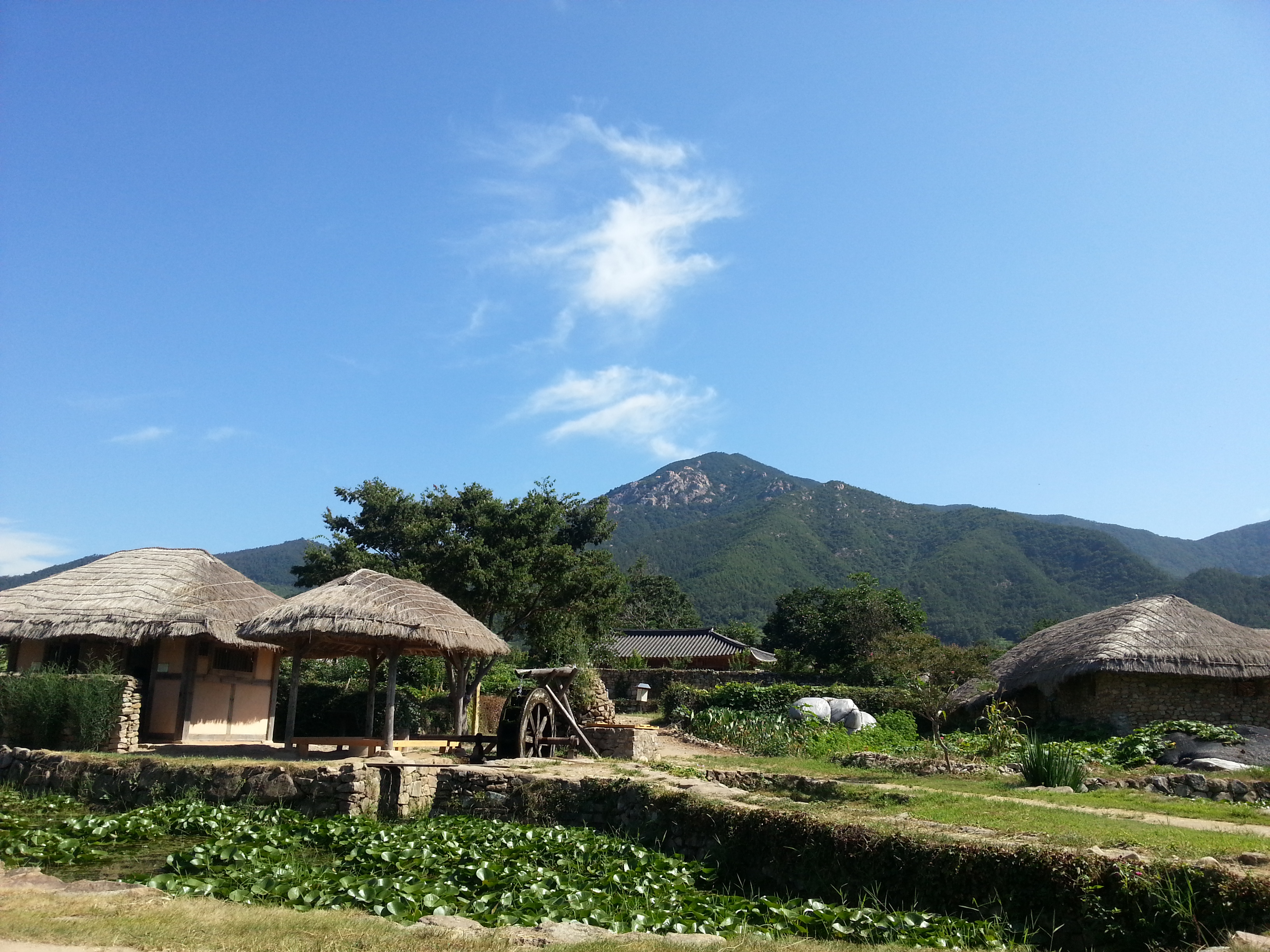
Nagan Eupseong Folk Village in Suncheon

==== South Jeolla Province ====
- Yeosu — Jinnamgwan Hall, Hyangiram, Yi Sun Shin Square
- Suncheon — Songgwangsa Temple, Seonamsa Temple, Nagan Eupseong Folk Village
- Mokpo — Mokpo Modern History Museum, Gatbawi Rock, Yudal Mountain
- Haenam — Ttangggut (End of the Land) Village, Mihwangsa Temple
- Gurye — Hwaeomsa Temple
- Damyang — Damyang Juknokwon, Metasequoia-lined Road, Soswaewon Garden
- Boseong — Boseong Green Tea Field Daehan Dawon
- Wando — Cheongsan island (slow city)

==== North Gyeongsang Province ====
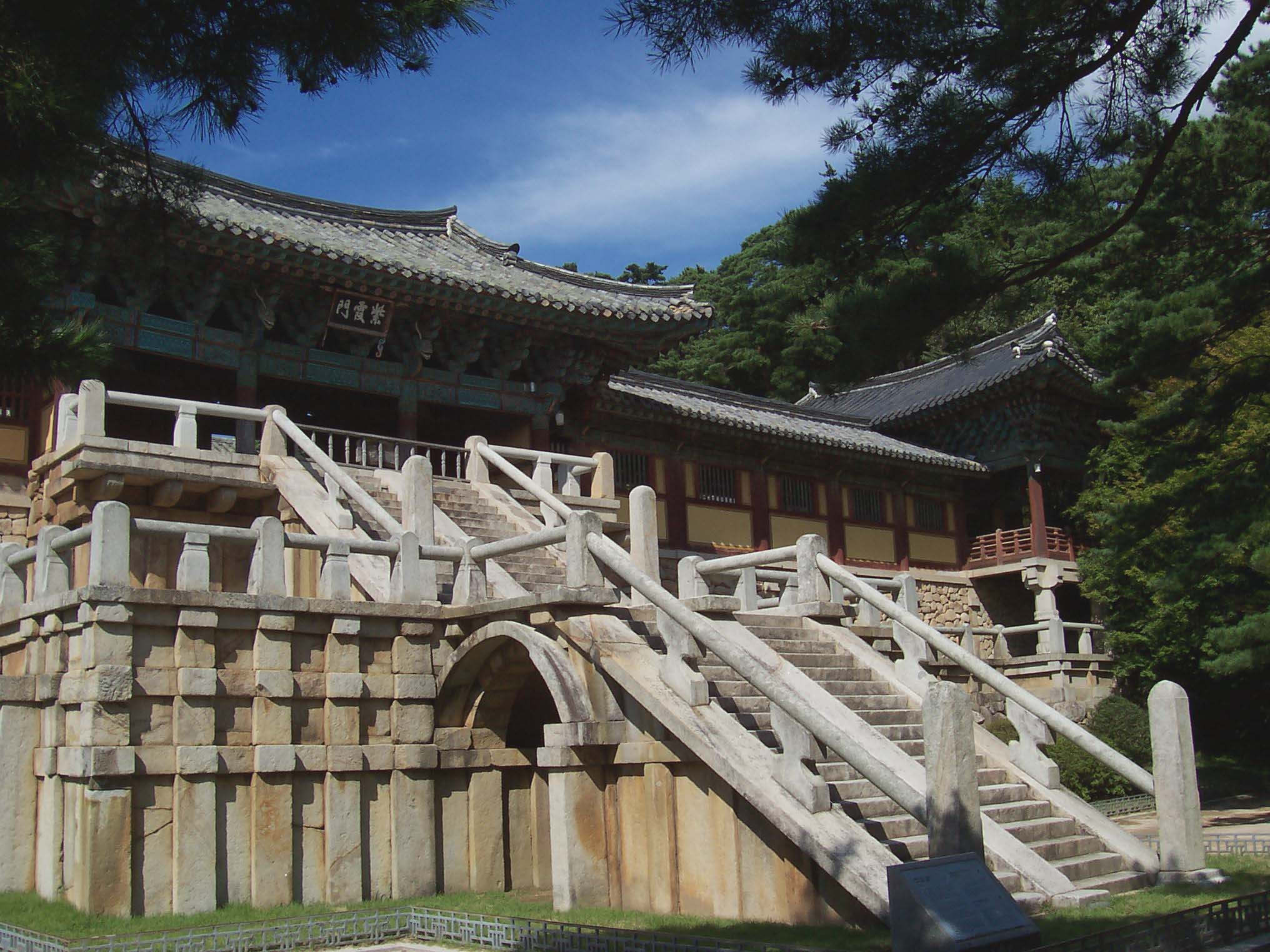
Bulguksa Temple in Gyeongju

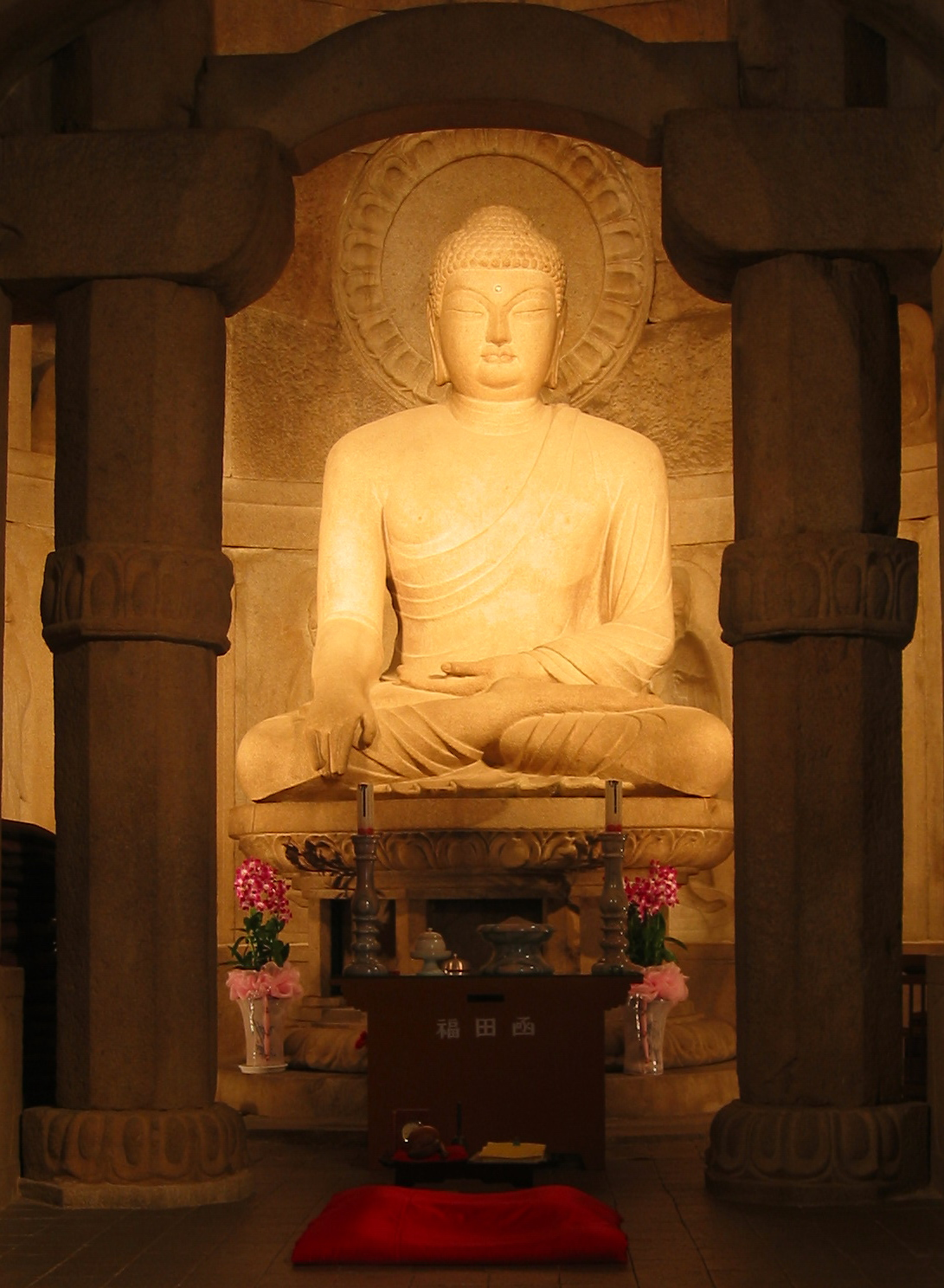
Seokguram in Gyeongju

- Gyeongju — Bulguksa Temple, Seokguram, Anapji Pond, Gyeongju National Museum, Cheonmachong Tomb, Cheomseongdae Observatory, Yangdong Folk Village, Bunhwangsaji (Bunhwangsa Temple Site)
- Andong — Hahoe Folk Village, Hahoe Mask Museum, Dosanseowon Confucian School, Byeongsanseowon Confucian School, Wollyeongo Bridge
- Yeongju — Buseoksa Temple
- Mungyeong — Mungyeong Saejae Provincial Park
- Ulleung — Dokdo Island

==== South Gyeongsang Province ====
- Yangsan — Tongdosa Temple
- Hapcheon — Haeinsa Temple
- Tongyeong — Dongpirang Wall Painting Village
- Jinju — Jinjuseong, National Jinju Museum
- Geoje — Historic Park of Geoje POW Camp, Sinseondae
- Namhae — Gacheon Daerangi Village, Namhae German Village
- Gimhae — Tomb of King Suro, Tomb of Queen Heo Hwang-ok
- Changnyeong — Upo Wetland
- Miryang — Yeongnamnu, Pyochungsa, Eoreumgol Valley

==== Jeju Special Self-governing Province ====
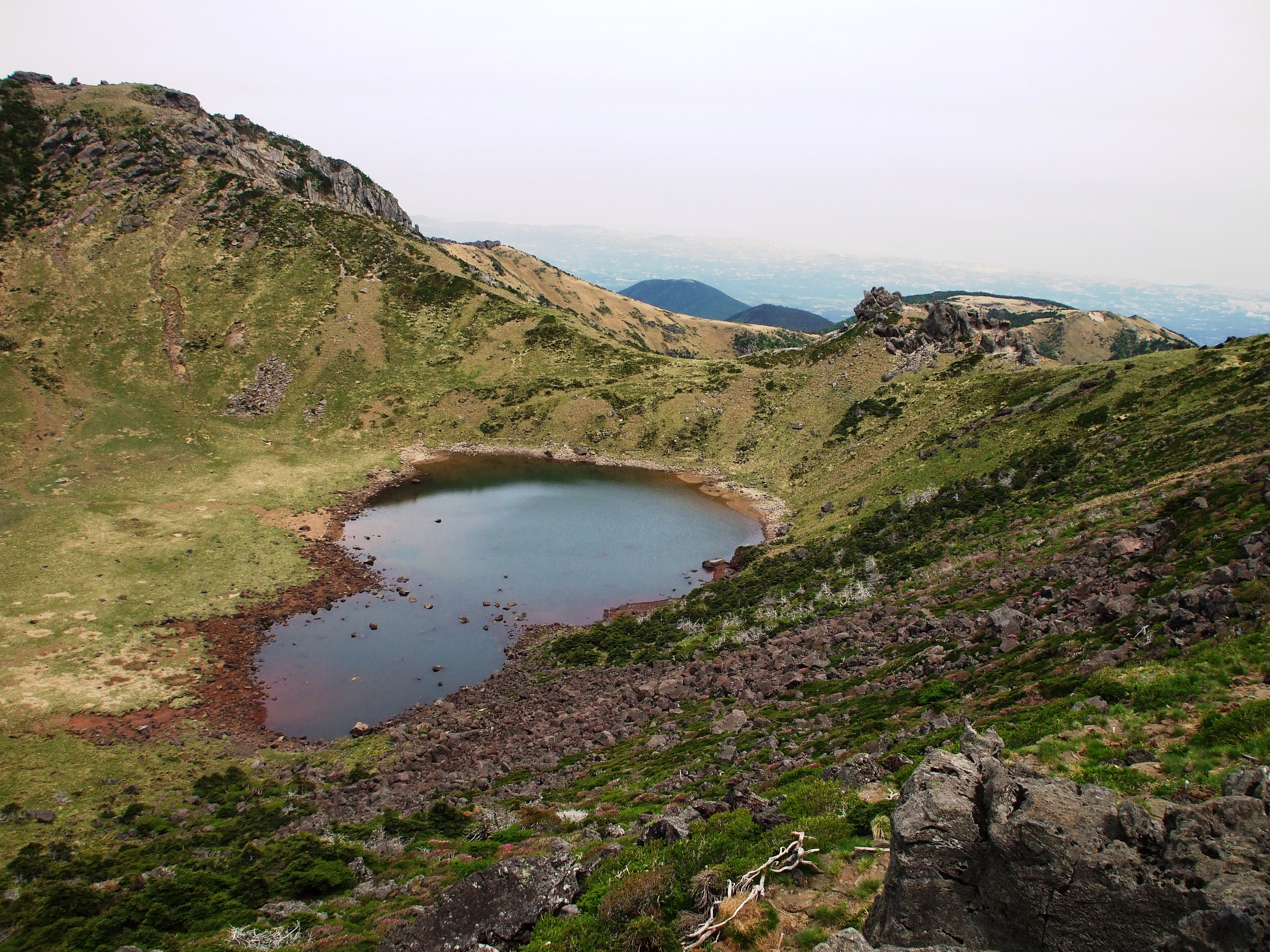
Mount Halla in Jeju Island

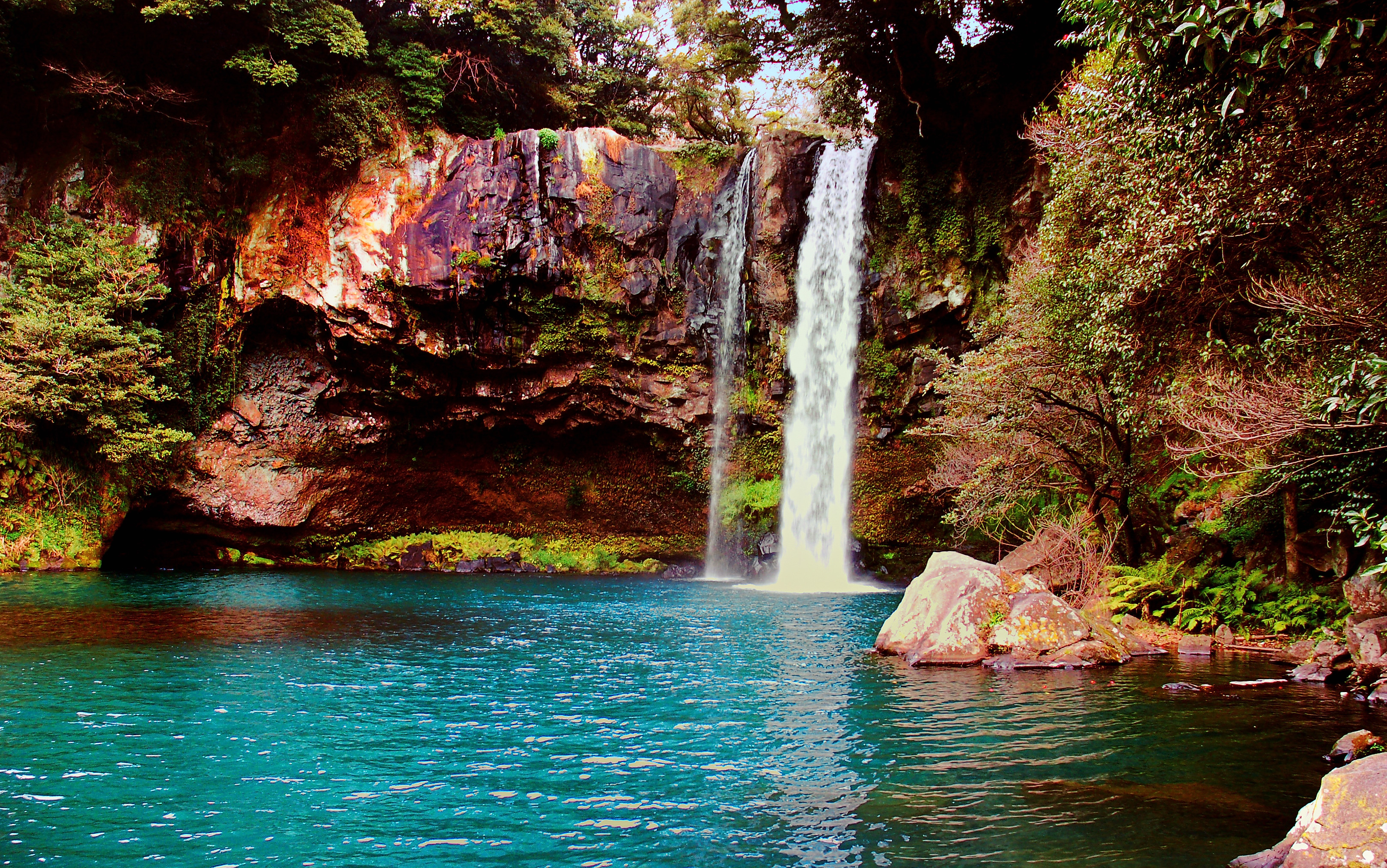
Cheonjiyeon Waterfall in Jeju Island

- Mount Halla
- Cheonjeyeon and Cheonjiyeon waterfalls
- Hallim Park
- Yakcheonsa Temple
- Manjanggul
- Jeju Stone Statue Park

== Events ==
South Korea has hosted several international events, including the 1988 Summer Olympics, the 1993 Taejon Expo, the 2002 FIFA World Cup (jointly hosted with Japan), the 2005 APEC conference, the 2010 G-20 Seoul summit, the 2014 Asian Games, and the 2018 Winter Olympics.

== See also ==
- Korean Wave
- Economy of South Korea
- Visa policy of South Korea
- Korea Tourism Organization
- Medical tourism in South Korea
- List of South Korean tourist attractions
  - Tourism in Gyeongju
  - List of museums in South Korea
  - National Treasures of South Korea
  - World Heritage Sites in South Korea
  - List of oldest restaurants in South Korea
- Seoul
  - Sports in Seoul
  - Shopping in Seoul
  - Economy of Seoul
