= Haedong Yonggungsa =

Buddhist temple in Busan, South Korea

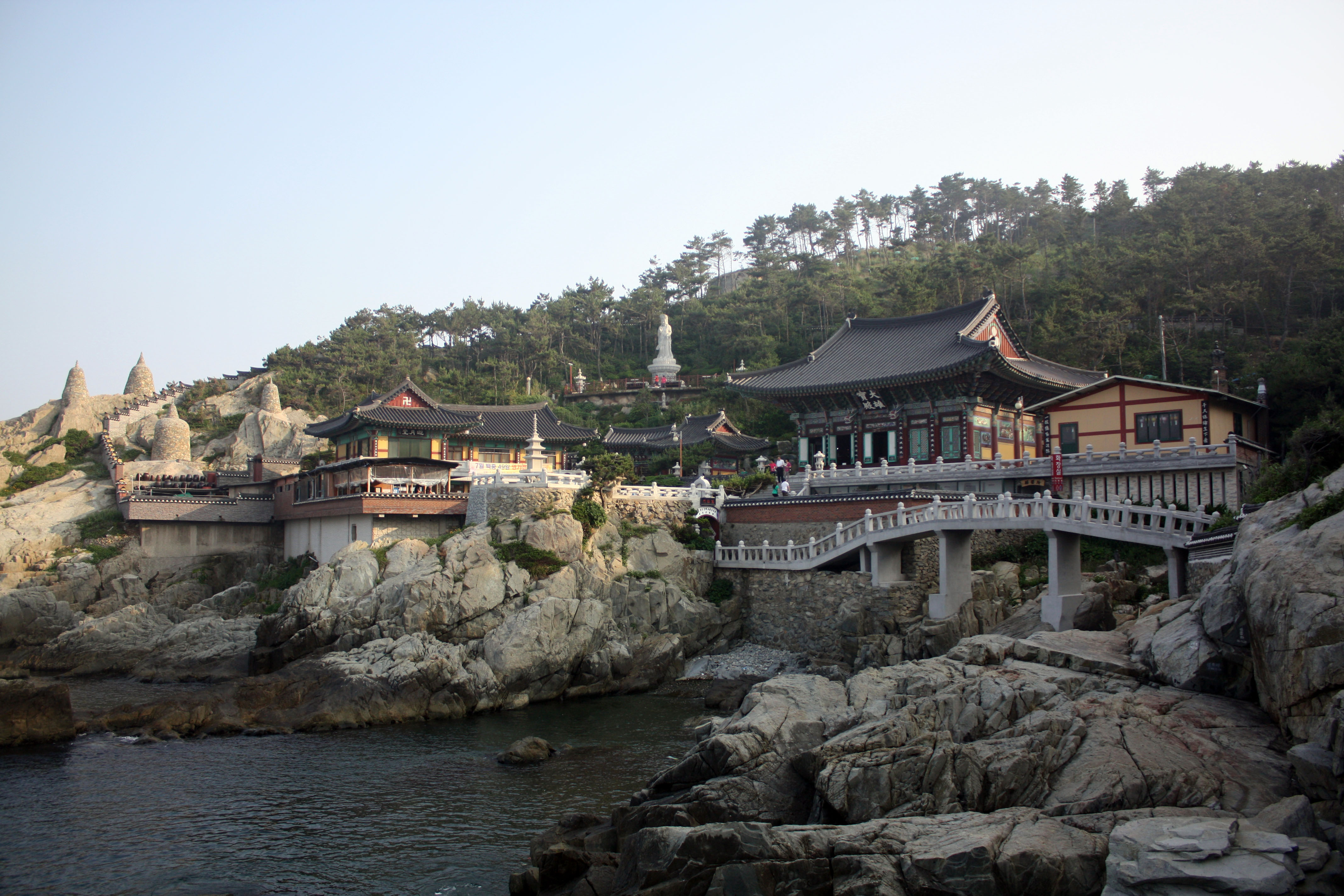
- The temple in 2010

- Location within Busan Location within South Korea

Religion
- Affiliation: Buddhism

Location
- Location: Gijang County, Busan
- Country: South Korea
- Coordinates: 35°11′18″N 129°13′24″E

Architecture
- Completed: 1930s

Website
- yongkungsa.or.kr/eng/01/01.php

Korean name
- Hangul: 해동 용궁사
- Hanja: 海東龍宮寺
- RR: Haedong Yonggungsa
- MR: Haedong Yonggungsa

Haedong Yonggung Temple (Korean: 해동 용궁사) is a Buddhist temple in Gijang-gun, Busan, South Korea.

The temple claims it was first built in 1376, although this claim has been disputed. The temple complex is a large one and one of few in Korea to be set on the seaside. As such, combined with its proximity to Haeundae Beach and the east side of Busan, the temple is popular with sightseers, particularly during Buddha's Birthday celebrations when the complex is decorated with paper lanterns. It honors Haesu Gwaneum Daebul (海水觀音大佛), the Sea Goddess Buddha of Mercy, who is an aspect of Gwaneum (Guanyin).

== Gallery ==
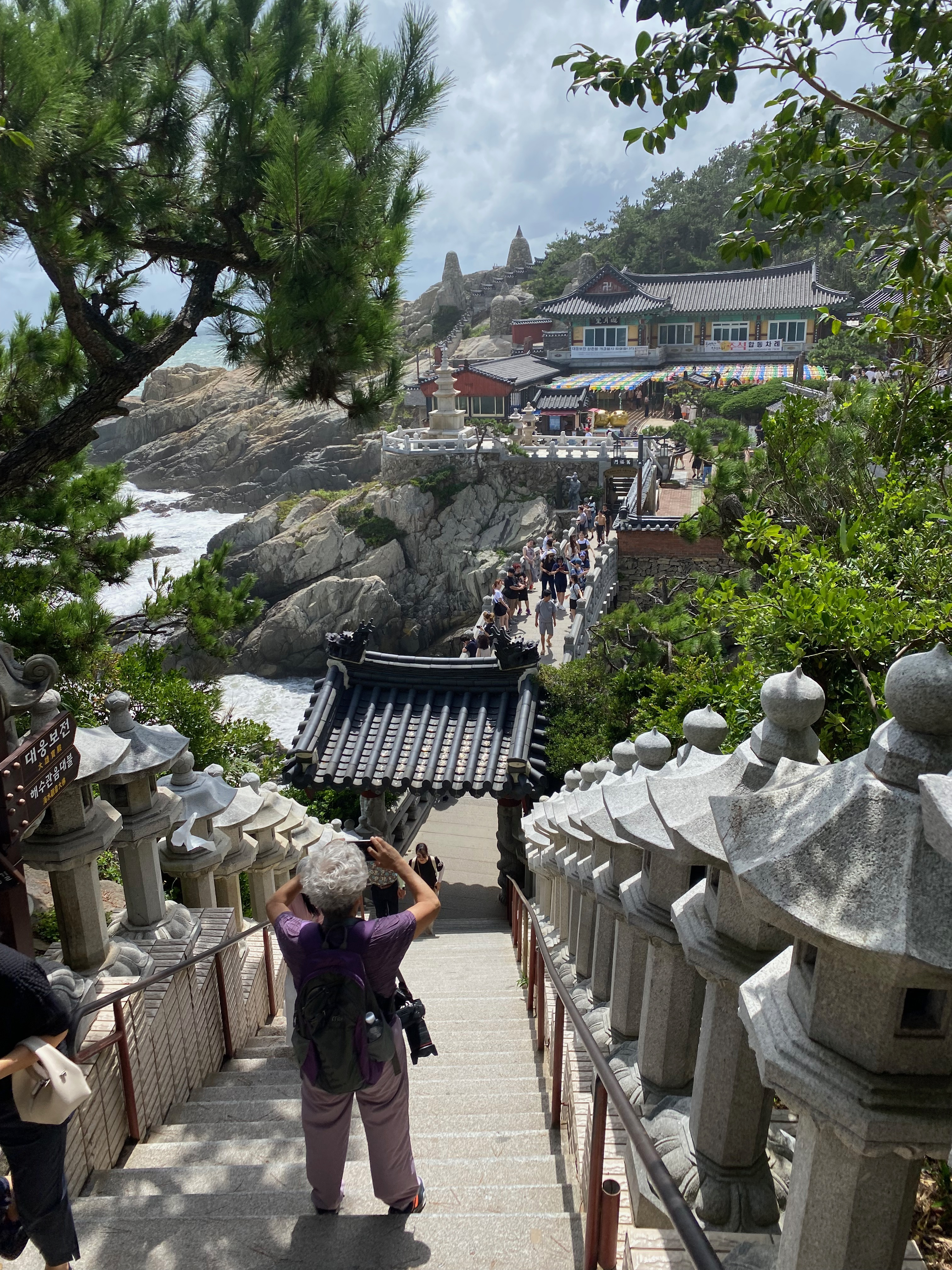
The narrow walkway down to the temple

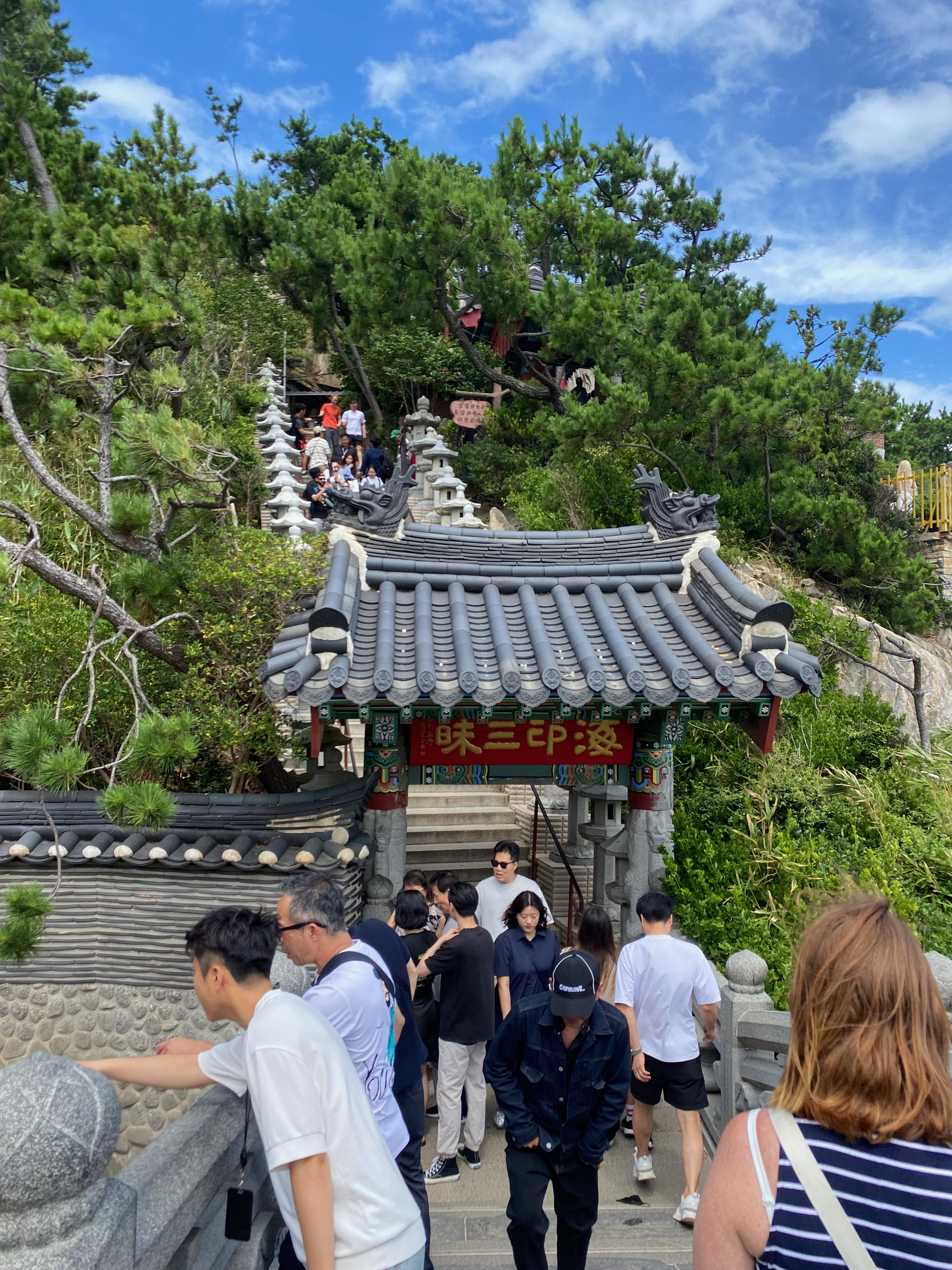
Looking back up the walkway

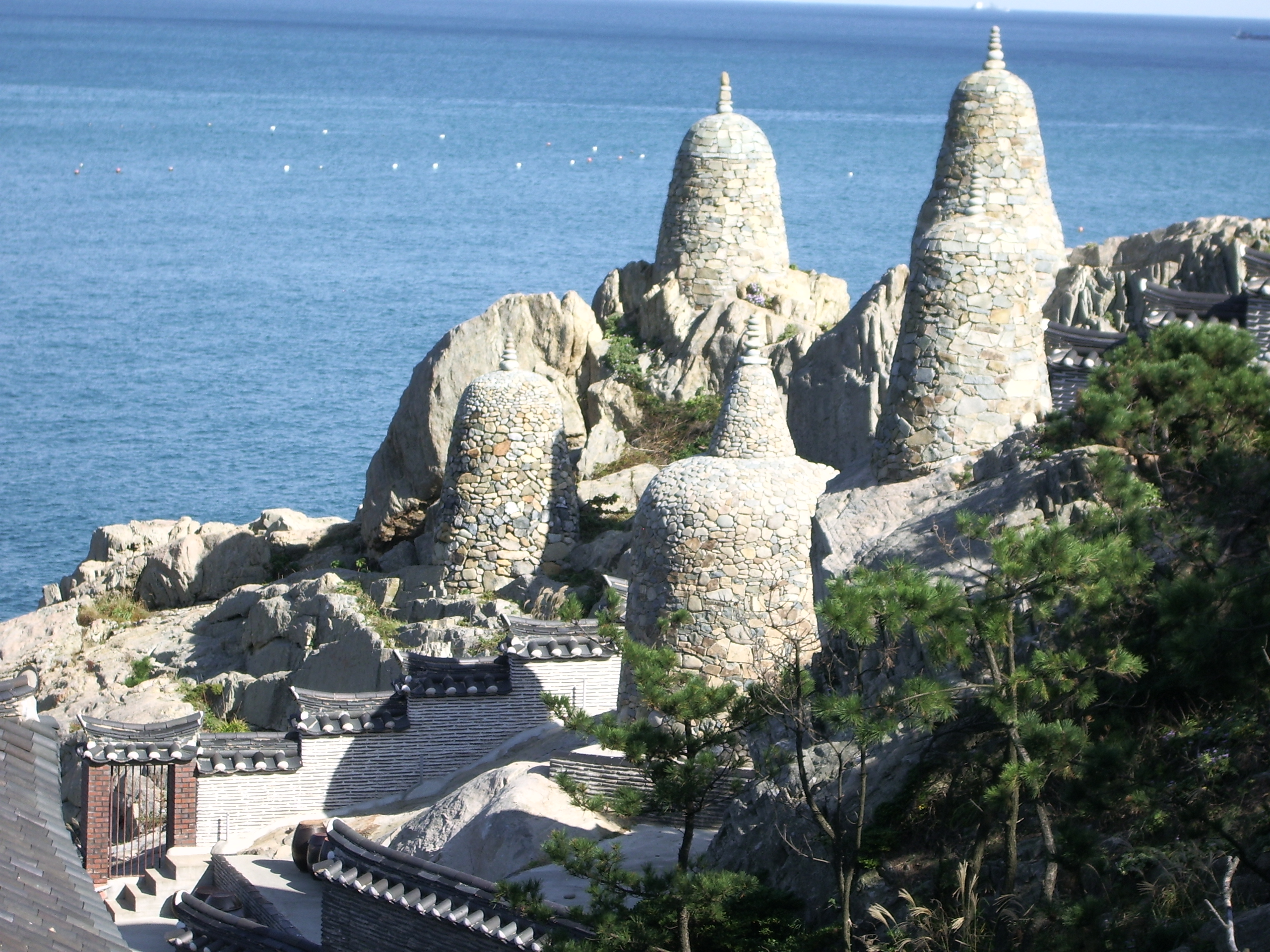
Stupas

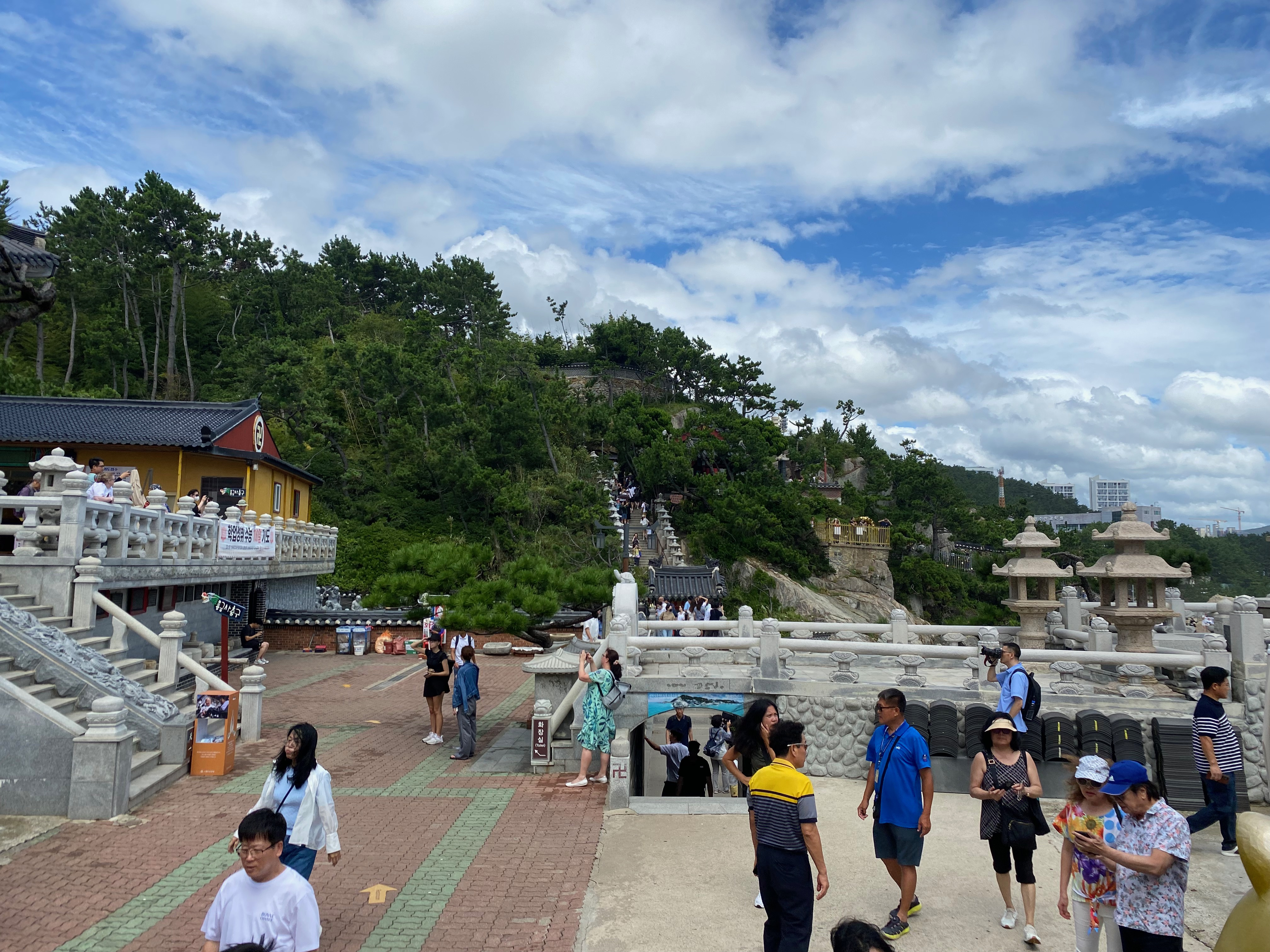
Inside the temple complex

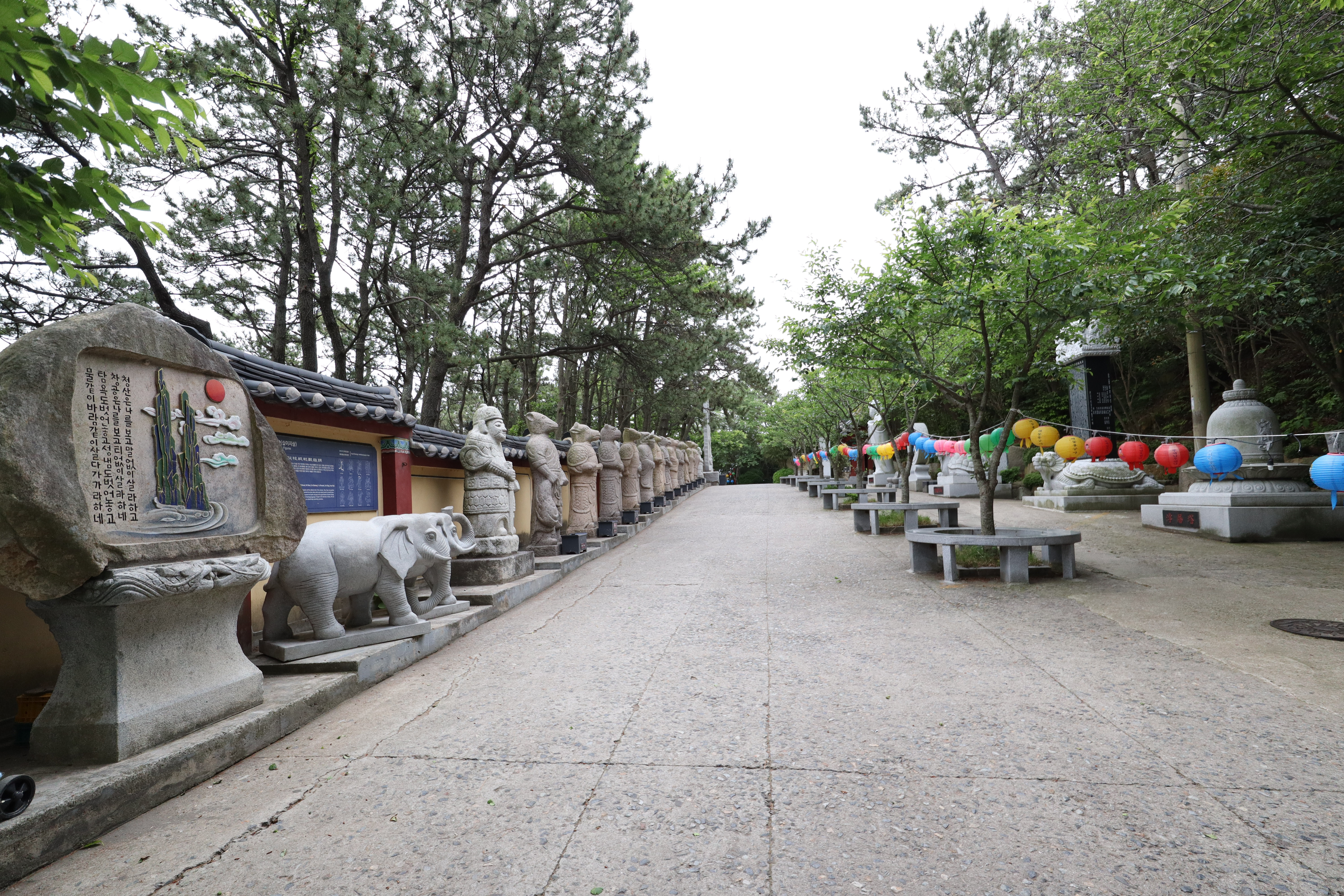
The walking street from the road to the temple

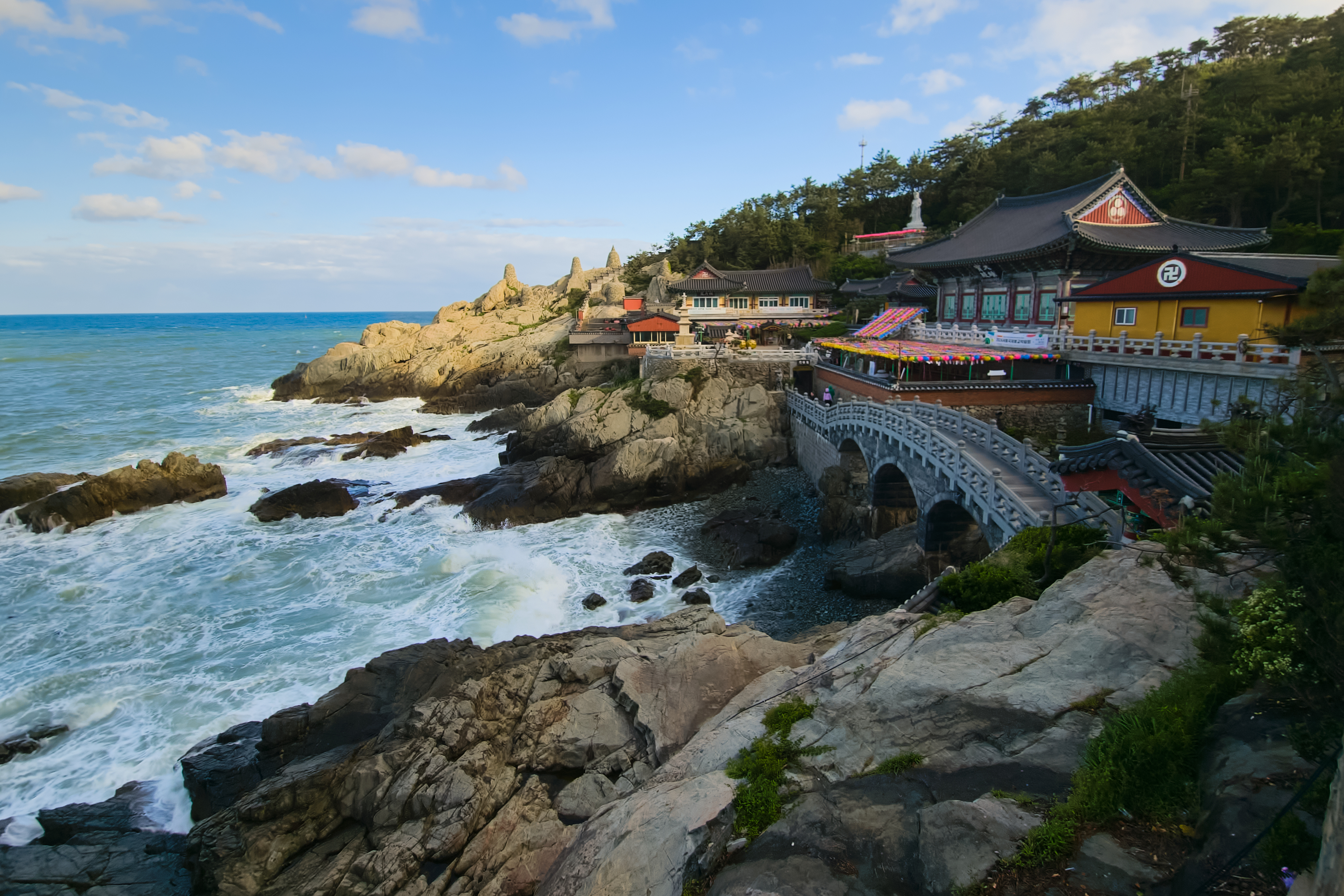
Seaside panorama

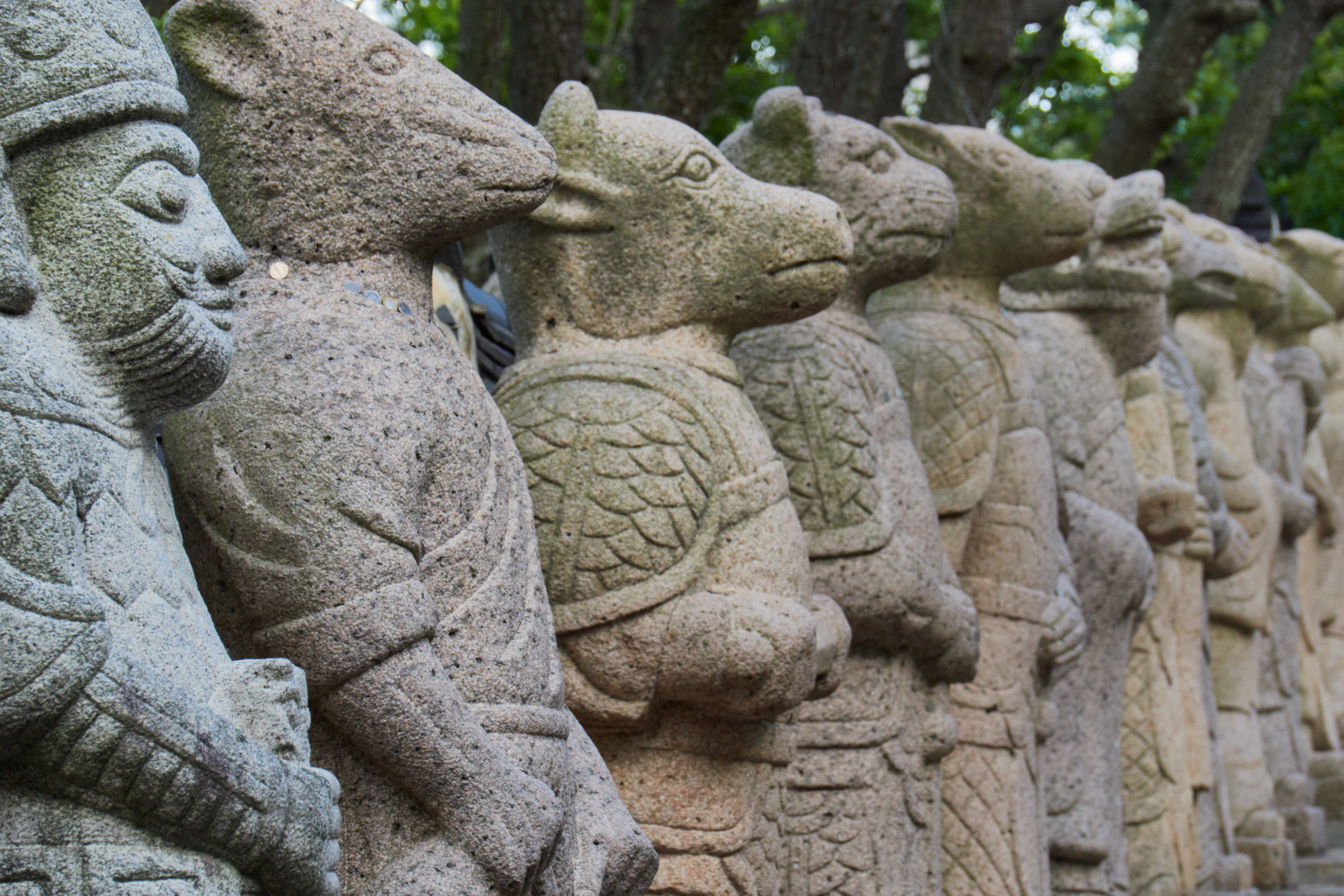
Zodiac animal statues

== See also ==
- Hwaeomsa
- Beomeosa, another notable temple in Busan
