= List of The Best Cooking Secrets episodes (2020) =

- No. of episodes: TBA

Release
- Original network: EBS
- Original release: 1 January 2020 – present

Season chronology
- ← Previous; 2019 Next → N/A

This is a list of episodes of the longest-running South Korean cooking show The Best Cooking Secrets in 2020. The show airs on weekdays on EBS 1TV. The 2020 season is hosted by Leeteuk.

== Episodes ==
List of 2020 episodes
Ep.	Airdate	Title	Guest	Recipe
1	1 January 2020	New Year's food that tastes better with your family!	Choi Kyung-sook	Vegetable tteokguk and Grilled Japanese amberjack with soy sauce
2	2 January 2020	New Year's food that tastes better with your family!	Choi Kyung-sook	Braised beef in tofu jjim with leek
3	3 January 2020	New Year's food that tastes better with your family!	Choi Kyung-sook	Steamed oyster broth and Bomdong salad
4	6 January 2020	Energised in the new year! Hot and whole winter cuisine!	Lim Jong-yeon	Fish cake soup and Kimchi fried rice
5	7 January 2020	Energised in the new year! Hot and whole winter cuisine!	Lim Jong-yeon	Octopus skewer and Crispy potato pancake
6	8 January 2020	Energised in the new year! Hot and whole winter cuisine!	Lim Jong-yeon	Black bean rice and Black bean noodles
7	9 January 2020	Energised in the new year! Hot and whole winter cuisine!	Lim Jong-yeon	Braised pollock with radish and Radish side dish
8	10 January 2020	Energised in the new year! Hot and whole winter cuisine!	Lim Jong-yeon	Tofu tangsuyuk (vegetarian tangsuyuk) and Egg and tomato salad
9	13 January 2020	A special home meal that is better than take out menu in holiday season!	Kim Jong Un	Steak over rice and Seaweed salad
10	14 January 2020	A special home meal that is better than take out menu in holiday season!	Kim Jong Un	Fried tofu topping on rice balls
11	15 January 2020	A special home meal that is better than take out menu in holiday season!	Kim Jong Un	Roasted vegetable curry and Lotus root and citrus in vinegar broth
12	16 January 2020	A special home meal that is better than take out menu in holiday season!	Kim Jong Un	Oyster fried udon and Chonggak radish pickle
13	17 January 2020	A special home meal that is better than take out menu in holiday season!	Kim Jong Un	Fried squid siraegi and Fried udon
14	20 January 2020	Revealing the traditional rice cake recipe to welcome the Korean New Year	Yoon Sook-ja	Sweet pumpkin and prawn rice cake pizza
15	21 January 2020	Revealing the traditional rice cake recipe to welcome the Korean New Year	Yoon Sook-ja	Coffee flavoured glutinous rice cake and Rice cake made out of coffee
16	22 January 2020	Revealing the traditional rice cake recipe to welcome the Korean New Year	Yoon Sook-ja	Rice waffle and Sweet pumpkin latte
17	23 January 2020	Revealing the traditional rice cake recipe to welcome the Korean New Year	Yoon Sook-ja	Apple seolgi and Apple cinnamon tea
18	24 January 2020	Revealing the traditional rice cake recipe to welcome the Korean New Year	Yoon Sook-ja	Yuja yaksik and Yuja-hwachae
19	27 January 2020		Lim Hyo-sook	Cheese bulgogi and Heart-shaped crab meat pancake
20	28 January 2020		Lim Hyo-sook	Seaweed oyster rice soup and Bean sprouts and spring onions salad
21	29 January 2020		Lim Hyo-sook	Chicken rice and Soft tofu salad
22	30 January 2020		Lim Hyo-sook	Pork cutlet ttukbaegi and Cucumber jorim
23	31 January 2020		Lim Hyo-sook	Stir-fried fire chicken and Tuna rice ball
24	3 February 2020		Kim Yong-bin	Crab meat fried rice and Baked welsh onion and pickle
25	4 February 2020		Kim Yong-bin	Instant kimchi jeongol and Wood ear mushroom salad
26	5 February 2020		Kim Yong-bin	Stir fried beef with broccoli and Egg soup
27	6 February 2020		Kim Yong-bin	Dolsot rice with dried vegetables and Chestnut saengchae
28	7 February 2020		Kim Yong-bin	Chicken pizza and Tomato and mandarin orange jorim
29	10 February 2020	Celebrity special	Yoo Jae-suk	Yoo San-seul's instant noodle and Yoo San-seul's rice with toppings
30	11 February 2020	Celebrity special	Yoo Jae-suk	Yoo San-seul's instant noodle and Yoo San-seul's rice with toppings
31	12 February 2020	Celebrity special	Yoo Jae-suk	Leeteuk's jjamppong instant noodle
32	13 February 2020	Celebrity special	Lim Hyung-joo	Chop steak and Mulled wine
33	14 February 2020	Celebrity special	Lim Hyung-joo	Leeteuk's salad pajeon
34	17 February 2020		Ko Jun-young	Chicken burger and Mint milkshake
35	18 February 2020		Ko Jun-young	Spanish omelette and Grilled codfish in lemon sauce
36	19 February 2020		Ko Jun-young	Maple bacon waffle and Broccoli salad
37	20 February 2020		Ko Jun-young	Souffle pancake and Milk tea
38	21 February 2020		Ko Jun-young	Churros and Churros pizza
39	24 February 2020		Jung Ho-young	Seafood stew and Pollock roe egg rice
40	25 February 2020		Jung Ho-young	Japanese Amberjack with daikon jorim and rice topped with grilled pork belly
41	26 February 2020		Jung Ho-young	Salmon sushi balls and Udon mixed with ground chicken
42	27 February 2020		Jung Ho-young	Burdock doenjang soup and Stir-fried beef burdock
43	28 February 2020		Jung Ho-young	Gamtae gimbap and Gamtae egg roll
44	2 March 2020		Bang Yong-ah	Oats and nutritious rice, and Shepherd's purse doenjang soup
45	3 March 2020		Bang Yong-ah	Steamed manila clam and Vongole pasta
46	4 March 2020		Bang Yong-ah	Deodeok salad and Fried deodeok in glutinous rice
47	5 March 2020		Bang Yong-ah	Braised burdock and Burdock rice ball
48	6 March 2020		Bang Yong-ah	Steamed monkfish and Bean sprout soup
49	9 March 2020		Han Myung-sook	Ridged-eye flounder in mugwort soup and Seasoned spinach
50	10 March 2020		Han Myung-sook	Stir-fried webfoot octopus in soy sauce and spring greens salad
51	11 March 2020		Han Myung-sook	Blue crab soup and Manila clam bibimbap
52	12 March 2020		Han Myung-sook	Meat jun and Bibim-guksu
53	13 March 2020		Han Myung-sook	Braised half-dried pollock and Stir-fried acorn rice cake
54	16 March 2020		Choi In-sun	One person braised spicy chicken and Water dropwort jeon
55	17 March 2020		Choi In-sun	Tofu jorim, and Salt sandspurrey and whelk salad
56	18 March 2020		Choi In-sun	Cockle bibimbap and Wild chive doenjang-guk
57	19 March 2020		Choi In-sun	Spicy beef soup and spicy pork with vegetables
58	20 March 2020		Choi In-sun	Stir-fried pork with bracken and Water dropwort fried rice
59	23 March 2020		Park Yong-ran	Marinated brisket with bomdong and Green garlic water kimchi
60	24 March 2020		Park Yong-ran	Ripened kimchi jorim and Dried filefish fillet jorim
61	25 March 2020		Park Yong-ran	Shepherd's purse and cheonggukjang stew, and Spicy dried squid strips
62	26 March 2020		Park Yong-ran	Salted squid and Squid and daikon salad
63	27 March 2020		Park Yong-ran	Green pumpkin and doenjang jjim, and Seasoned cuttlefish
64	13 April 2020		Song Hoon	Pork sizzling and Stir-fried spicy pork
65	14 April 2020		Song Hoon	Green onion kimchi fried rice and Onion ring rice pancake
66	15 April 2020		Song Hoon	Kimchi stew and Grilled bone sirloin
67	16 April 2020		Song Hoon	Abalone black rice risotto
68	17 April 2020		Song Hoon	Sirloin steak with mushroom sauce
69	20 April 2020		Lee Jae-hoon	Italian grilled eggplant and Rice topped with eggplant doenjang
70	21 April 2020		Lee Jae-hoon	Rice topped with chicken and soy sauce, and Tomato and chicken leg jorim
71	22 April 2020		Lee Jae-hoon	Beef brisket jjamppong and Lemon cream shrimp
72	23 April 2020		Lee Jae-hoon	Triple ragù pasta and Tomato cheese salad
73	24 April 2020		Lee Jae-hoon	Fish cutlets and Avocado sandwich
74	27 April 2020		Jeon Jin-joo	Seafood and soft tofu stew, and Peanut fried rice
75	28 April 2020		Jeon Jin-joo	Glehnia cucumber salad and Stir-fried spicy seafood noodles
76	29 April 2020		Jeon Jin-joo	Spinach frittata and Stir-fried beef rice noodles
77	30 April 2020		Jeon Jin-joo	Dried pollock soup
78	1 May 2020		Jeon Jin-joo	Deep fried pork belly and Pickled onions
79	4 May 2020		Park Bo-kyung	Sweet potato baguette pizza and Fruit chocolate fondue
80	5 May 2020		Park Bo-kyung	Chicken tenders cereal and Banana with caramel sauce
81	6 May 2020		Lee Jong-im	Abalone mushroom rice and Egg chamnamul soup
82	7 May 2020		Lee Jong-im	Braised dried pollack bean sprouts, and Chili pepper and doenjang stew
83	8 May 2020		Lee Jong-im	Nuts tteok-galbi and Carrot apple juice

== Release ==
Due to COVID-19 outbreak, episodes from 30 March until 10 April 2020 were cancelled to make way for special program Conquering COVID-19 special live broadcast - EBS is here. The awareness program was aired daily from 9:30am to 1:50pm for two weeks. The Best Cooking Secrets resumed its airing on 13 April 2020.
