= Juksun Food Village =

Food-themed street in Damyang, South Korea

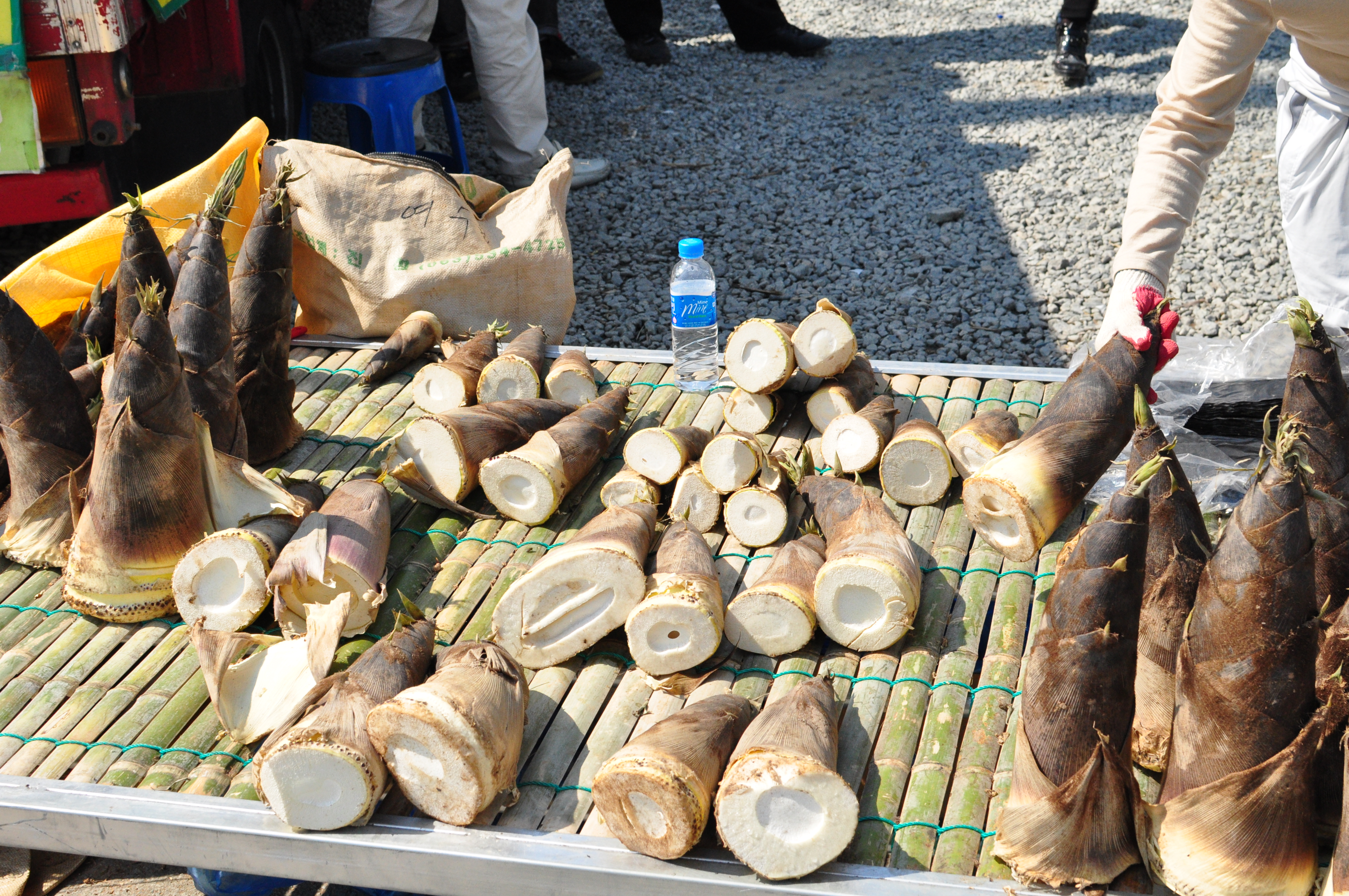
Juksun - Bamboo shoots

Juksun Food Village located in Damyang, South Jeolla Province, South Korea, is a Korean food-themed street. Juksun means bamboo shoot. This was selected as one of the food-themed streets in 2013 along with Snow Crab Street in Yeongdeok, and Myeongdong-style Dakgalbi street in Chuncheon. This is part of the food tourism campaign which includes promoting food streets, themed food tours on train travels, Korean traditional alcohol, farms, locals, and market for specific regions based on local ingredients including seasonal food.

This food village provides a variety of cuisine made with bamboo. Among them particularly three dishes are famous namely Daenamu tongbap—which is rice in bamboo, juksun—bamboo shoot, and tteokgalbi—grilled beef rib patties. There are clusters of restaurants in Juksun Food village that specializes in making Daenamu tongbap. Since 2004 the bamboo garden Juknokwon drew in a lot of visitors which resulted in restaurants opening up in the village and the food village began to gain popularity around 2005. From May to November Juksun Food Village experiences the most footfall by locals and tourists, especially on weekends. The food village also provides various recreational activities like a forest bathing trip in Juknokwon or a walk in the bamboo grove. Apart from the famous three dishes, there is a variety of foods made with bamboo grown in the region like liquor brewed from its leaves, bamboo salt, syrup, bamboo tea, and also bread from Juksun. In Damyang-gun “Jocheong” or grain syrup made by residents using “Juksun” or bamboo shoots a representative local resource and well-being food.

== Specialties ==
=== Daenamu tongbap ===
Daenamu tongbap or daetongbap or juktongbap is a representative dish of Damyang. There are many mentions of Damyang bamboos in various literature such as Gobongjip- an essay by a civil servant from Joseon Dynasty, Gi Daeseung; Dasan Simunjip- by Jeong Yakyong; Imwon Gyeongjeji-a policy book on rural economy by Seo Yugu but accurate records on daenamu tongbap were not found in the literature. Rice in bamboo or Daenamu tongbap is made by cutting bamboo having about 8–10 cm diameter nodes, these cuts of bamboo are stuffed with rice and ingredients like sorghum, jujubes, millet, black soybean, chestnuts, and ginko nuts and steamed.

Daenamu tongbap helps in preventing many diseases caused by age. It is shown to have helped in preventing lifestyle-related diseases like high blood pressure, diabetes, and coronary sclerosis. It also helps reduce excessive sweat on the neck or face. Furthermore, it was found that tyrosine is released from the bamboo when bamboo filled with rice is boiled in low heat in water, this component gets infused with the rice. Tyrosine is known to help expel phlegm thus relieving oneself from troubled breathing and feeling of suffocation.

Hanji-a traditional Korean paper, bamboo, Jujubes, pine nuts, ginko nuts, soybean, and mixed rice: non-glutinous, glutinous, black rice are used to make the dish. Rice cooked inside the bamboo is mixed grain, along with rice the rest of the ingredients are cooked and later toppings are added.

=== Juksun ===
Juksun is the fresh bamboo shoots. Among the edible variety, Bunjuk is preferred due to its soft and mild texture. In Damyang, these shoots have a crispy texture, and aromatic flavor and have various methods to be cooked from boiling to stirring or pan frying. Before cooking the shoots need to be prepped, from the bamboo grove shoots shaped like pyramids are dug out from the ground and peeled to get a white interior. Most famous dishes made with Juksun are juksun namul which is made by stir-frying the shoots with seed oil of perilla; juksunboe which is made by mixing bamboo shoots and vegetables with vinegar and red pepper paste; and doenjang jigae which is a soybean paste strew boiled with shoots.

Bamboo shoots or Juksun are good for the treatment of diseases due to their high nutritional value. It has high protein, minerals, and vitamin B contents which are helpful to treat a hangover, blood circulation, dieresis, colorectal cancer, constipation, diet and stress, and insomnia as it is rich in dietary fiber, protein, potassium, phosphorus, sulfur, magnesium. Apart from this it also helps with issues like obesity and high blood pressure. Daenamu tongbap when paired with Juksun dishes is known to provide high stamina.

Dae-charcoal tteokgalbi

Dae-charcoal tteokgalbi are grilled beef rib patties that have the appearance of tteok- Korean rice cake. The beef is slowly cooked so that it doesn’t lose any aroma or nutrients and also gains the subtle scent of charcoal. It is served as the king's royal table by finely mincing the beef, or served as to boost for patients and the elderly. The TV programme ‘2 Days & 1 Night’ showed this dish in a restaurant.

Daetongju

It is an alcoholic beverage made by preciously cutting a single piece of bamboo and sucking the alcohol in the jar by osmotic pressure and retaining the aroma of bamboo. It cannot be stored for more than 1year, to remove the alcohol from the bamboo stem reverse osmosis principle is used.

== Environmental benefit ==
The initiative by KTO and MCST to improve tourism via food tourism promoted Damyang Juksun Food Village immensely. This initiative has also benefited the environmental cause of climate change. Bamboo is considered an alternative to climate change and the reason behind this lies majorly in the fact that bamboo is an excellent plant to reduce carbon, The World Bamboo Rattan Network Organization has announced bamboo as the most carbon-reducing plant. Its carbon dioxide absorption capacity of it is four times that of pine, amount of oxygen emission is 35% higher than a general tree species in addition to its high growth rate.
