= Sinsikdang =

Restaurant in Damyang County, South Korea

Restaurant information
- Established: 1932; 93 years ago
- Food type: Korean cuisine, tteok-galbi
- Location: 95 Jungang-ro, Damyang-eup, Damyang County, South Jeolla Province, South Korea
- Coordinates: 35.3216°N 126.9815°E

Sinsikdang (Korean: 신식당) is a historic Korean restaurant in Damyang County, South Jeolla Province, South Korea. The restaurant is among the oldest active restaurants in South Korea, having been founded in 1932. The restaurant is the oldest active tteok-galbi restaurant; some suggest that the restaurant coined that term for the dish around the early 1970s, although one writer for the Blue Ribbon Survey expressed doubt about that theory. The restaurant is now operated by the fourth generation of the same family.

The progenitor of the restaurant is Nam Gwang-ju (남광주), who began creating tteok-galbi in 1909. She married her husband at age 16, and almost immediately after became reputed in the area for her cooking. By age 19, she was asked to prepare food for a local village festival. In 1932, she started a restaurant at the suggestion of others. Nam's daughter-in-law Shin Geum-rye (신금례) inherited the restaurant afterwards, and renamed it Sinsikdang, after her own surname.
