= Jeonnam State University =

Public university in Damyang County, South Korea

Coordinates: 35°19′38″N 126°59′27″E

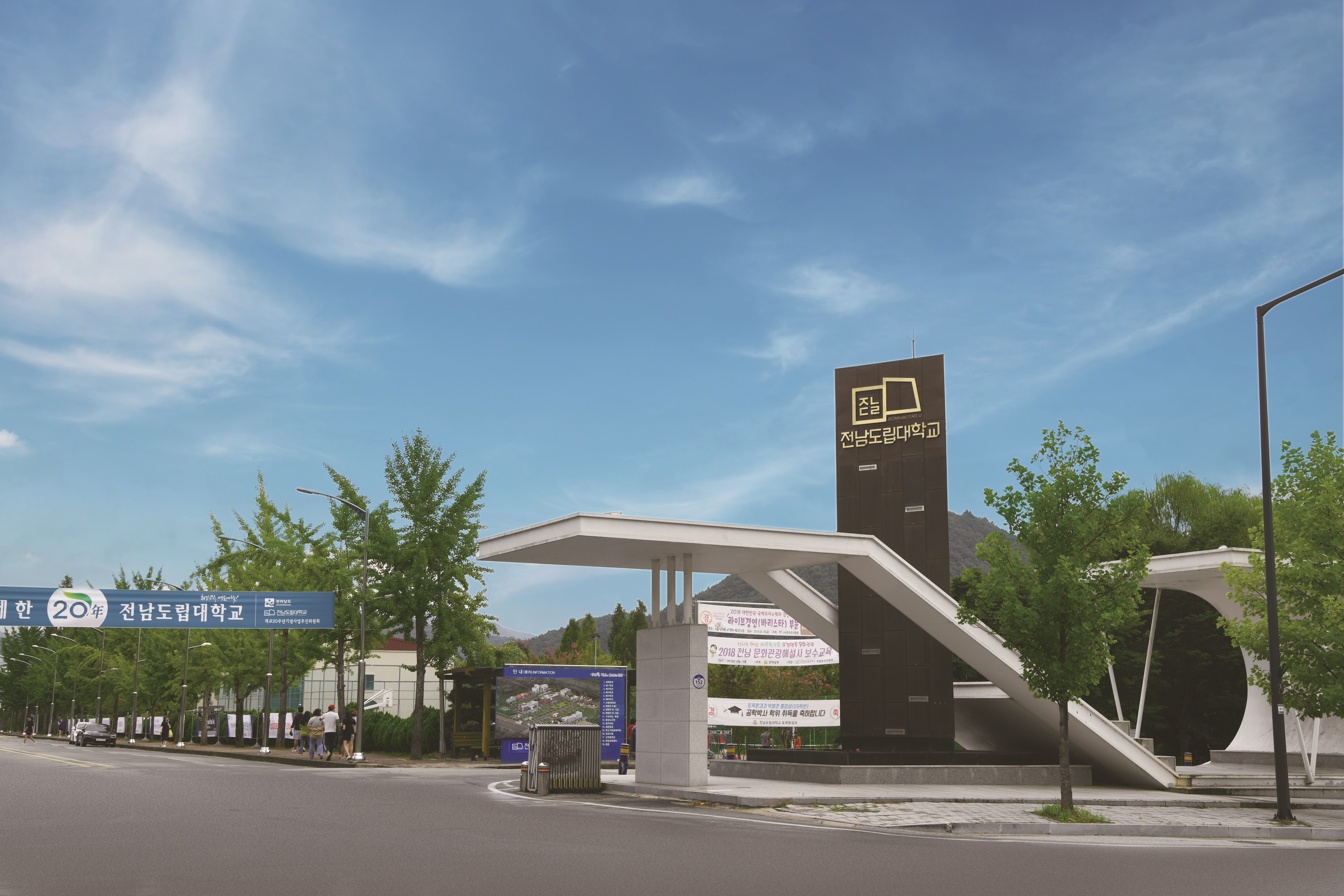
- The main gate of the university
- Type: Public
- Established: March 13, 1998
- Location: South Korea
- Website: Official website

Jeonnam State University (Korean: 전남도립대학교) is a public university in Damyang County, South Korea.

== History ==
- Damyang University was opened in 1998
- Jangheung University was opened in 1999
- On March 1, 2004, Damyang University and Jangheung University were integrated into Namdo University and merged into the Damyang Campus
- On April 4, 2008: Changed name to Jeonnam National University
- In January 2012: Changed name to Chonnam National University
- In August 2012: Selected as a government-funded university by the Ministry of Education, Science and Technology

== Campus ==
Jeonnam National University is a public university in Damyang-gun, Jeollanam-do, with its main campus in Damyang-eup. The campus is about 220,000 square meters, which is similar in size to Busan National University of Foreign Studies and Pai Chai University. The campus is located in a mountainous area and has a large elevation difference, but it is located in the center of Damyang-gun, so the infrastructure is relatively good. Damyang County Government is located near the campus, and Damyang Noodle Street is located near the campus.

A central library is located in the northern part of the campus, and a ceramics studio is located in the southern part.
