= Galbi-jjim =

Korean braised short rib dish

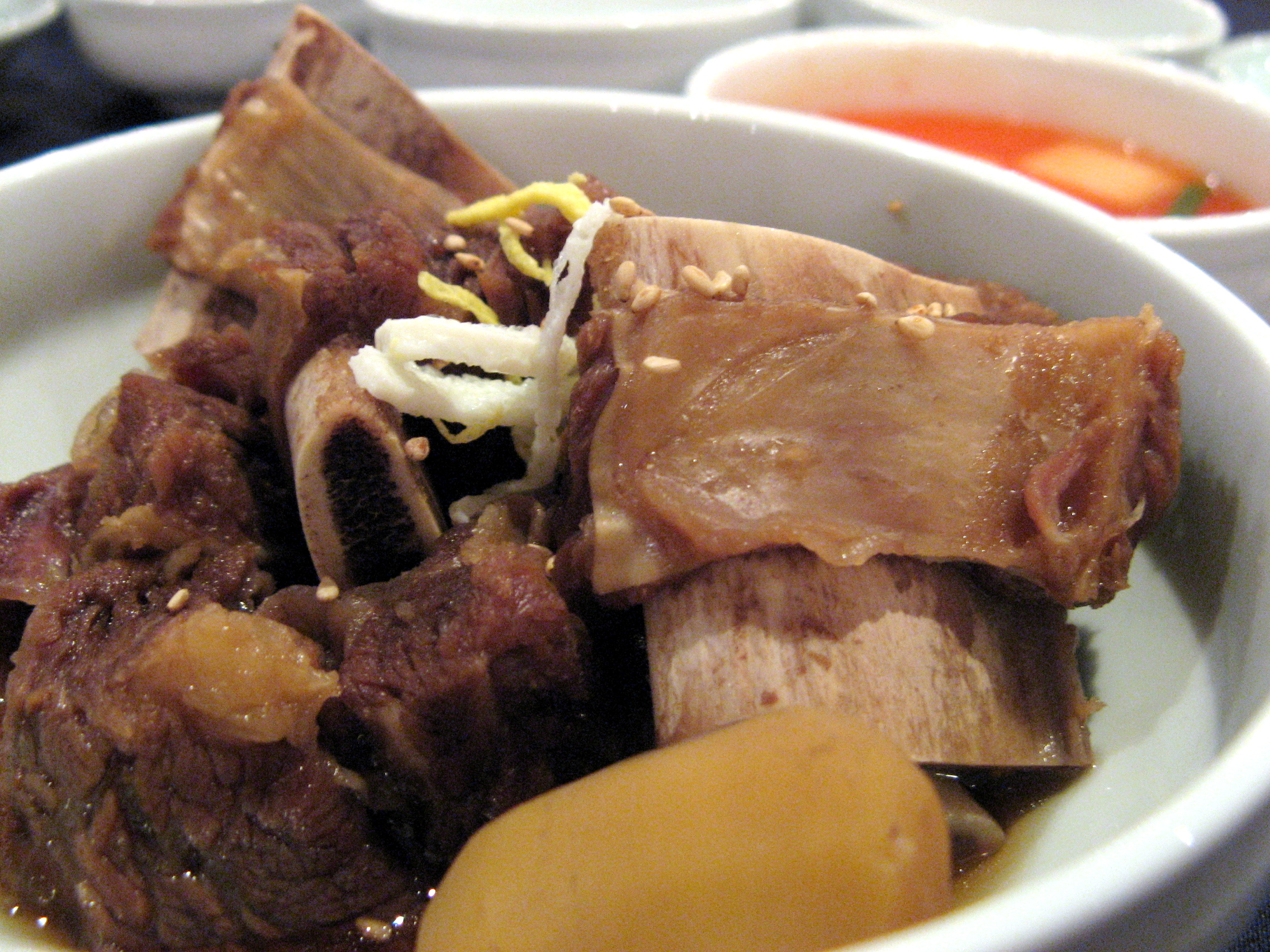
- Alternative names: Braised short ribs
- Type: Jjim
- Place of origin: Korea
- Main ingredients: Short ribs

Korean name
- Hangul: 갈비찜
- RR: galbijjim
- MR: kalbitchim
- IPA: kal.bi.t͈ɕim

Galbi-jjim (Korean: 갈비찜; pronounced [kal.bi.t͈ɕim]), or braised short ribs, is a variety of jjim or Korean dish made with galbi (갈비, short rib). Galbijjim is generally made with beef or pork (돼지, dweji) short ribs. In the latter case, it is called dweji galbijjim (돼지갈비찜).

== History ==
In traditional cuisine, galbijjim was traditionally eaten at Chuseok along with songpyeon, namul, taro soup, chestnut dumplings (밤단자), chicken jjim and autumn fruit. As galbijjim is usually made from only the center part of ribs from a calf while the rib ends used to make soup stock, galbi was more expensive than other cuts of beef in South Korea, and has been regarded as a high-class dish.

== Preparation and serving ==
Ribs are cut to size and excess blood should be removed. Cuts are made in the meat to the bone, allowing the seasoning to seep in. Excess fat is removed from the ribs, either by cutting or removing after parboiling. Soy sauce, sesame oil, scallions, minced garlic, pepper, ground sesame with salt (깨소금), ginger juice, and sugar are mixed together with the ribs and are simmered in a large pot on a mid-flame. Cooking is done slowly while occasionally stirring. When the meat is almost cooked, additional seasoning is added with jujube, ginkgo nuts, carrots, and pine nuts, and it is brought back to a boil once again. Chestnuts, shiitake, and seogi mushrooms are added near the end of cooking. Galbijjim is usually served in a bowl rather than a plate and was traditionally served in a hap (합, bowl with cover).

== Galbijjim by region ==
There is a galbijjim street in the district of Dongin-dong, Daegu, in South Korea. It is known as the original home of hot and spicy galbijjim (매운갈비찜), as a restaurant owner served the first plate of hot and spicy galbijjim as anju for makgeolli in 1972. The district still maintains its reputation as being the place to go for tasty galbijjim.

Jong-galbijjim (종갈비찜) is a variety of pork galbijjim from the Gyeonggi Province region. Pork ribs are marinated in ginger juice, soy sauce, minced garlic, sesame oil, ground sesame with salt, and pepper. The dish is cooked on a high flame and the sauce is reduced accordingly.

== Gallery ==
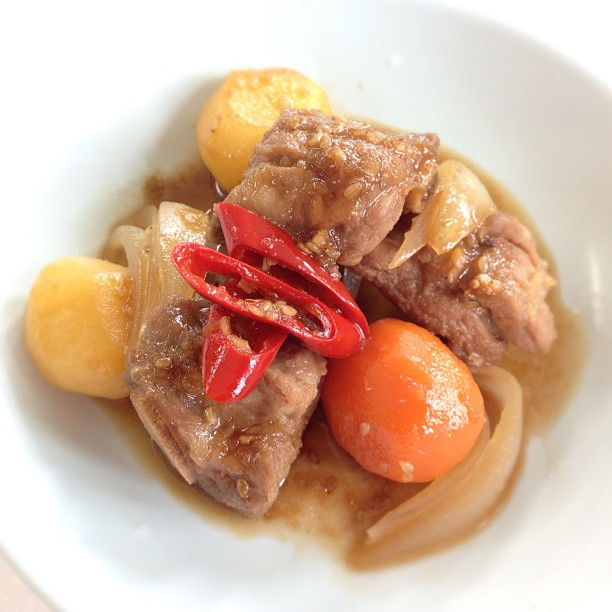
Dwaeji-galbi-jjim (braised pork ribs)

== See also ==
- Jjim
- Galbi
- Galbi-tang
- Jorim
- Korean cuisine
- List of steamed foods
