= Streptomyces rhizosphaerihabitans =

Scientific classification
- Domain: Bacteria
- Kingdom: Bacillati
- Phylum: Actinomycetota
- Class: Actinomycetia
- Order: Streptomycetales
- Family: Streptomycetaceae
- Genus: Streptomyces
- Species: S. rhizosphaerihabitans

Binomial name
- Streptomyces rhizosphaerihabitans Lee and Whang 2016

Type strain
- KACC 17181, NBRC 109807, JR-35, JR-46

Species of bacterium

Streptomyces rhizosphaerihabitans is a bacterium species from the genus of Streptomyces which has been isolated from bamboo forest soil in Damyang on Korea.

== See also ==
- List of Streptomyces species
