= Streptomyces adustus =

Scientific classification
- Domain: Bacteria
- Kingdom: Bacillati
- Phylum: Actinomycetota
- Class: Actinomycetia
- Order: Streptomycetales
- Family: Streptomycetaceae
- Genus: Streptomyces
- Species: S. adustus

Binomial name
- Streptomyces adustus Lee and Whang 2016

Type strain
- NBRC 109810, KACC 17197, WH-9

Synonyms
- Streptomyces rhizosphaerae

Species of bacterium

Streptomyces adustus is a bacterium species from the genus of Streptomyces which has been isolated from bamboo forest soil in Damyang on Korea.

== See also ==
- List of Streptomyces species
