= Streptomyces fuscigenes =

Scientific classification
- Domain: Bacteria
- Kingdom: Bacillati
- Phylum: Actinomycetota
- Class: Actinomycetia
- Order: Streptomycetales
- Family: Streptomycetaceae
- Genus: Streptomyces
- Species: S. fuscigenes

Binomial name
- Streptomyces fuscigenes Lee and Whang 2018

Species of bacterium

Streptomyces fuscigenes is a bacterium species from the genus of Streptomyces which has been isolated from a bamboo Sasa borealis from Damyang in Korea.

== See also ==
- List of Streptomyces species
