= Streptomyces graminilatus =

Scientific classification
- Domain: Bacteria
- Kingdom: Bacillati
- Phylum: Actinomycetota
- Class: Actinomycetes
- Order: Streptomycetales
- Family: Streptomycetaceae
- Genus: Streptomyces
- Species: S. graminilatus

Binomial name
- Streptomyces graminilatus Lee and Whang 2014

Type strain
- JL-6, KACC 16470, NBRC 108882

Species of bacterium

Streptomyces graminilatus is a bacterium species from the genus of Streptomyces which has been isolated from the plant Sasa borealis in Damyang in Korea.

== See also ==
- List of Streptomyces species
