= Yeongdeok Snow Crab Street =

Food street in Yeongdeok, South Korea

Yeongdeok Snow Crab Street is a street in Yeongdeok, South Korea, with a defined cuisine theme. Yeongdeok was selected as one of the 2013 food-themed streets together with Juksun Food Village in Damyang and Dakgalbi Street in Chuncheon.

Yeongdeok Snow Carb Street sign

== Origin of Yeongdeok Snow Crab ==
Snow crab was offered to the monarch at the royal meal from the Goryeo to the Joseon dynasties. Legend has it that Wanggeon, the founder of the Goryeo Dynasty, first experienced snow crab in a location in Gyeongjeong-ri of Chuksan-myeon in Yeongdeok, which is now Chayu Village, in 930 AD while traveling to Gyeongju. The term "daege," a combination of the Korean letters daenamu and ge, which represent bamboo and crab, respectively, was given to the crabs that were gathered from the sea close to this settlement because they possessed legs that resembled bamboo shoots. It was then included in the royal diet.

== Yeongdeok Snow Crab and its varieties ==
In South Korea, snow crabs are a native species, and their Korean name, "daege," literally translates to huge crab in English. Snow crab is a winter delicacy that is well known for its meaty, long legs, soft texture, sweet flavour, and length. Due to the belief that eating snow crab on New Year's Day will bring good health for the rest of the year, it is an integral part of Korean New Year Festival. The food chain of plankton and snow crabs under the sea is different from other sea locations because the coast of Yeongdeok has a golden sandy bottom and is in a very different environment from the tidal flats of the west coast. The Yeongdeok snow crab has evolved spontaneously as a result of the snow crabs' long-term environmental adaptation and acclimatisation.

Yeongdeok snow crab is a high-protein basic food. Snow crabs from Yeongdeok have a significant impact on local economy in addition to providing health benefits. Since 1969, Yeongdeok-gun has issued a statistical yearbook with a cover featuring Yeongdeok snow crab, solidifying Yeongdeok snow crab as a defining Yeongdeok speciality.

Snow crabs housed and displayed in aquariums

In the Snow Crab Street, snow crabs are housed in aquariums where seawater is pumped and the saline level is maintained consistently to keep the crabs fresh. These aquariums have labels to specify the kind of snow crab they contain. Bakdal daege, Yeongdeok daege, Hongge, or red snow, and Neodo daege are some of the variants that are offered.

Each of these varieties has a distinctive appearance, texture, or flavor. The Bakdal tree, a substantial hardwood tree, is where the name of the Bakdal snow crab comes from. The crab had a firm shell and a definite gold color. Due to their exceptional quality and the difficulty of collecting them, which requires specialized boats because they are 500–700 meters deep in the ocean, these crabs have quality mark tags on one of their legs that have been approved by the Ship Owners' Association.

The Yeongdeok variant of Snow Crab

The Yeongdeok variant has a white shell in the front and brown at the back and comparatively long legs for its body. This variety has more meat and is chewy with a much lighter taste. These crabs are sold for significantly less if one or two of their legs are gone. In addition to being less expensive than other fish, Hongge daege is distinguished by its scarlet body color, firm shell, salty flavor, and salty taste. On the other hand, Neodo snow crabs, which are typical snow crabs, have an intermediate colour with Hongge snow crab. Due to its blue hue, it is also known as blue snow crab, and it is relatively meatier and tastier than Honggae crab.

== Yeongdeok Snow Crab Village and Street ==
The crab village is located on the coast of the Sea of Japan. This village is a traditional fishing village and home to Yeongdeok snow crabs, well known from the Goryeo period. The streets are huge to accommodate the around 100 plus shops selling crabs along the Ganggu port. A gigantic red snow crab structure above Ganggu Bridge is built to welcome visitors.

Even though snow crab is caught in various parts of the Sea of Japan, including Pohang, Uljin, Gangneung, and Samchoek, the term "Yeongdeok snow crab" is commonly used to refer to it. In the past, all of the snow crabs caught in different sea locations were brought to Yeongdeok, unloaded, and then delivered to other locations due to a lack of transportation infrastructure. The National Federation of Fisheries Cooperatives auction commences following the unloading of the snow crab from the fishing boats at the Suhyeop sales site in Ganggu port. The largest snow crab distribution hub in the nation, Ganggu Port in this region handles 500 tonnes of snow crab annually.

Panoramic view of the Yeongdeok Snow Crab Street

170 restaurants serving snow crab are scattered along the streets around Ganggu Port. Some eateries procure their snow crabs straight from the port's auction site. Restaurants offer customers the chance to select a live snow crab which is then cooked and served to them by placing crabs on display outside the doors; they also steamed crabs outside the doors in pots. The number of boats that bring them and the crabs' condition are two elements that have a significant impact on the price of raw snow crab. Steamed snow crab daege jjim paired with crab soup and fried rice is a popular snow crab meal combination.

== Health benefits ==
The important elements amino acids, calcium, phosphorus, iron, and lysine, to name a few, are abundant in snow crabs. Snow crab is good for the elderly, frail, and patients because of its low fat content, which makes it simpler to digest. It is also suggested that students consume snow crab in order to maintain good health. Lysine in snow crab helps improve osteoporosis and cataracts in addition to improving and strengthening immunity. This snow crab's shell also includes chitosan, which promotes low cholesterol and prevents the buildup of body fat, making it a potential weight-control and anti-aging food. These qualities make chitosan useful in the medical, cosmetic, and agricultural industries.

== Yeongdeok Snow Crab Dishes ==
Daege Jjim served at a restaurant in the Snow Crab Street

Yeongdeok snow crab is eaten by breaking and removing the leg meat with the mouth or by using a crab fork. Next, the body is cracked open, the gills are removed, and the meat is placed in the crab shell and mixed well with the insides and the juice. The meaty and not-so-salty Yeongdeok snow crab are eaten with rice, seaweed flakes, and sesame oil in the crab shell.

=== Daege tang ===
Daege tang literally translates into snow crab soup. This soup is served hot with steamed snow crab. The meat of the snow crab is removed from the legs of steamed Yeongdeok snow crab. Along with this course meal, gejang bap is also served.

Daege jjim

Daege jjim is steamed snow crab. This is prepared by steaming the crab between 120 °C and 130 °C, making sure the crab’ stomach is facing up, until the shell turns red.

Gejang bap

Gejang bap is rice-marinated crab, a delicacy served in a steamed snow crab course meal. Apart from these Daege bibimbap, Daege shabu-shabu, Daege hoe (sliced raw snow crab), braised snow crab with fried rice, and Daege maeuntang (spicy snow crab stew)

== Snow Crab Festival ==
This annual festival usually takes place for five days around Ganggu port in March or April during the peak season for Yeongdeok snow crabs. Various events are conducted for visitors, and the best time for visitors to buy snow crab is at the public auction. The events consist of the Ganggu street festival, bell-ringing ceremony, ceremonial walk of Wanggeon, the founder of Goryeo, golden snow crab catching, cooking contest, auction, and local specialty market (Yeongdeok specialty promotion store), sponsored and managed by the Yeongdeok Snow Crab Festival Promotion Committee. The 23rd Snow Crab Festival was held online from 2020.12.01 to 2020.12.31 during the COVID pandemic. This year 2023 marked the 26th Yeongdeok Snow Crab Festival, held on 2023.02.24–2023.02.26.
