= The Best Cooking Secrets =

South Korean cooking show

- Promotional poster
- Hangul: 최고의 요리비결
- RR: Choegoui yoribigyeol
- MR: Ch'oegoŭi yoribigyŏl
- Genre: Cooking show
- Written by: Kim Jin-ah; Son Soo-an; Shin Ji-young
- Directed by: Kim Dong-joon
- Presented by: Hwang Kwang-hee
- Country of origin: South Korea
- Original language: Korean

Production
- Camera setup: Multi-camera
- Running time: 30 minutes

Original release
- Network: EBS 1TV
- Release: 2 October 2000 – February 24, 2023

The Best Cooking Secrets (Korean: 최고의 요리비결) is a South Korean cooking show that premiered on 2 October 2000 on EBS 1TV and airs from Monday to Friday at 10:50AM KST. It is the longest-running cooking program in South Korea. The program is hosted by Hwang Kwang-hee.

== Format ==
The Best Cooking Secrets format focuses on food preparations and giving instructions to the viewers on the best way to cook everyday meals. A different guest made up of chefs and celebrities will attend the show every week and demonstrate on how to make different dishes in every episodes. At the end of an episode, the host will taste the dish and give their opinions.

The cooking show airs for around 30 minutes from Monday to Friday at 10:50AM KST. A compilation of the week's episode airs on Saturday at 11:00AM KST.

== Hosts ==
The show had had twelve hosts since its inceptions:

- Kim Hye-young (2000–2002)
- Hwang Hyun-jung (2002–2004)
- Im Ho (2004)
- Jung Ae-ri (2004–2005)
- Jeong Ji-yeong (2005–2006)
- Kim Ji-ho (2006–2007)
- Myung Se-bin (2007–2008)
- Park Soo-hong (2008–2012)
- Yoon Hyung-bin (2012–2015)
- Hwang Kwanghee (2015–2017, 2022–2023)
- Leeteuk (2017–2020)
- Kim Dong-wan (2020–2022)

== Episodes ==
The Best Cooking Secrets first aired on 2 October 2000. As of March 2015, 2830 episodes were aired.

Year	Episodes	Originally released	
Year	Episodes	First released	Last released
2000	5	2 October 2000	6 October 2000
2001	171	26 February 2001	31 December 2001
2002	231	1 January 2002	31 December 2002
2003	168	1 January 2003	19 December 2003
2004	TBA	5 January 2004	31 December 2004
2005	TBA	3 January 2005	18 November 2005
2006	TBA	2 January 2006	29 December 2006
2007	TBA	1 January 2007	31 December 2007
2008	TBA	2 January 2008	31 December 2008
2009	TBA	1 January 2009	31 December 2009
2010	TBA	2 January 2010	31 December 2010
2011	TBA	3 January 2011	30 December 2011
2012	TBA	2 January 2012	31 December 2012
2013	TBA	1 January 2013	31 December 2013
2014	TBA	1 January 2014	31 December 2014
2015	TBA	1 January 2015	31 December 2015
2016	TBA	1 January 2016	30 December 2016
2017	TBA	2 January 2017	29 December 2017
2018	260	1 January 2018	31 December 2018
2019	TBA	1 January 2019	31 December 2019
2020	TBA	1 January 2020	TBA
