= Jang-jorim =

Korean dish made of beef and soy sauce

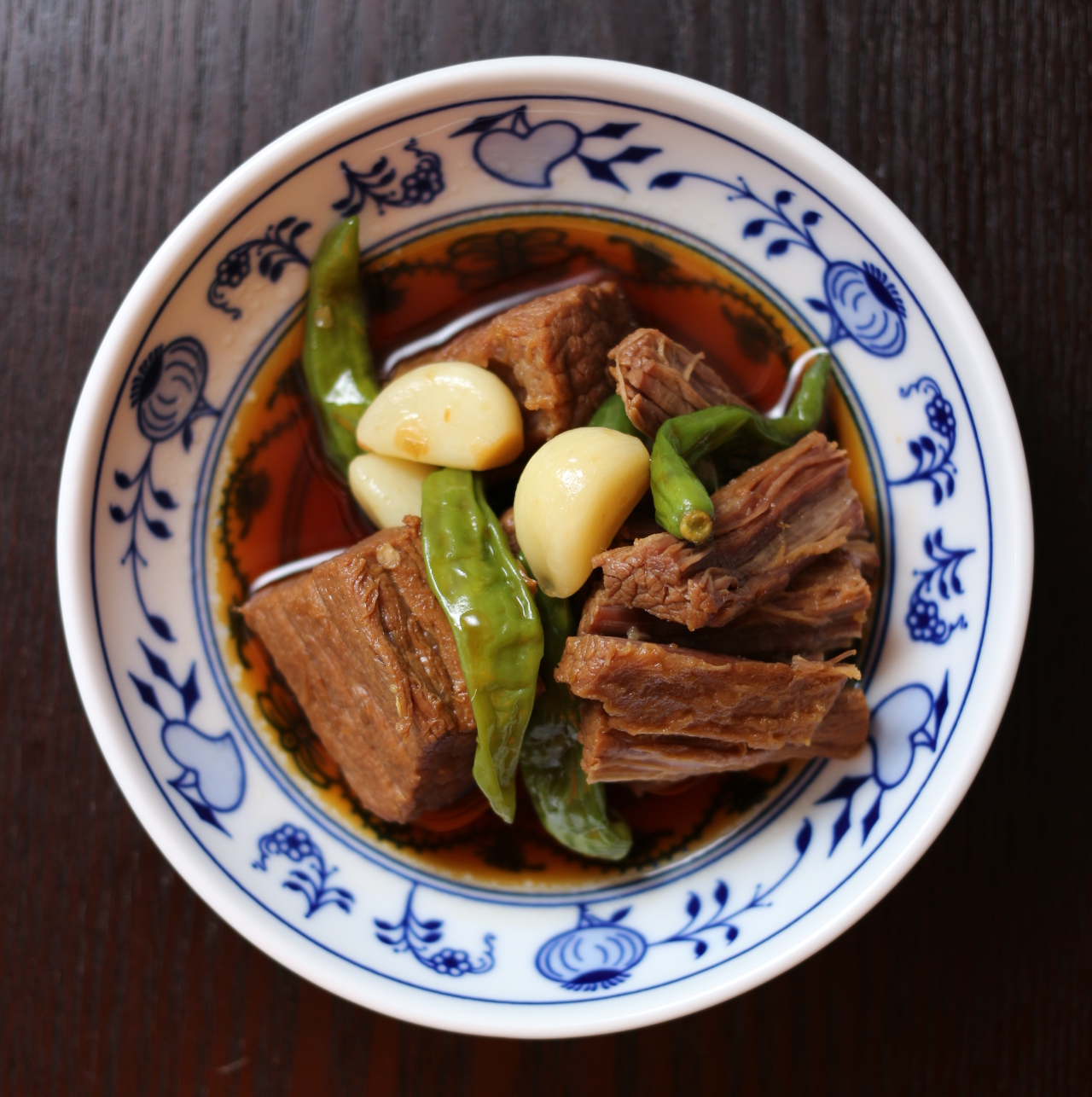
- Jang-jorim with peppers and whole garlic
- Type: Jorim (조림)
- Course: Banchan (반찬)
- Place of origin: Korea
- Main ingredients: Lean beef; Soy sauce
- Ingredients generally used: Eggs; Garlic; Ginger; Chili peppers; Mushrooms

Korean name
- Hangul: 장조림
- Hanja: 醬조림
- RR: jangjorim
- MR: changjorim

Jang-jorim (Korean: 장조림) is a Korean side dish consisting of lean beef braised in soy sauce with eggs. Jang-jorim is a type of jorim, a Korean simmered dish that preserves well. The side dish is commonly packed in lunch boxes in South Korea and is sold at South Korean convenience stores as a lunchtime dish. The dish can also be made using mushrooms, quail eggs, and green peppers.

== History ==
The first known description of jang-jorim is in Volume 128 of the Veritable Records of the Joseon Dynasty, where it describes a dish called damhae (Korean: 담해; Hanja: 醓醢) made by slicing beef and braising it in soy sauce.

== Description ==
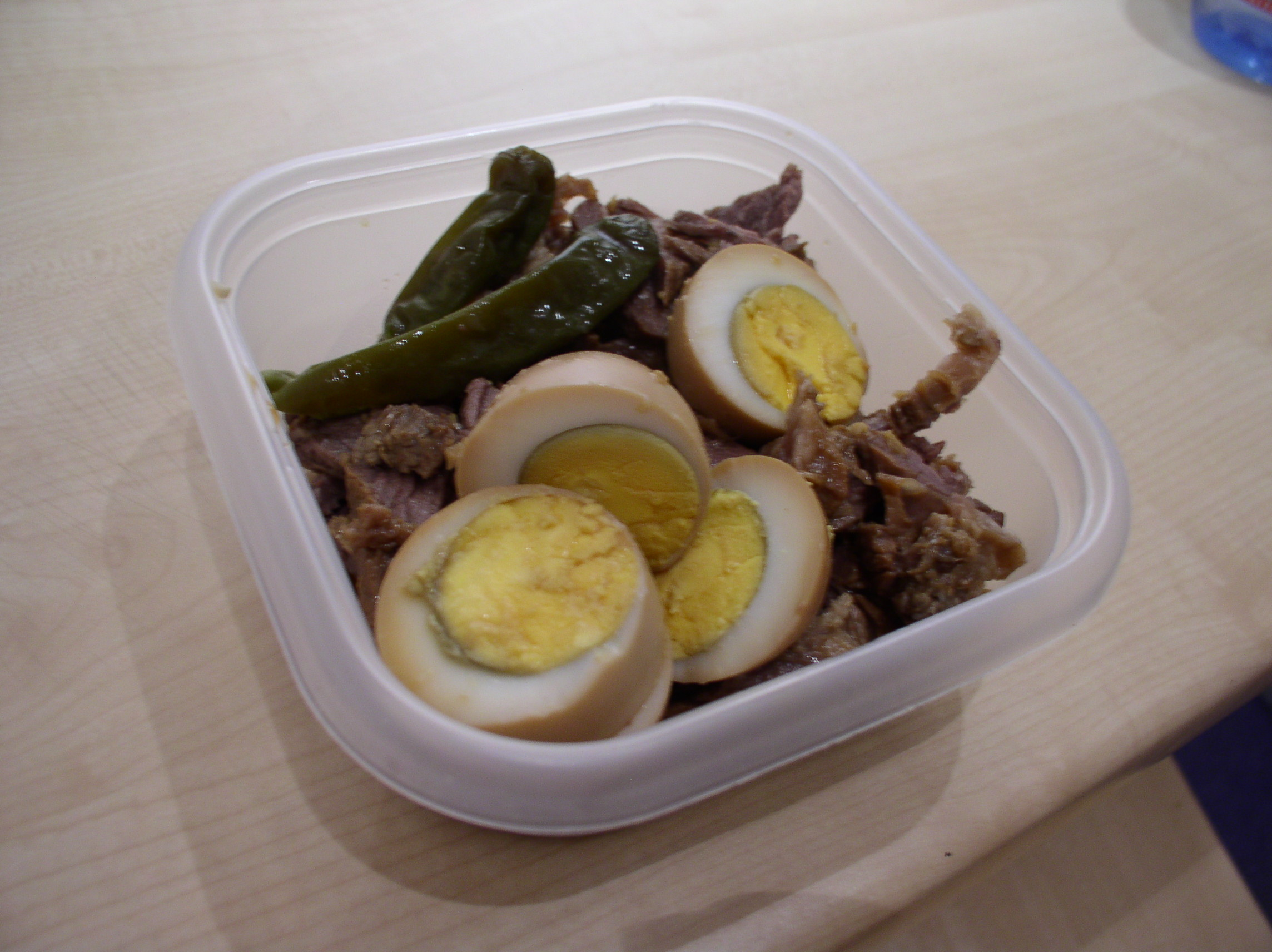
Jang-jorim with eggs

The dish is made by simmering small chunks of lean beef first in water, skimming off any scum. Once the beef is cooked, the meat is simmered in soy sauce along with a mixture of garlic, ginger, and sugar. When served, the meat is shredded along the grain, and drizzled with the braising liquid to re-moisten the meat. The dish preserves well in the fridge, and is typically served cold with other side dishes.

== See also ==
- Korean cuisine
- Korean royal court cuisine
