= Andong jjimdak =

Korean chicken dish originating from Andong

Andong-jjimdak
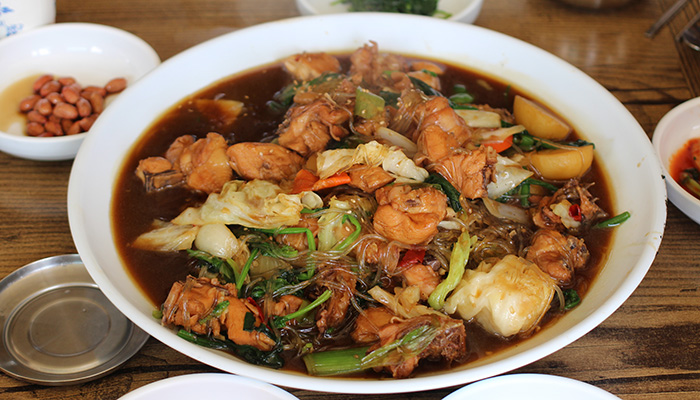
- Type: Jjim
- Place of origin: Korea
- Main ingredients: Chicken

Korean name
- Hangul: 안동찜닭
- Hanja: 安東찜닭
- RR: Andong jjimdak
- MR: Andong tchimdak
- IPA: an.doŋ.t͈ɕim.dak̚

Andong-jjimdak (Korean: 안동찜닭; lit. 'steamed chicken of Andong') is a variety of jjim (a Korean steamed or boiled dish), which originated in the city of Andong, North Gyeongsang province and is made with chicken, various vegetables marinated in a ganjang (Korean soy sauce) based sauce.

== Origin ==
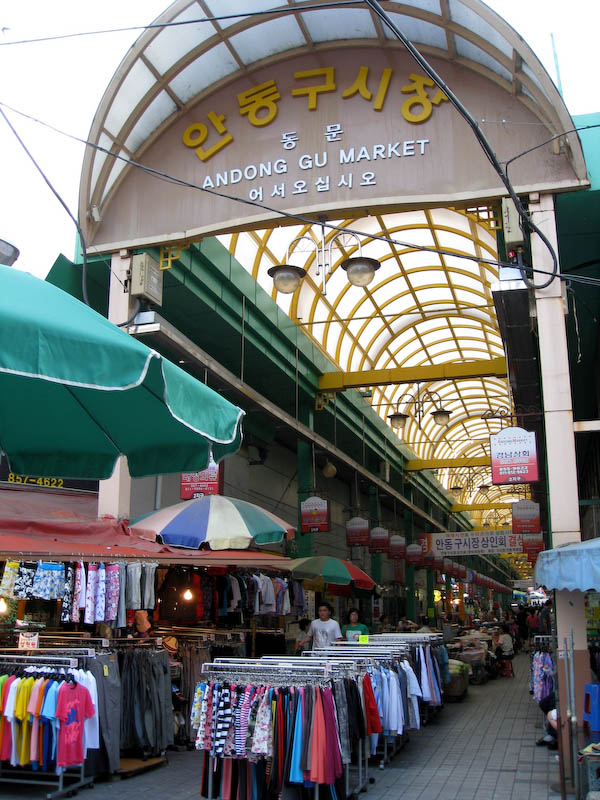
Andong Gu Market where Andong-jjimdak is believed to be originated

There are many speculations on the origin of the dish. One is that it is a specialty food of the inner rich village of Andong during the Joseon period, prepared and eaten for special occasions. Another assumption is that during the 1980s in the Dak golmok (닭골목, literally "chicken alley") of the "Andong Gu Market," restaurant owners there made a dish including ingredients that regulars demanded, which became the current Andong-jjimdak. The most plausible speculation among existing assumptions is that merchants of the Dak golmok at the market created the dish to keep their position against the rapid expansion of Western fried chicken shops.

== Preparations ==
Since Andong-jjimdak is cooked over high heat, it has less fat and can have various tastes by adding diverse ingredients according to recipe. It is popular among students and blue-collar workers due to the abundant portions compared to the price (generally around 20,000 won). Andong-jjimdak is also considered a nutritious dish due to the high protein content from the chicken, and various vitamins provided by the vegetables in the dish.

To make the dish, the broth is prepared first by boiling a cleaned chopped chicken, whole garlic, onions, ginger and a type of fresh green chili pepper called "Cheongyang gochu" (청양고추) altogether in a pot. The pepper is famous for its extreme spiciness and plays an important role in tasting the dish. Cellophane noodles are soaked in water. The cooked chicken is simmered with a sauce made from ganjang, mullyeot (물엿, syrup-like condiment), sugar, and pepper in the broth. Slices of shiitake, and diced carrots, potatoes, and other vegetables are added in the pot and boiled over high heat for ten minutes. Whilst the carrots and potatoes are almost getting cooked, a little amount of wheat flour and spinach, sliced cucumber, scallions and the noodles are added to the pot as well. After cooking, the dish is put on a plate and sesame seeds are spread over it.

== See also ==
- Korean cuisine
- Bokkeum
- Dak galbi
- Jjim
- List of chicken dishes
- List of steamed foods
