= Chuwolsan =

Mountain in South Korea

Highest point
- Elevation: 731 m (2,398 ft)
- Listing: Mountains of Korea
- Coordinates: 35°23′57″N 126°58′32″E

Geography
- Country: South Korea
- Provinces: North Jeolla and South Jeolla
- Counties: Sunchang and Damyang

Korean name
- Hangul: 추월산
- Hanja: 秋月山
- RR: Chuwolsan
- MR: Ch'uwŏlsan

Chuwolsan (Korean: 추월산) is a mountain of North Jeolla Province, western South Korea. It has an elevation of 731 metres.
