= Byeongpungsan (Jeonnam-Gwangju) =

Mountain in South Korea

Highest point
- Elevation: 822 m (2,697 ft)
- Coordinates: 35°19′29″N 126°53′09″E

Geography
- Location: Jeonnam-Gwangju, South Korea

Korean name
- Hangul: 병풍산
- Hanja: 屛風山
- RR: Byeongpungsan
- MR: Pyŏngp'ungsan

Byeongpungsan (Korean: 병풍산) is a mountain of Jeonnam-Gwangju, western South Korea. It has an elevation of 822 metres.

== See also ==
- List of mountains of Korea
