= Jjim =

Korean steamed or boiled dishes

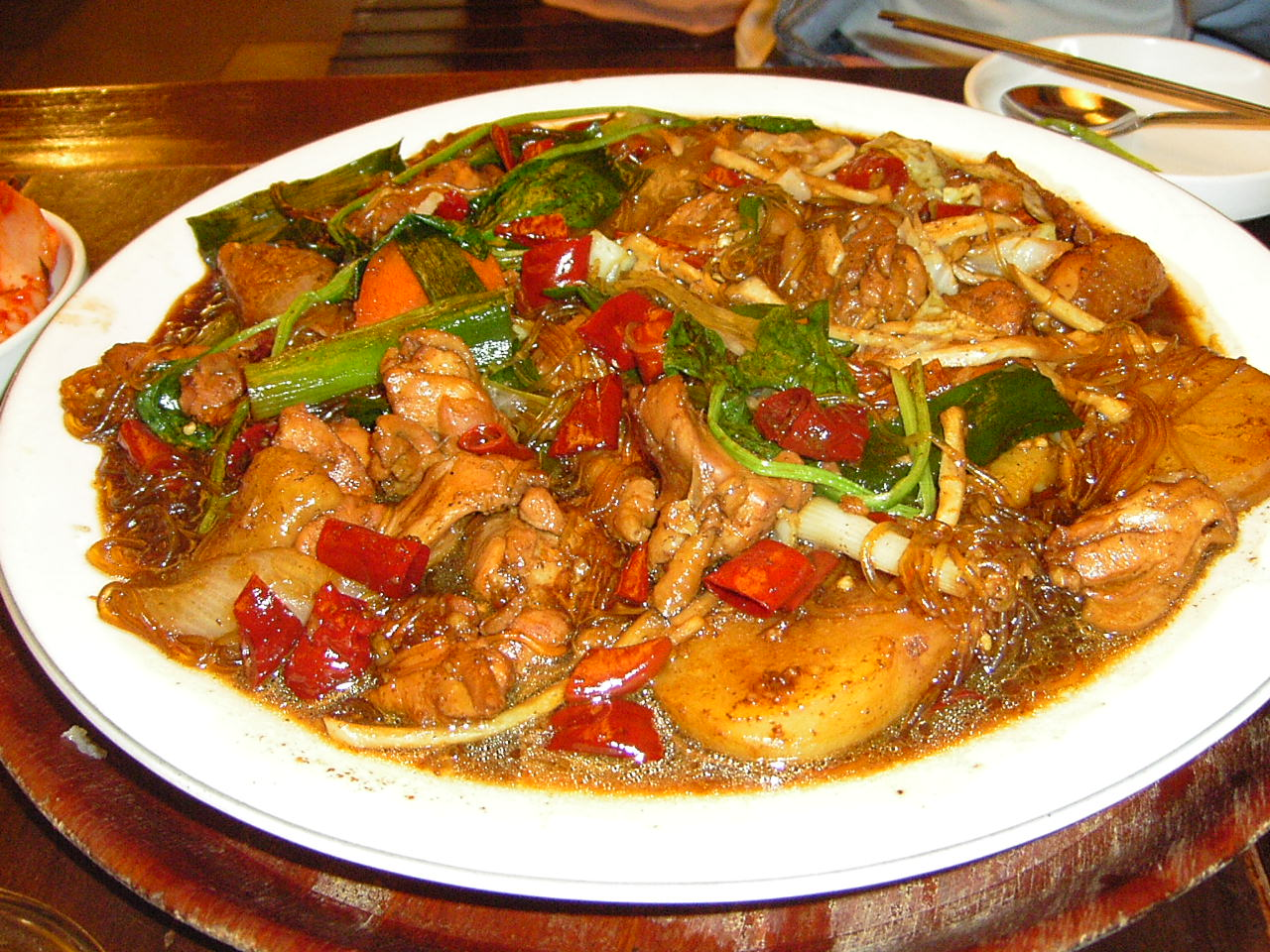
- Andong jjimdak, a variety of jjim dish

Korean name
- Hangul: 찜
- RR: jjim
- MR: tchim

Jjim (Korean: 찜; Korean pronunciation: [tɕ͈im]) is a Korean cuisine term referring to dishes made by steaming or boiling meat, chicken, fish, or shellfish which have been marinated in a sauce or soup. The cooking technique originally referred to dishes cooked in a siru (시루, earthenware steamer mainly used for making tteok) by steaming. However, the name jjim has now come to imply a finished dish with a steamed appearance. The cooking method for most jjim dishes nowadays has changed to boiling the ingredients in broth and reducing the liquid. Pressure cookers are popular for making jjim as well.

Proteins galbi, beef shank or rump, chicken, fish, or shellfish are usually the main ingredients. The ingredients are marinated in a sauce, then put to a boil with a small amount of water. The liquid is then reduced. Various vegetables and other ingredients are added for enhanced flavor.

== Varieties ==
- Galbi-jjim (갈비찜), made by steaming marinated galbi (beef short ribs) with diced potato and carrots in ganjang sauce.
- Andong jjimdak (찜닭), made by steaming chicken with vegetables and cellophane noodles in ganjang (간장, soy) sauce.
- Gyeran-jjim (계란찜), made with eggs
- Saengseon jjim (생선찜), made with fish
  - Agu-jjim (아구찜), made by steaming marinated blackmouth angler, stalked Sea Squirt, kongnamul (soybean sprouts), and minari (미나리, Oenanthe javanica). It is a local specialty of Masan, South Gyeongsang Province.
  - Domi-jjim (도미찜), made with sea bream
  - Eundaegu-jjim (은대구찜), made with cod
- Jeonbok-jjim (전복찜), made with abalone marinated in a mixed sauce of ganjang (Korean soy sauce) and cheongju (rice wine)
- Dubu-jjim (두부찜), made with tofu
- Tteokbokki (떡볶이), made with tteok

== Gallery ==
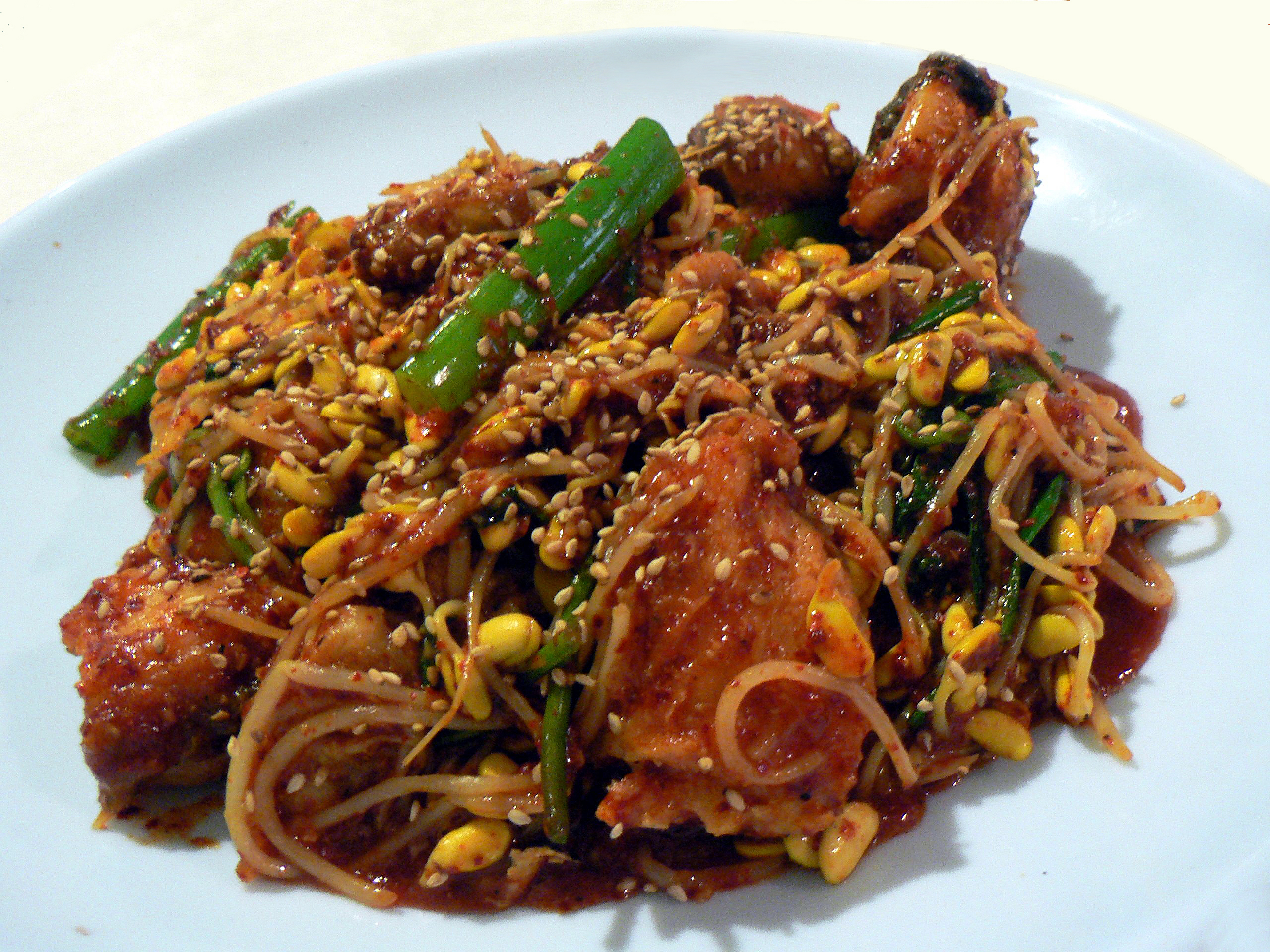
Agwi-jjim (blackmouth angler jjim)

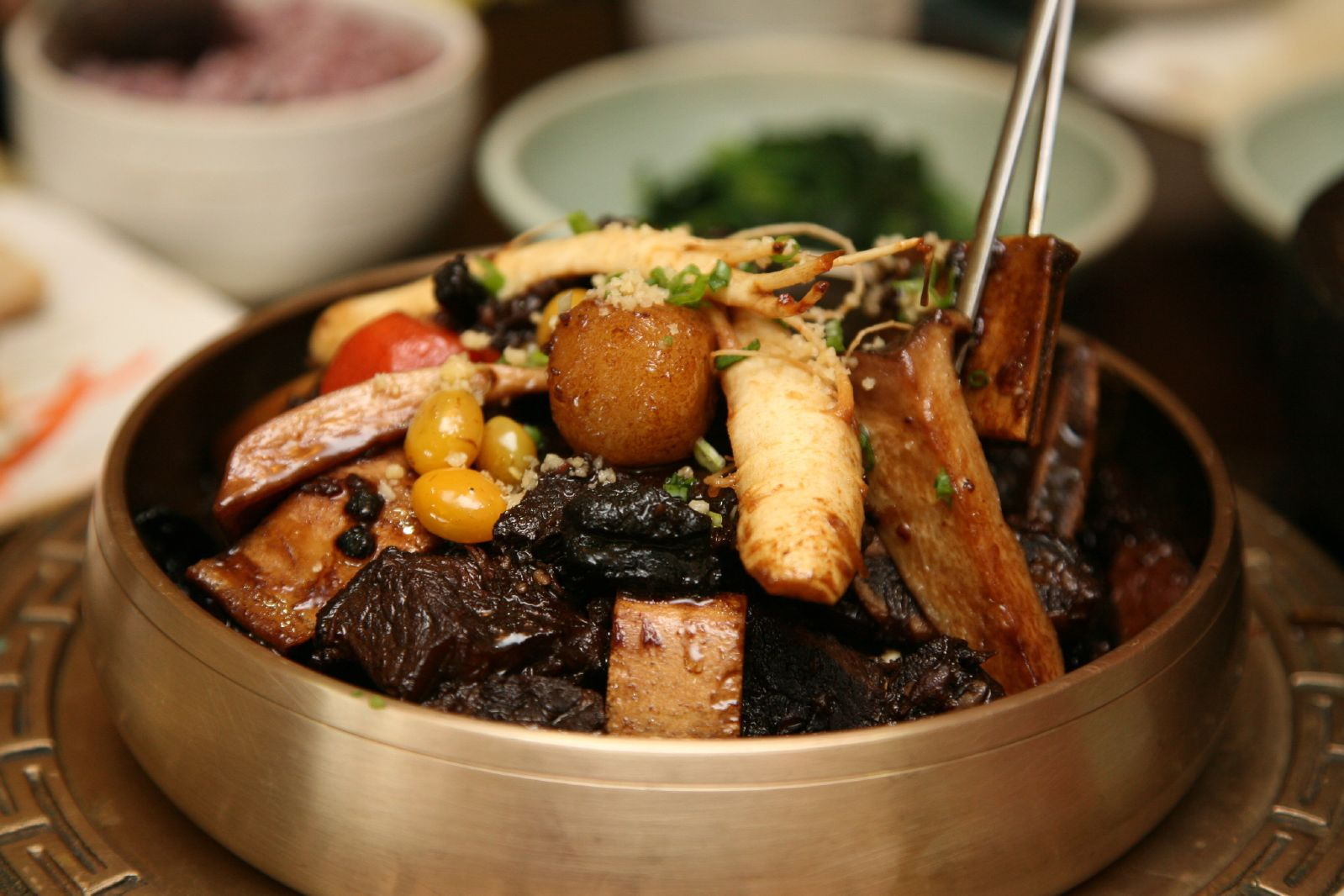
Galbi-jjim (beef rib jjim)

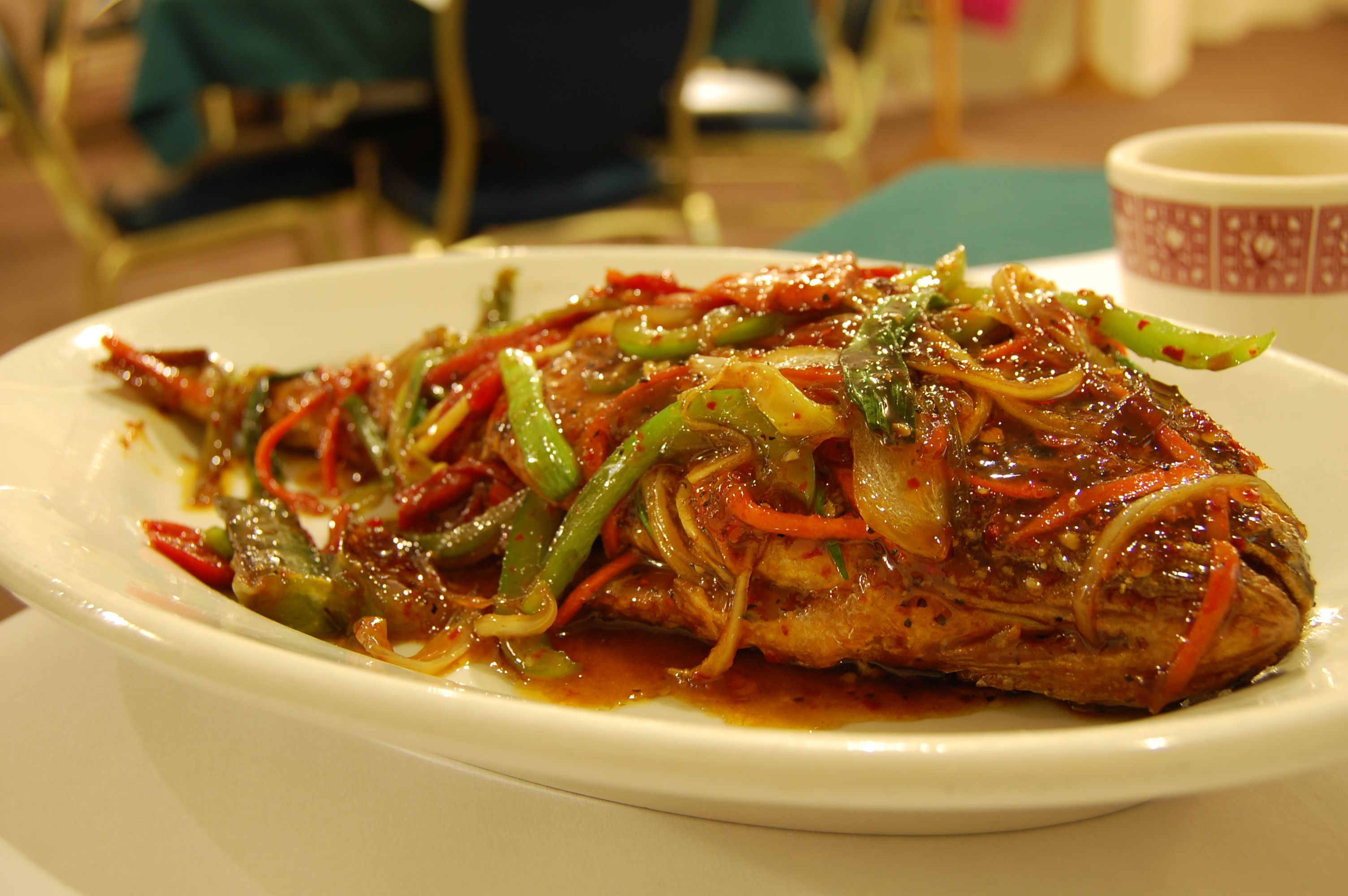
Jogi-jjim (yellow croaker jjim)

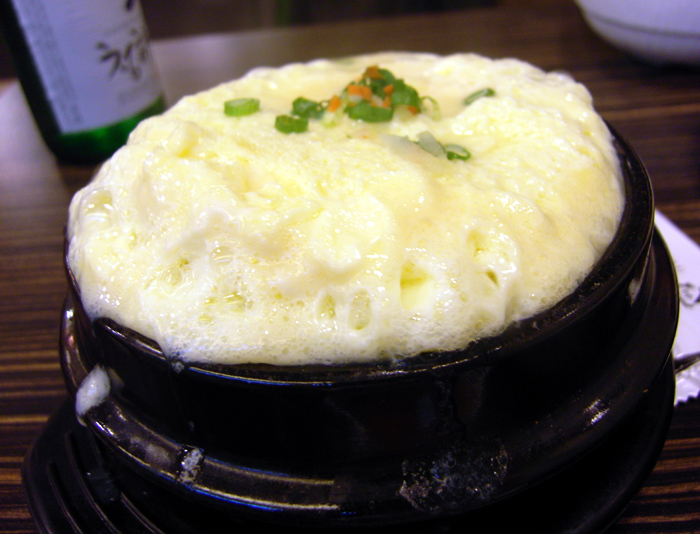
Gyeran-jjim (egg jjim)

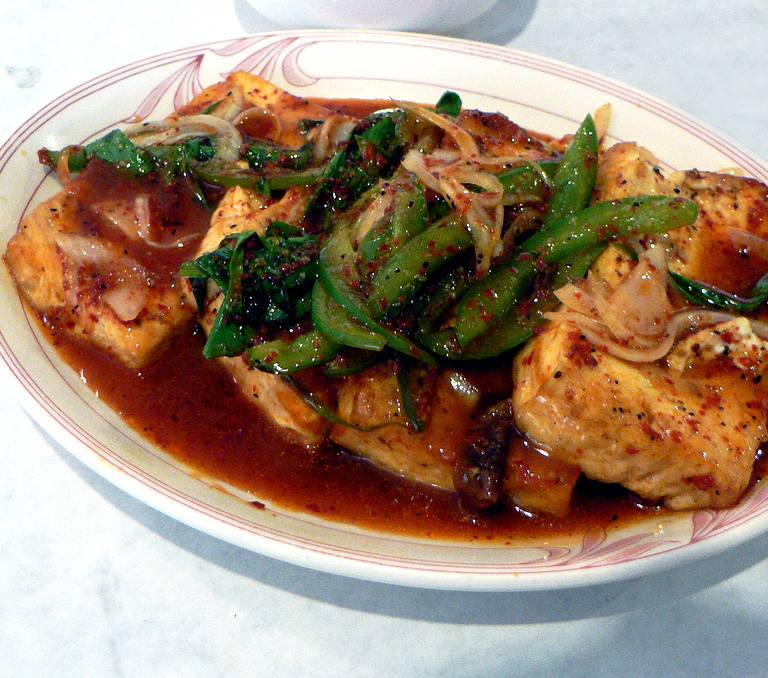
Dubu-jjim (tofu jjim)

== See also ==
- Seon, steamed stuffed vegetable dish
- Jorim, braised dishes
- Bokkeum, stir-fried dishes
- Korean cuisine
- List of steamed foods
