= Tteok-galbi =

Korean grilled short rib patties

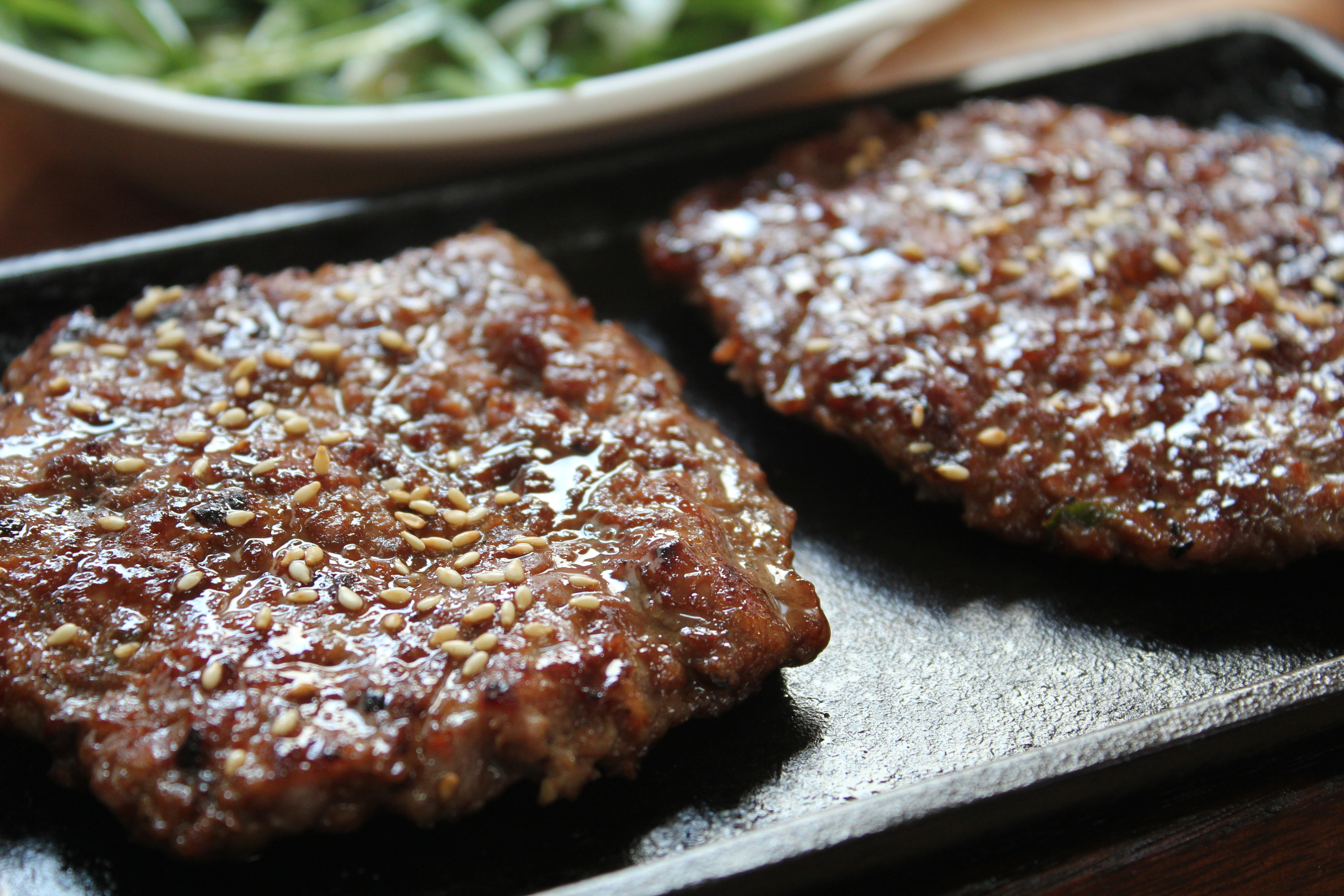
- Alternative names: Grilled short rib patties
- Type: Galbi, patty
- Place of origin: Korea
- Associated cuisine: Korean cuisine, Korean royal court cuisine

Korean name
- Hangul: 떡갈비
- RR: tteokgalbi
- MR: ttŏkkalbi
- IPA: [t͈ʌk̚.k͈al.bi]

Tteok-galbi (Korean: 떡갈비) or grilled short rib patties is a Korean beef dish made with minced beef short ribs. Originally a royal dish, tteok-galbi is now a local specialty of Gyeonggi Province in the central-west region and South Jeolla Province in the south-west region of the Korean Peninsula.

== Etymology ==
Tteok-galbi (떡갈비), literally translated to "cake ribs" as tteok (떡) means "rice (or other grain) cake" and galbi (갈비) means "rib". The name comes from the food's similarity in appearance to tteok. The process of kneading and shaping the meat is similar to the process of making a rice cake. The final dish is also soft and tender, much like a rice cake in texture.

The word tteok-galbi has a relatively short history that starts in the late 1960s to early 1970s. Before that, the dish was called hyo-galbi (효갈비), meaning "filial piety ribs", or no-galbi (노갈비), meaning "elder ribs", as it was often a dish for older people whose teeth were too weak to bite off meat from the rib bones. The term may have been coined at the historic restaurant Sinsikdang. Both the terms hyo-galbi and no-galbi were used during the Joseon era (1392–1897).

== History ==
Tteok-galbi was a beef dish in Korean royal court cuisine. One story says the dish was created because it was not befitting for kings to gnaw on galbi-gui (grilled short ribs). Recipes from Gyeonggi Province that char-grill the beef are said to have been imparted from court ladies in the late Joseon era, while the recipes from South Jeolla Province were reportedly passed on by scholarly-officials in exile. The Damyang tteok-galbi, passed on by Song Hŭigyŏng (1376–1446) is the most famous among them.

In modern South Korea, tteok-galbi is also made with ingredients mixed with or other than beef, such as pork and duck. Tteok-galbi made with half beef and half pork was first created and sold by Choe Jeo-ja in the 1950s, in Songjeong, Gwangju, South Korea. Now there is a "tteok-galbi street" specializing in the half beef and half pork dish in the Songjeong area. Ori-tteok-galbi (오리떡갈비), made with duck meat, is a popular dish in Gwangju.

== Preparation ==
Meat is separated from beef short ribs, finely minced, and marinated with various seasonings and aromatics, such as salt, ground black pepper, ginger juice, soy sauce, minced garlic, minced onion, cheongju (rice wine), sugar, and sesame oil. The marinade is boiled, sifted, and cooled beforehand. The marinated meat is shaped and attached back to the rib bones using a small amount of wheat flour as glue, and char-grilled over oak. Once on the gridiron, the meat patty is brushed with the sauce while it is grilled.

Songjeong tteok-galbi is made by shaping a mixture of beef and pork into rectangles and grilling. Pork is added to make it fattier since the beef is too dry by itself. The recipe of Choe Jeo-ja calls for hand-kneading the meat for a long time in a seasoning made from nearly 20 ingredients including dasima (kelp), pear and honey. The sauce is intermittently brushed on the meat while it is slowly grilled over charcoal.

== Eating ==
Chopsticks are used to cut tteok-galbi.

== See also ==
- Frikadeller
- Hamburg steak
- Meatloaf
- Patty
- Salisbury steak
