= Jorim =

Category of Korean simmered dish

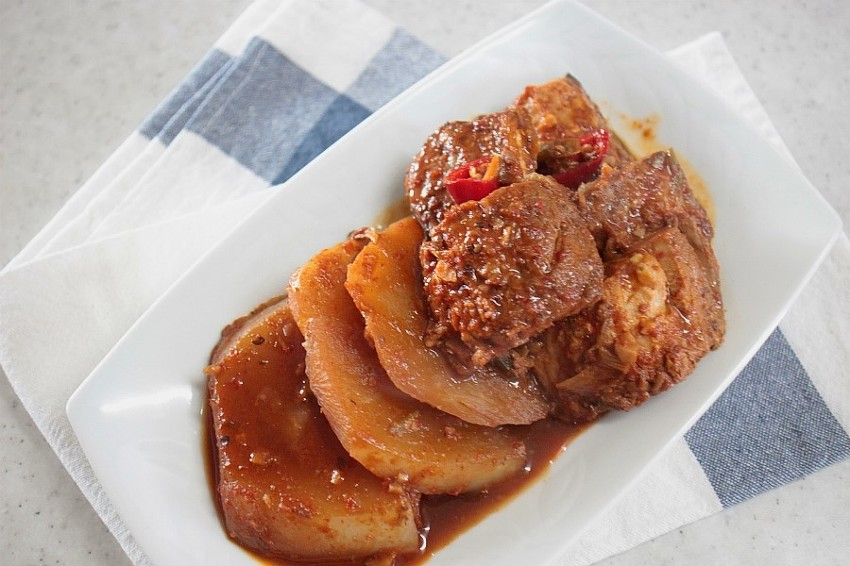
- Godeungeo-jorim (simmered chub mackerel)
- Place of origin: Korea
- Associated cuisine: Korean cuisine
- Similar dishes: Nimono

Korean name
- Hangul: 조림
- RR: jorim
- MR: chorim
- IPA: [tɕo.ɾim]

Jorim (Korean: 조림) is a category of dishes in Korean cuisine, made by simmering vegetables, meat, fish, seafood, or tofu in seasoned broth until the liquid is absorbed into the ingredients and reduced down. Jorim dishes are usually soy sauce-based, but gochujang (pepper paste) or gochugaru (pepper flakes) can also be added, especially when fishier, red-fleshed fish such as mackerel, saury, or hairtail are used. In Korean royal court cuisine, jorim is called jorini (조리니).

== Etymology ==
Jorim is a verbal noun derived from the Korean verb jorida (조리다; "to boil down"). Although it was a commonly used culinary technique, the term did not appear until the 18th century, due to the slow development of culinary terminology. Instead, jorim dishes were classified as jochi, a category that encompasses jjim and jjigae as well as jorim. The first mention of the verbal noun jorim as a food category appeared in Siuijeonseo, a 19th-century cookbook, in describing jang-jorim (soy sauce simmered beef) methods.

== Varieties ==
- dubu-jorim (두부조림) – simmered tofu
- galchi-jorim (갈치조림) – simmered largehead hairtail
- gamja-jorim (감자조림) – simmered potatoes
- godeungeo-jorim (고등어조림) – simmered chub mackerel and radish
- Jang-jorim (장조림) – simmered soy sauce simmered beef
- kkaennip-jorim (깻잎조림) – simmered perilla leaves
- kkongchi-jorim (꽁치조림) – simmered saury
- ueong-jorim (우엉조림) – simmered burdock roots
- yeongeun-jorim (연근조림) – simmered lotus roots

== Gallery ==
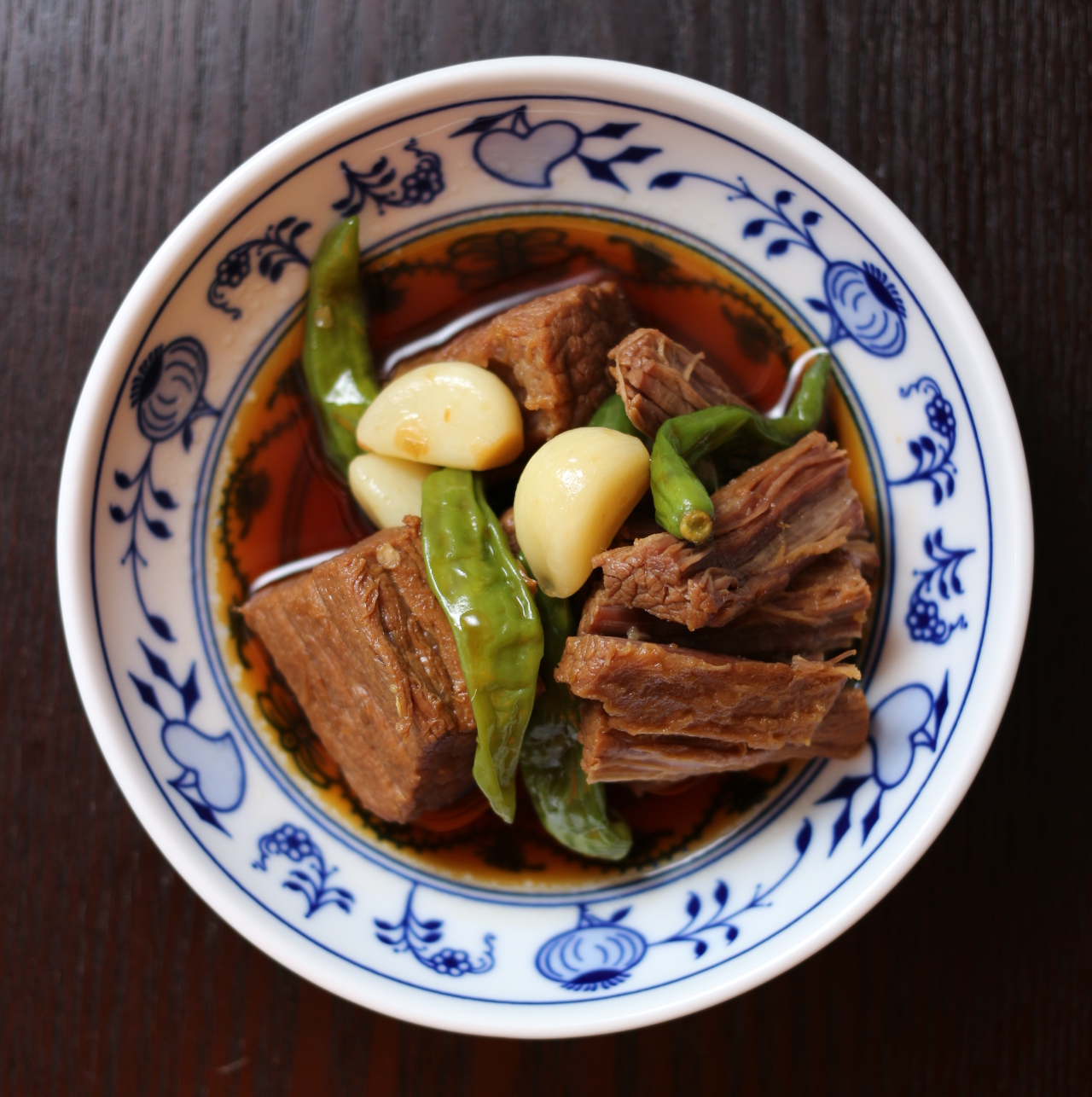
Jang-jorim (soy sauce simmered beef)

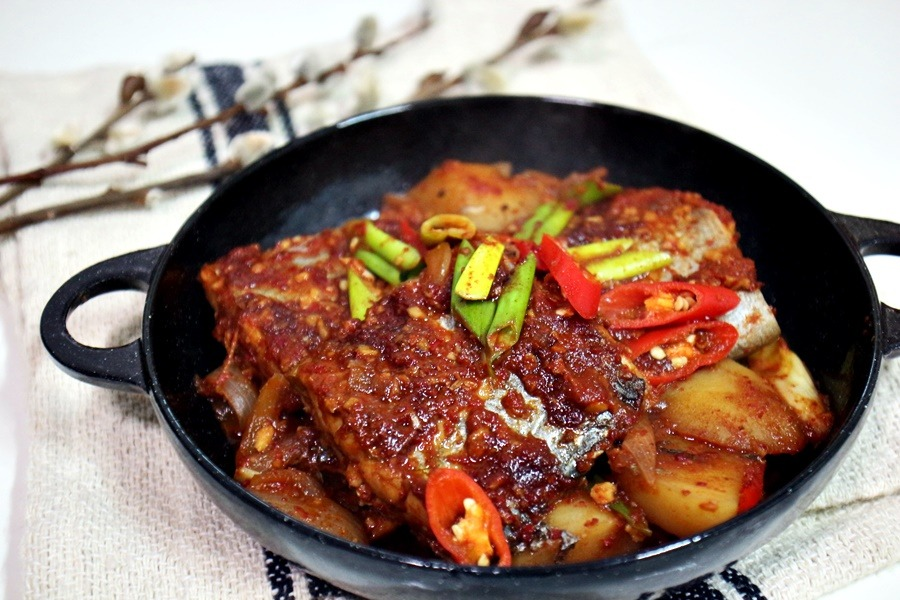
Galchi-jorim (simmered hairtail)

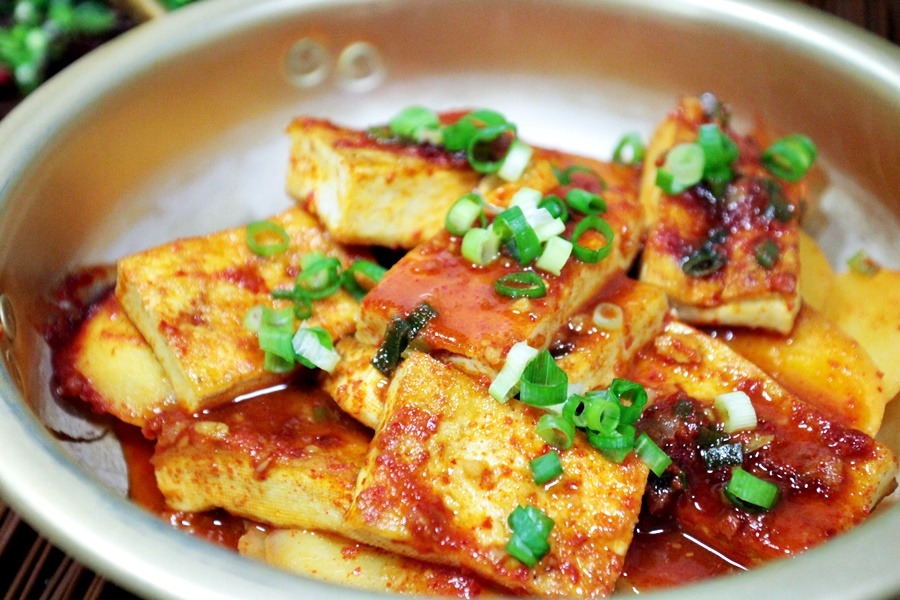
Dubu-jorim (simmered tofu)

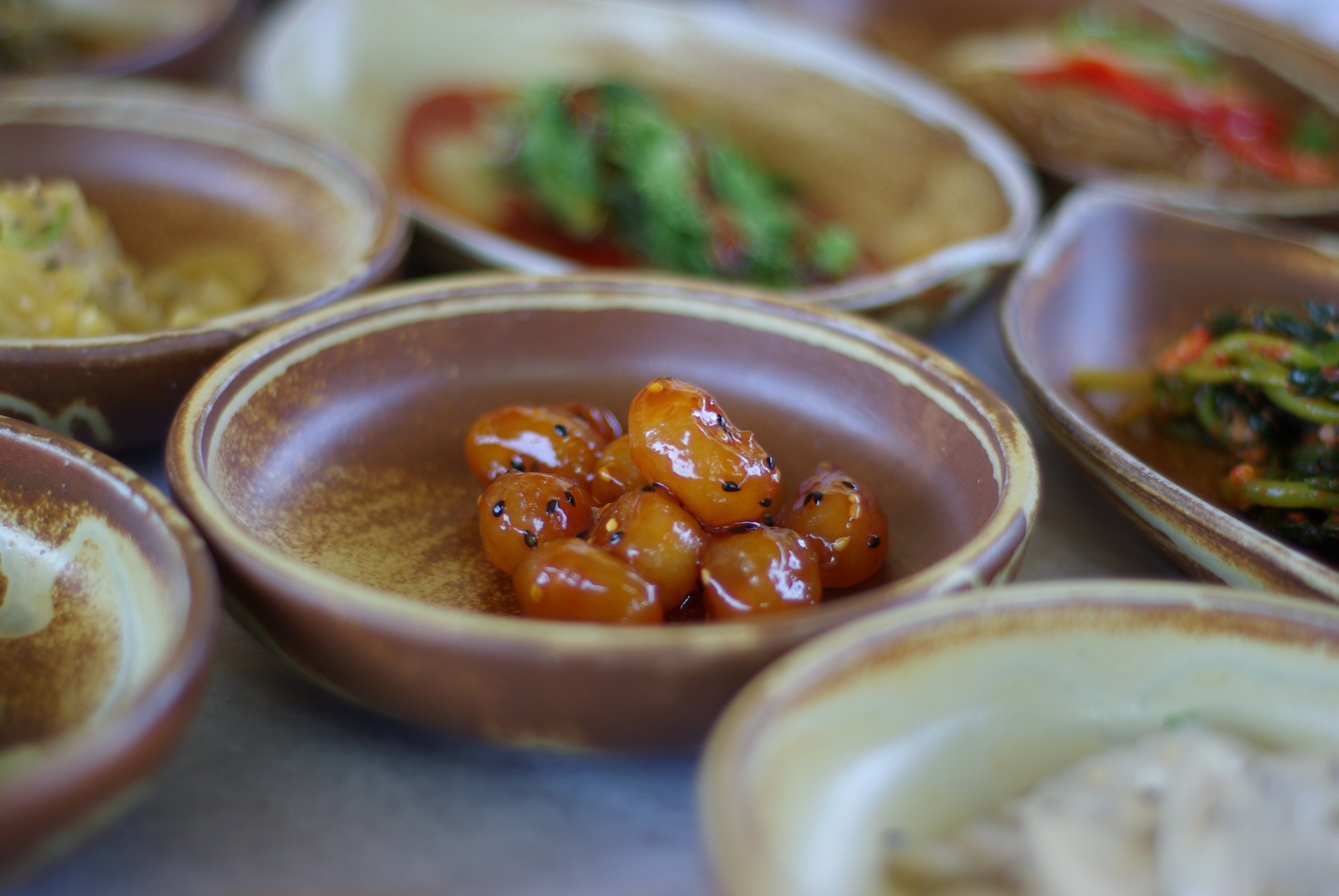
Gamja-jorim (simmered potatoes)

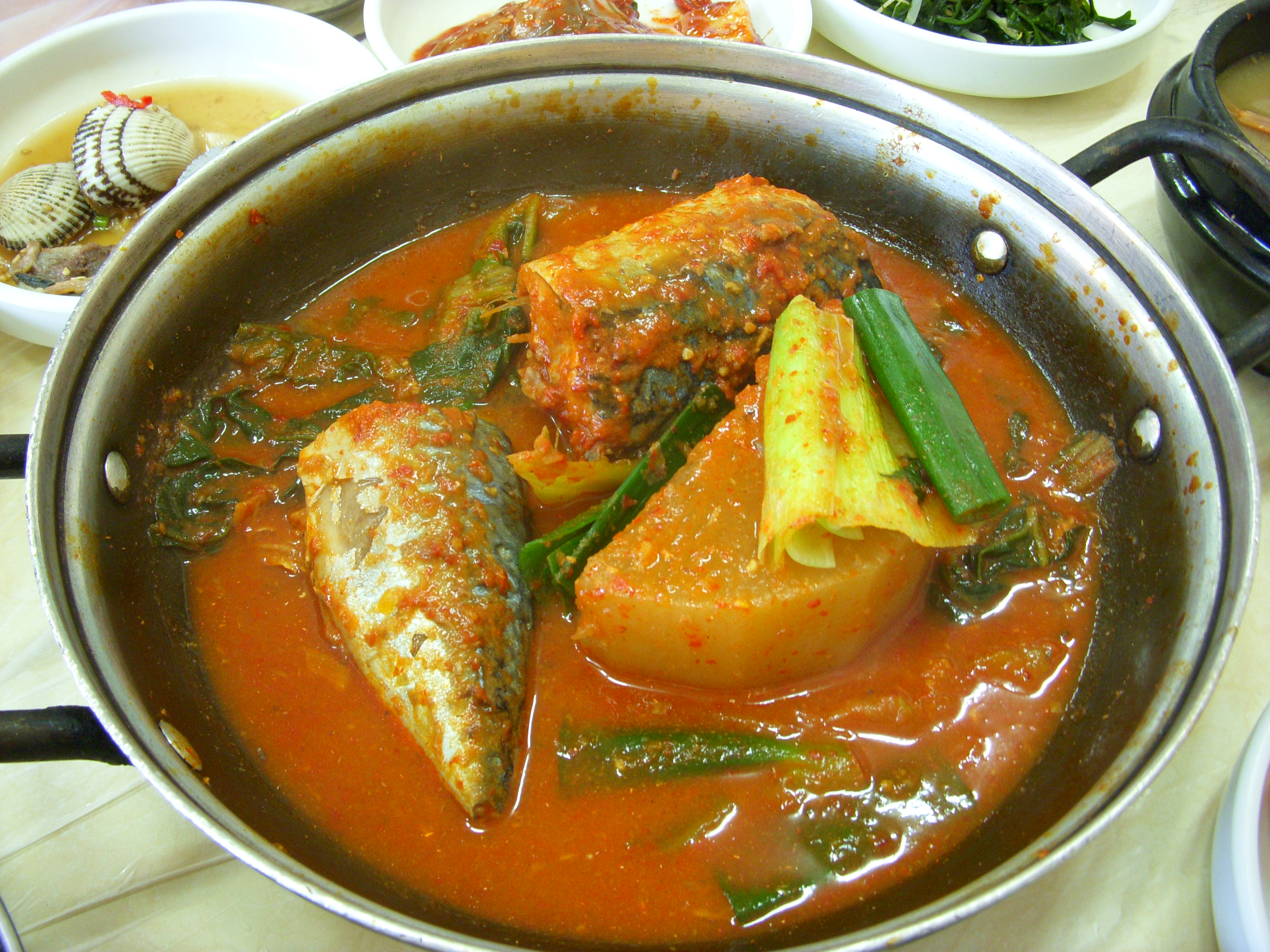
Godeungeo-jorim (simmered mackerel)

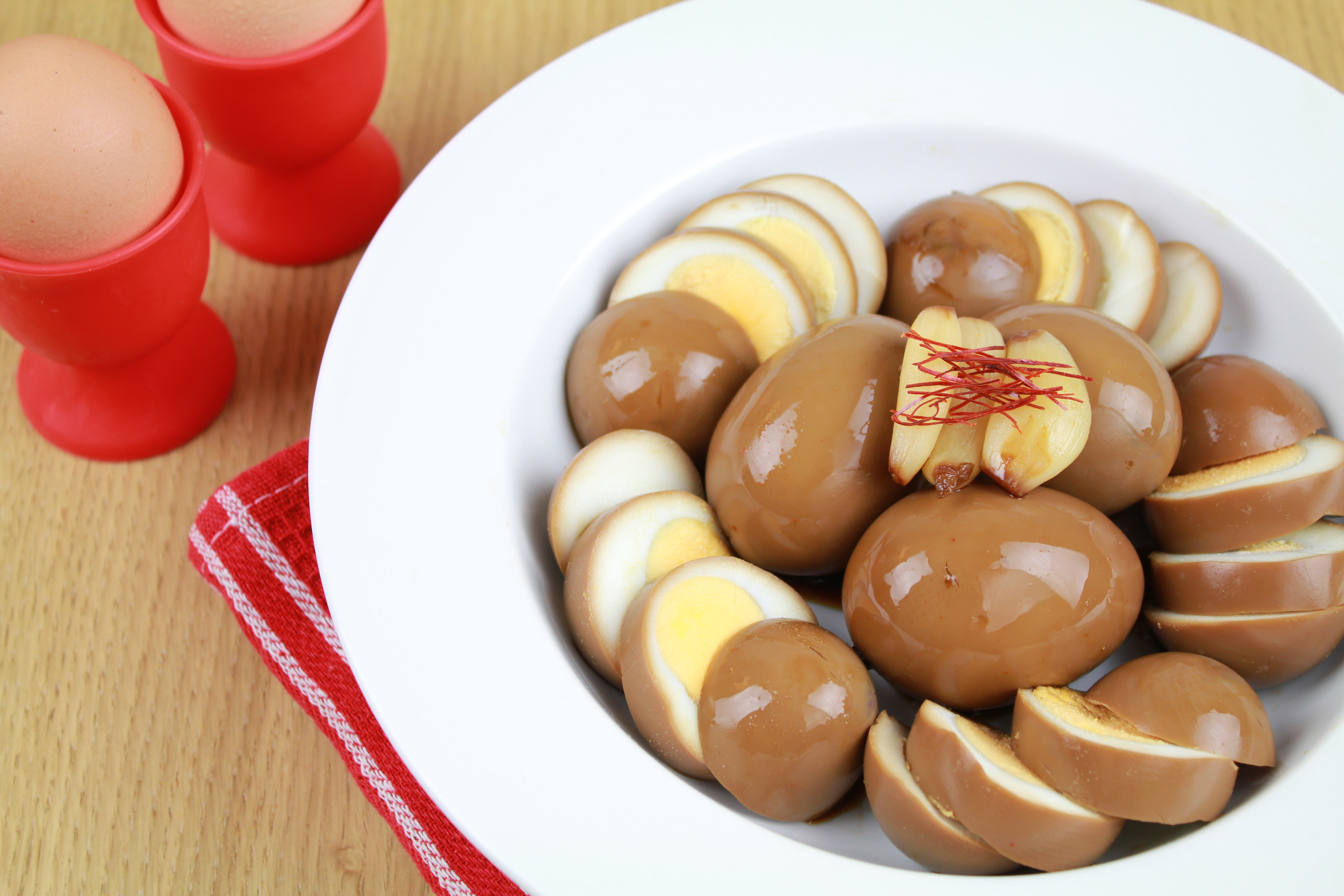
Gyeran-jang-jorim (soy sauce simmered eggs)

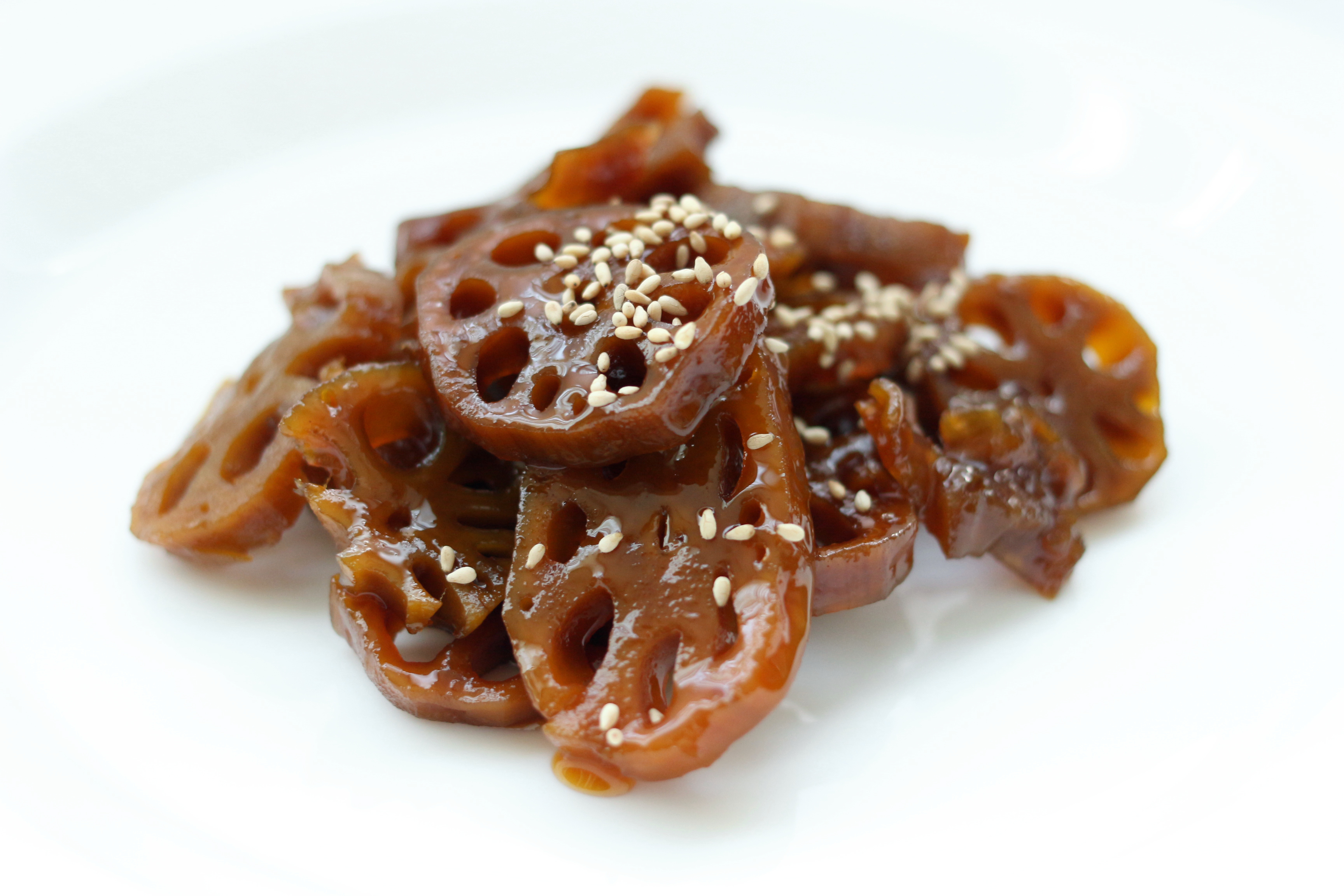
Yeongeun-jorim (simmered lotus roots)

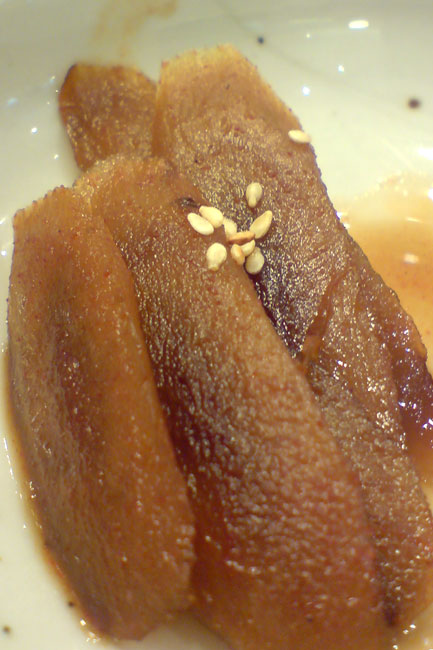
Ueong-jorim (simmered burdock roots)

== See also ==
- Braising
- Jjim
- Kho
