= Damyang County =

Damyang
- County
- Damyang Meta Provence in Damyang-eup

- Flag Emblem of Damyang

- Location in South Korea
- Coordinates: 35.3189°N 126.9839°E
- Country: South Korea
- Region: Honam
- Provincial-level city: Jeonnam-Gwangju
- Administrative divisions: 1 eup, 11 myeon

Area
  - Total: 455.09 km^{2} (175.71 sq mi)

Population (September 2024)
  - Total: 44,800
  - Density: 121/km^{2} (310/sq mi)
  - Dialect: Jeolla

Korean name
- Hangul: 담양군
- Hanja: 潭陽郡
- RR: Damyang-gun
- MR: Tamyang-gun

Damyang County (Korean: 담양군) is a county in Jeonnam-Gwangju, South Korea. Tourism is a major local industry. Notable local products include bamboo goods and strawberries.

Damyang is not to be confused with Danyang, which is located in eastern North Chungcheong Province.

== Geography ==
The county comprises one eup (Damyang-eup, the seat), and eleven myeon (Bongsan-myeon, Changpyeong-myeon, Daedeok-myeon, Daejeon-myeon, Geumseong-myeon, Goseo-myeon, Mujeong-myeon, Nam-myeon, Subok-myeon, Wolsan-myeon, Yong-myeon).

=== Mountains ===
Chuwolsan and Byeongpungsan are popular hiking destinations. Also notable for its fortress (Geumseongsanseong): Geumseongsan.

== Flora ==
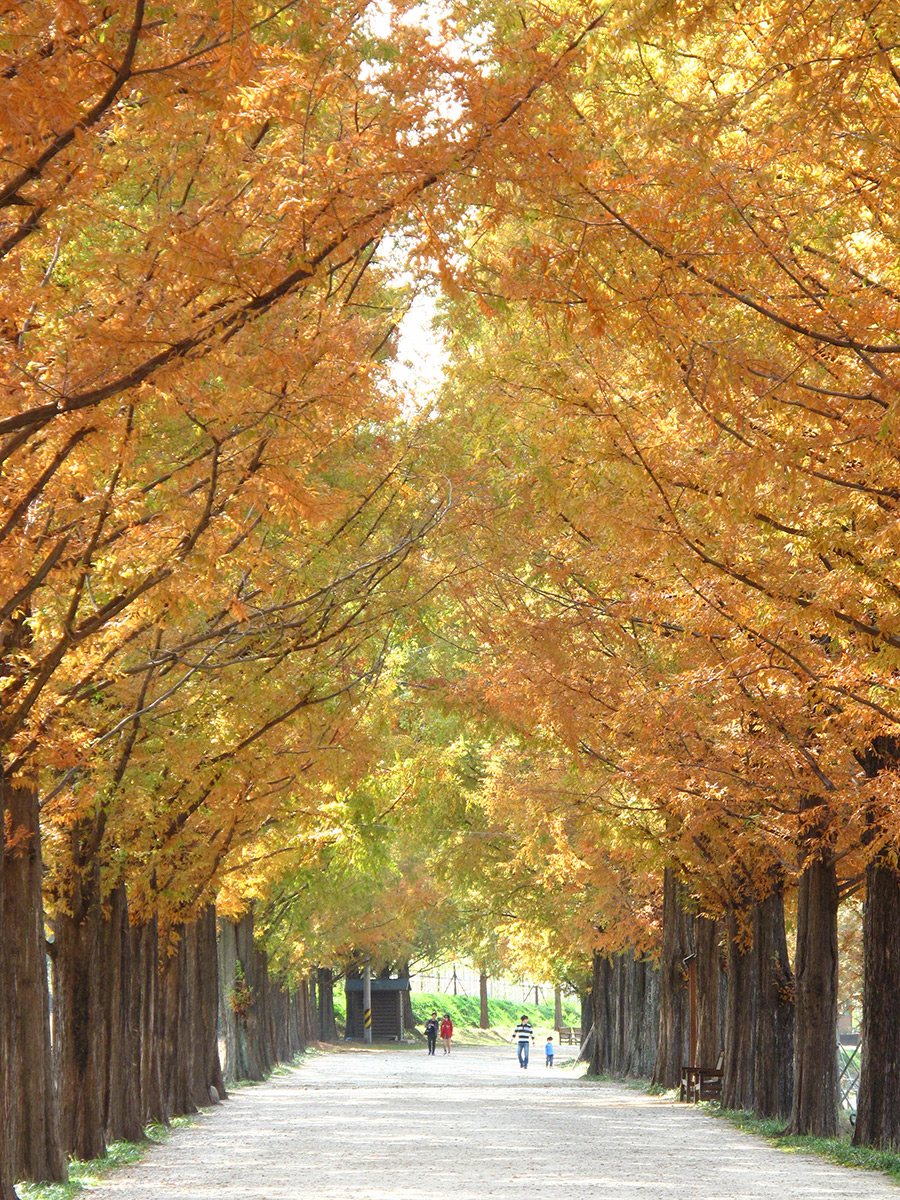
Metasequoia trees in early November

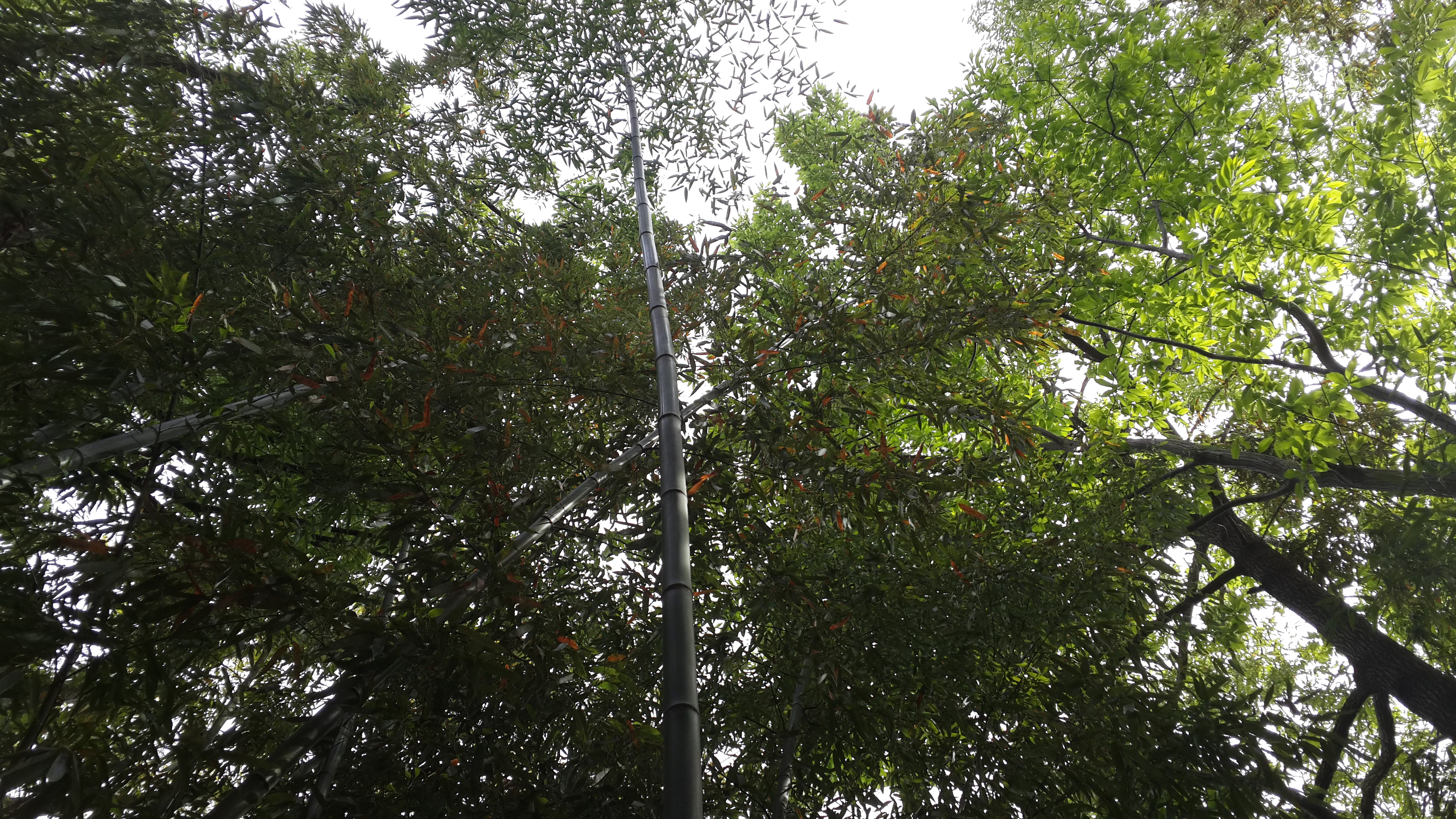
Damyang's bamboo forest has gained national fame.

=== Bamboo ===
Damyang is one of the northernmost places where bamboo can be found on the Korean peninsula, and its bamboo forests are well known among Koreans. Many touristic attractions have been created to leverage that reputation: a Bamboo Theme Park / Daenamugol, a Bamboo Museum, a Bamboo Festival, a park filled with green bamboo (Jungnogwon).

=== Metasequoia ===
A stretch of metasequoia trees just outside Damyang-eup, planted during the Park Chung Hee administration in the 1970s, has a long walking path of about two kilometers. The trees are particularly striking in late October to early November when their leaves turn bright colors. The walk gained nationwide popularity after a romantic drama was shot here. It was even picked as one of the most beautiful roads in all of Korea.

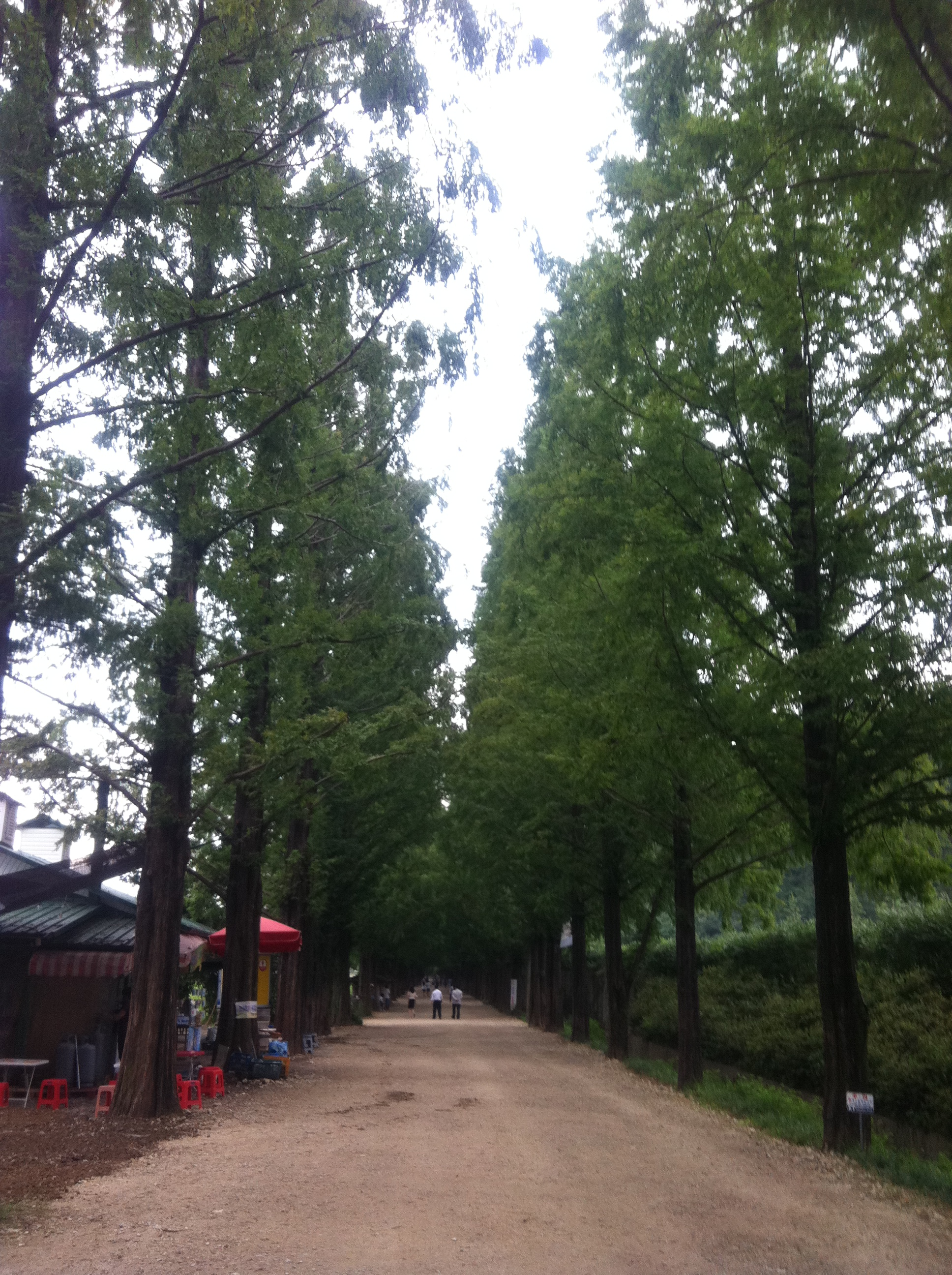
Metasequoia trees in summer

== Culture ==
=== Food ===
- Jeollanam-do enjoys a good reputation for its cuisine, and Damyang provides a large choice of restaurants.
- The most popular specialities include Damyang ddeok galbi (tteokgalbi): this tasty and juicy marinated beef and pork mix, usually grilled at the table, is supposed to have originated either in Damyang or in Gwangju.
- Bamboo foods served at restaurants in Damyang include daetongbap (rice cooked in bamboo), tea places bamboo tea and the salad of raw bamboo with spicy vinegar.

=== Literature ===
Several houses of famous scholars can be visited, and the Miam Diaries (Miam Yu Hui-chun: 1513–1577) are preserved in Daeduk-myon.

=== Events ===
- Damyang Bamboo Festival
- The V Asian-Pacific Astronomy Olympiad took place in Damyang in October 2009.

=== Dramas ===
Korean dramas have become a significant source of revenue for tourism, and many counties sponsor series or compete to host a few shootings, hoping to hit a jackpot similar to the localities 'blessed' with Winter Sonata's visit. Damyang boasts its metasequoia path (see above), and a 'movie village'.

== Landmarks and Monuments ==
They include the fortress of Geumseongsanseong, and various national treasures (pagodas, pavilions... - overall, 66 properties, including 15 at the national level and 51 at the provincial level).

Infrastructure has followed the natural assets, and tourists can stay in themed resorts with local features such as hot baths perfumed with bamboo.

=== Temples ===
- Yongheungsa in Wolsa-myeon (not to be confused with Busan's Yonggungsa)
- Gaeseonsa in Nam-myeon.

=== Soswaewon ===
A private garden built by Yang San-bo (1503–1557), Soswaewon (소쇄원) stretches along a streamlet dotted with pavilions where visitors may meditate.

=== Juknokwon ===
Juknokwon (죽녹원) was opened in May 2003. This bamboo grove is 310,000^{2} wide. There are 8 trails which have different themes. And it was filming location of 'R-Point'.

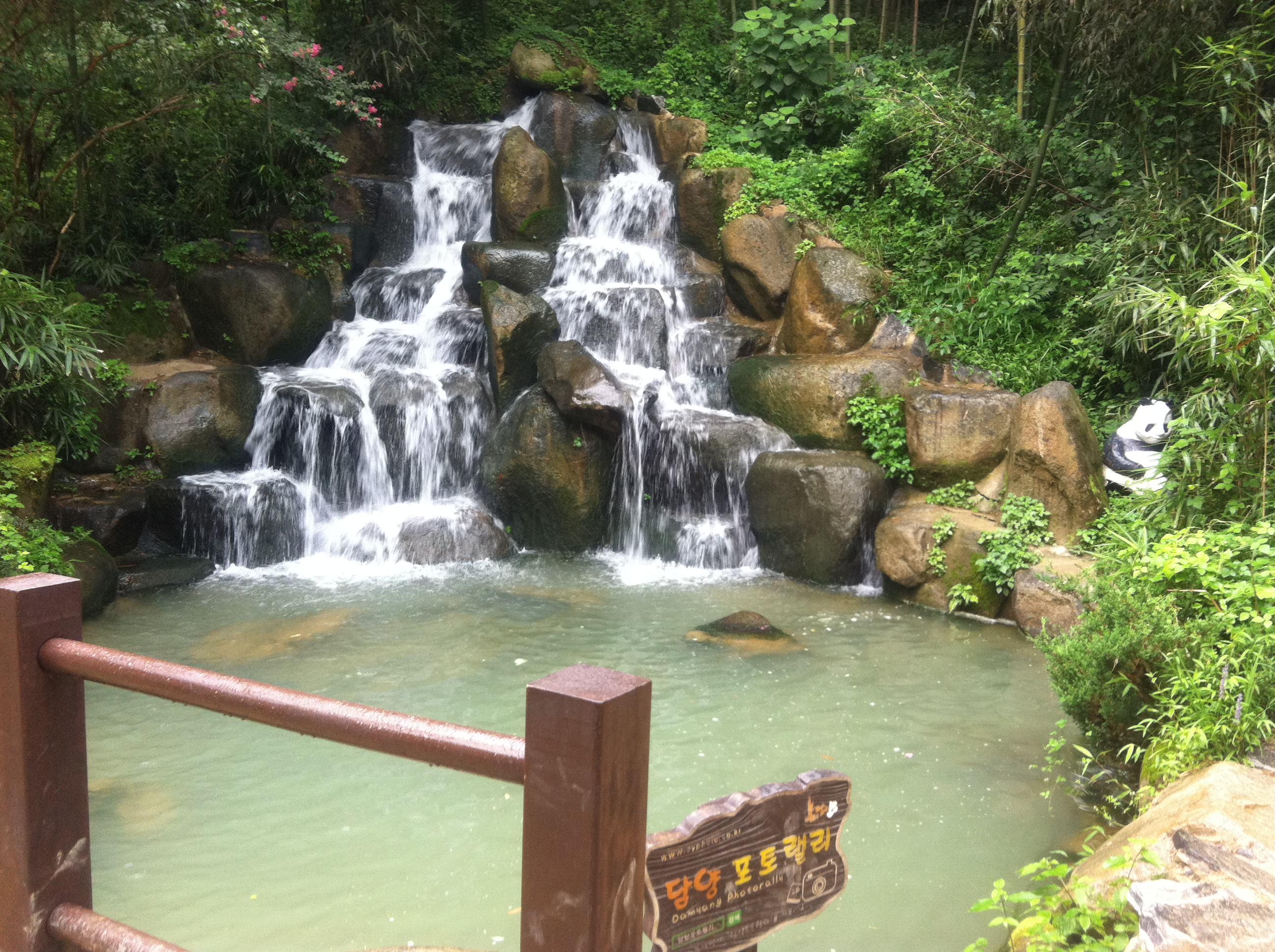
Juknokwon (bamboo forest) has 8 different themes.

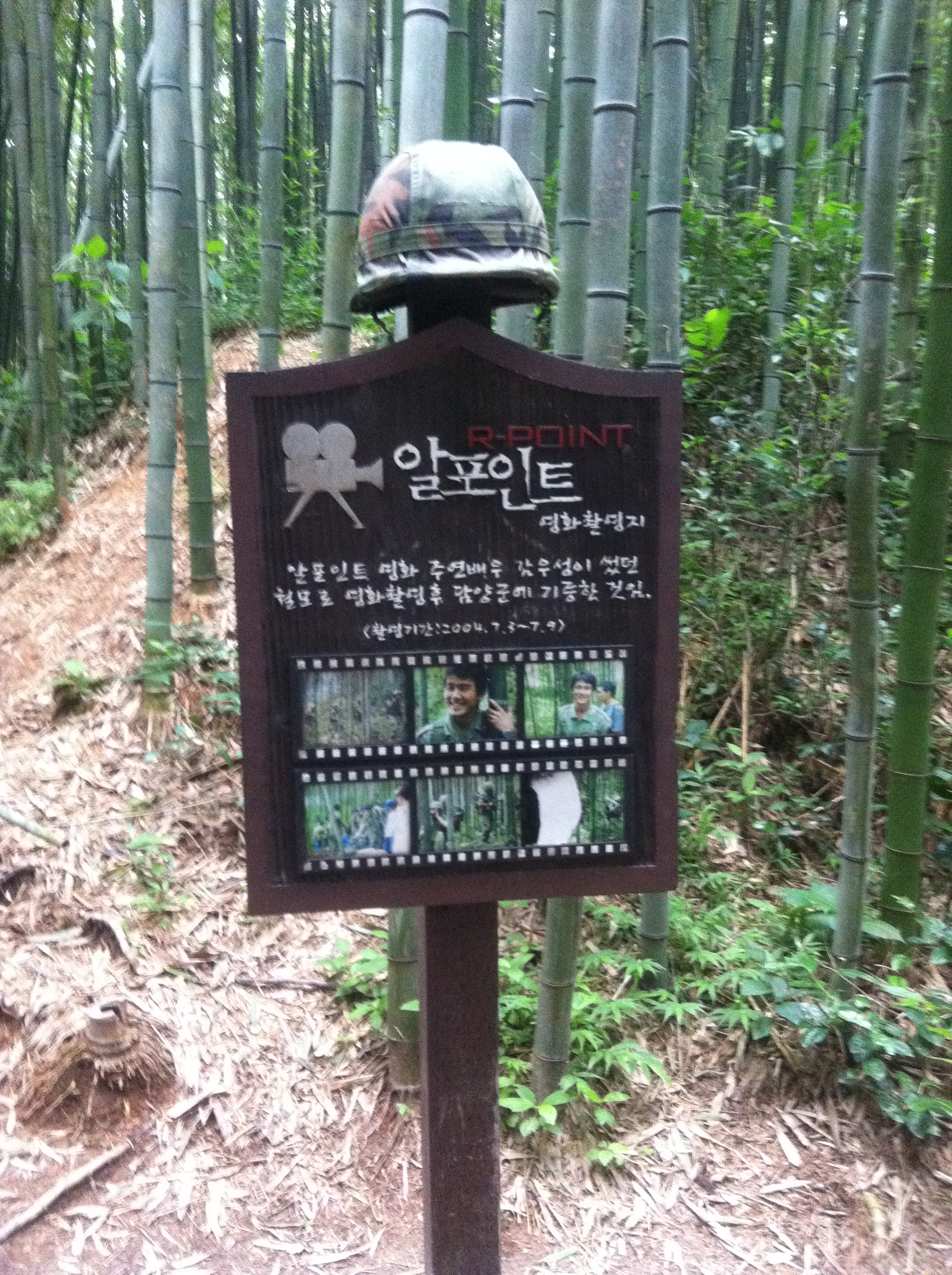
Filming location of 'R-point' in Juknokwon

=== Gwanbangjerim ===
Gwanbangjerim is a forest created to protect Gwanbangje, an embankment along Damyangcheon Stream. It is designated as Natural Monument No. 366, and about 320 deciduous broadleaf trees of 15 species remain.

== Sister cities ==
- Anji, China
- Takehara, Japan
- Lynnwood, Washington, United States

== See also ==
- Administrative divisions of South Korea
- Geography of South Korea
