= Mudeungsan =

Mountain in South Korea

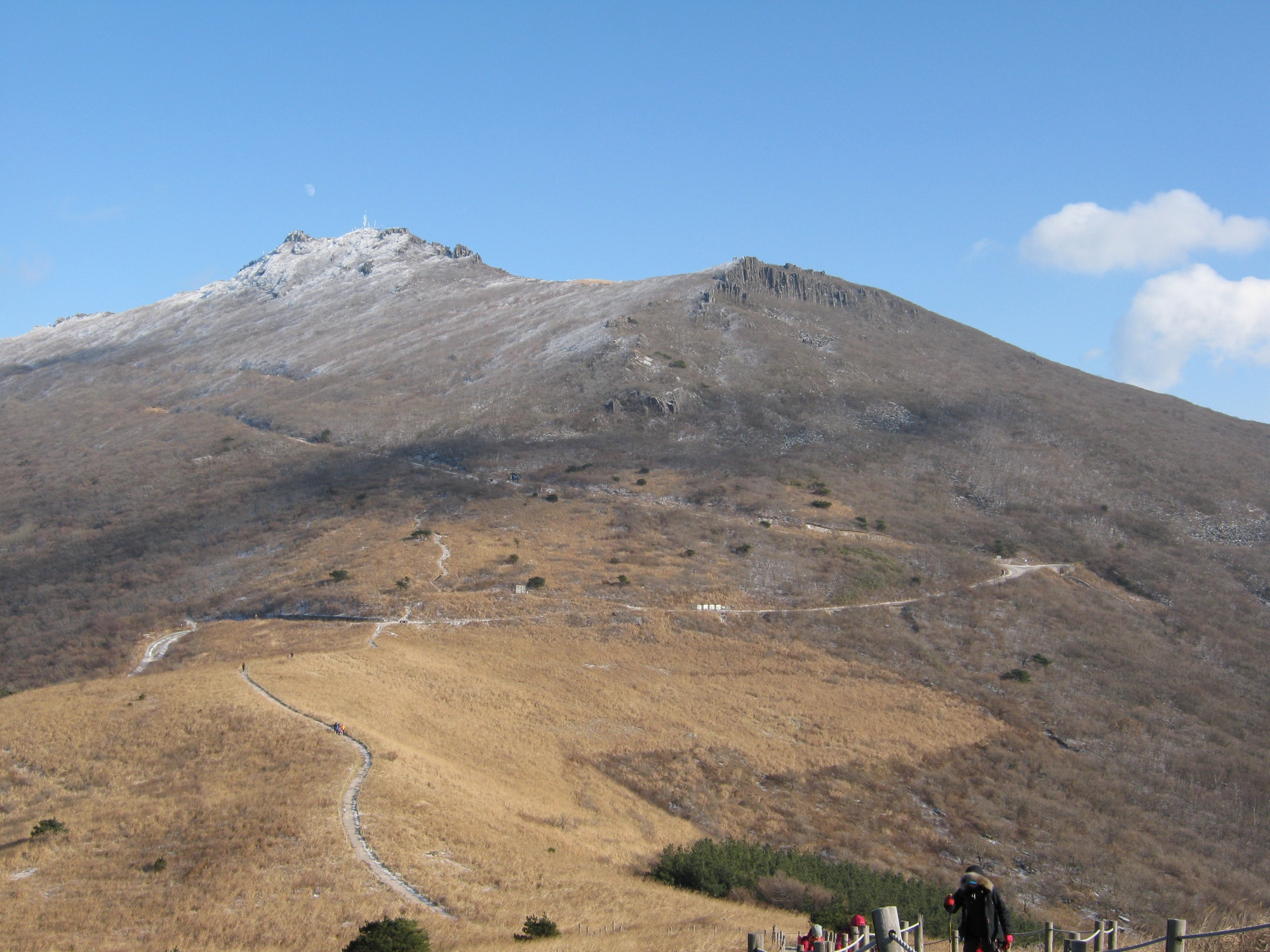

Highest point
- Elevation: 1,187 m (3,894 ft)
- Prominence: 1,011 m (3,317 ft)
- Listing: Ribu
- Coordinates: 35°08′21″N 126°59′33″E

Geography
- Location: South Korea

Korean name
- Hangul: 무등산
- Hanja: 無等山
- RR: Mudeungsan
- MR: Mudŭngsan

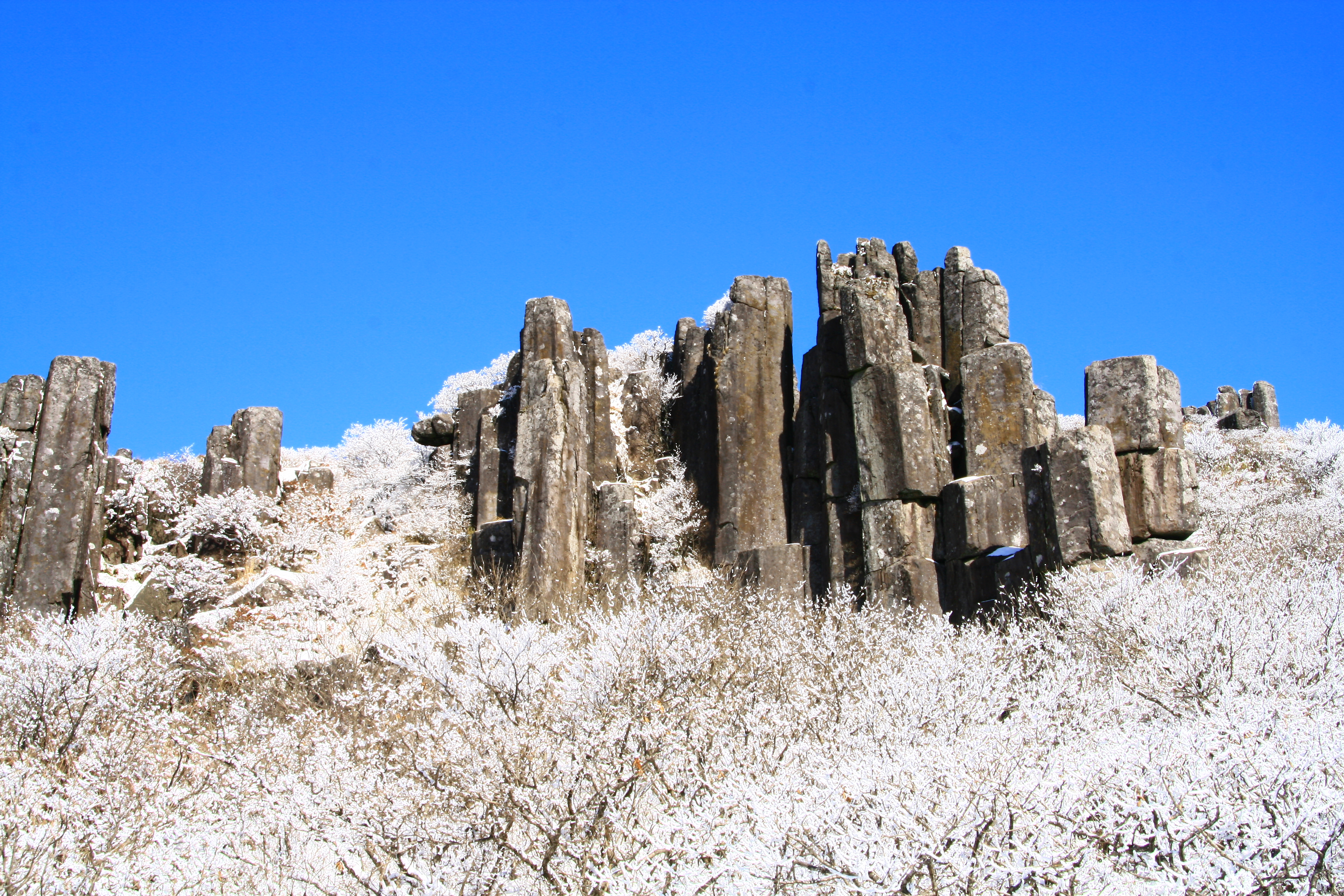
Columnar joints

Mudeungsan (Korean: 무등산) is a mountain in South Korea. It extends over Buk District, Gwangju, as well as Hwasun County and Damyang County in South Jeolla Province. Mudeungsan has an elevation of 1,187 m (3,894 ft) and is a part of Mudeungsan National Park which gained national park status in 2012. The peak of Mudeungsan is named Cheonwang summit, but it has been designated as a protection zone for air force military installations. Therefore the highest spot the climbers can ascend without special permission is Seoseokdae Rock, with an elevation of 1,100 m (3,600 ft).

Looking from the summit, Hallasan in Jeju Island and Geojedo in Namhae, South Gyeongsang Province can be seen.

== Name ==
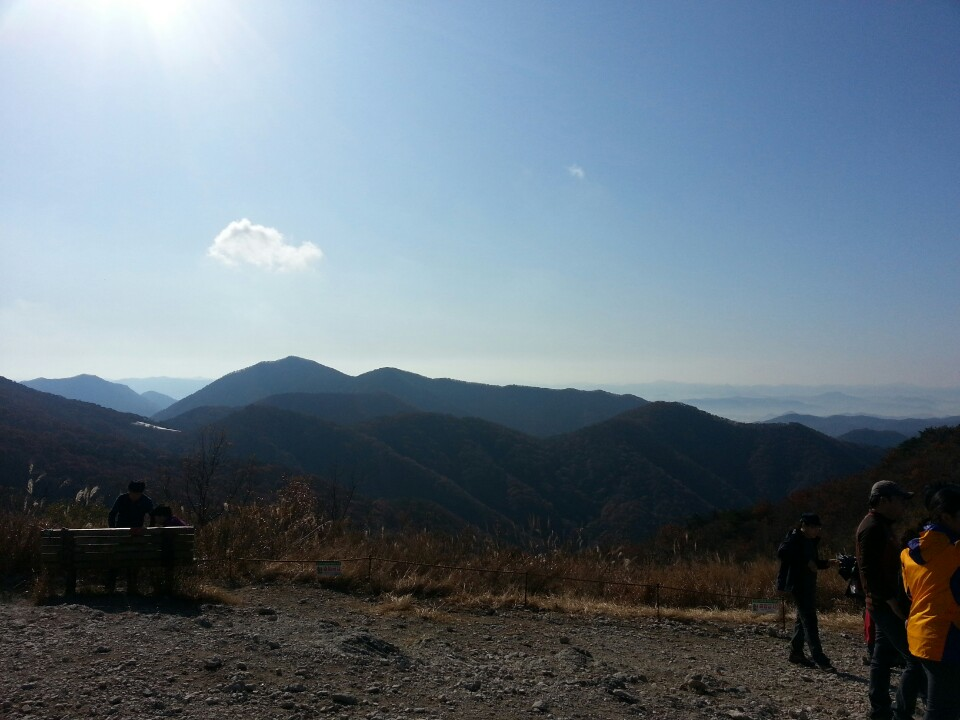
Jungmeorijae of Mudeungsan

The mountain was known as Muak or Mujinak due to its location Mujinju, the former name of Gwangju. As most of the big mountain ranges are related to shamanism, it was also called "the Grave Mountain" or "the Shaman Mountain". The Mudeungsan range is primarily composed of soil rather than rocks. It was called Seoseok mountain during the Goryeo dynasty. It was after the introduction to Buddhism in Korea that it was called Mudeungsan. One explanation for this is that the people believed that the greatness of the mountain could not be compared to anything on the land, and thus it could not ("mu") be graded ("deung"). However, this is supposedly an interpretation adapted from the Hanja transliteration of its original Korean name, which comes from Gwangju's original name, Moodeul or Moodol. The jin in Mujin as written in Hanja was not pronounced so in the past. It used to be read as deul or dol in Korean. Therefore Mudeung can be interpreted in the same way.

== History ==
On 22 May 1972, Mudeungsan was designated as a provincial park. On 29 April 1974, the government notified a basic park plan (the 61st notification of South Jeolla Province). On 1 September 1987, the government installed the Mudeungsan Park Administrative Office. On 24 September 1998, the government established a comprehensive plan about conservation and use of Mudeungsan. On 7 December 2001, the government changed the basic park plan. On 24 December 2010, Gwangju filed a petition to the minister of environment to designate Mudeungsan as a national park. On 31 December 2012, Mudeungsan was designated as a national park. On 4 March 2013, the government installed Mudeungsan national park office and east office. On 3 December 2015, the government notified withdrawal of military bases.

== Provincial and national park ==
Mudeungsan was designated as a provincial park in 1972. It is located at Gwangju, Hwasun County and Damyang County. It has a total area of 30.23 km^{2} (11.67 sq mi) In 2012, it was designated as a national park, expanded to a total area of 75.425 km^{2} (29.122 sq mi). However, Gwangju Lake area and some cultural areas were excluded from national park, due to the opposition from local government and residents.

== Natural monument ==
Columnar joining in the mountain is protected as natural monument No. 465.

There are many valuable animals such as otters, wildcats, buzzards and Mandarin ducks, designated as endangered at Mudeungsan. In addition, there are many cultural heritages.

== Summits ==
In 2011, after 45 years of being restricted by the military, Inwang summit and Jiwang summit were opened to the public. However, Cheongwang summit remained closed due to air defense facilities. Only those identified and approved by the military after learning about security-related subjects from Jangbuljae can go there. It was opened twice in 2011; quarterly in 2012 and 2013; once in 2014; and three times in 2015.

== Environment ==
The Sobaek Mountains are the main range of Mudeungsan. Mudeungsan has a gradual descent toward the ground. Average temperature for the year is 13.2 °C (55.8 °F) which is 5 °C (9 °F) below that of downtown of Gwangju. Average rainfall for the year is about 1,500 mm (59 in), which is more than 200 mm (7.9 in) above what is received in downtown Gwangju. The sky is clear 53 days per year.

== Tourist attractions ==
- Soswaewon Garden
- Songgangjeong Pavilion
- Myeonangjeong Pavilion
- Sigyeongjeong Pavilion
- Hwanbyeokdang Pavilion
- Riverside Eco Park
- Unjusa
- Ssangbongsa
- Gokseong Train Village
- Boseong Green Tea Farm
- Chuwolsan
- Damyang Bamboo Garden
- Hwasun Hot Springs
- Dogok Hot Springs

== See also ==
- List of mountains in Korea
- National parks of South Korea
- Jeungsimsa
- Wonhyosa
