= Hwanbyeokdang =

South Korean historical site

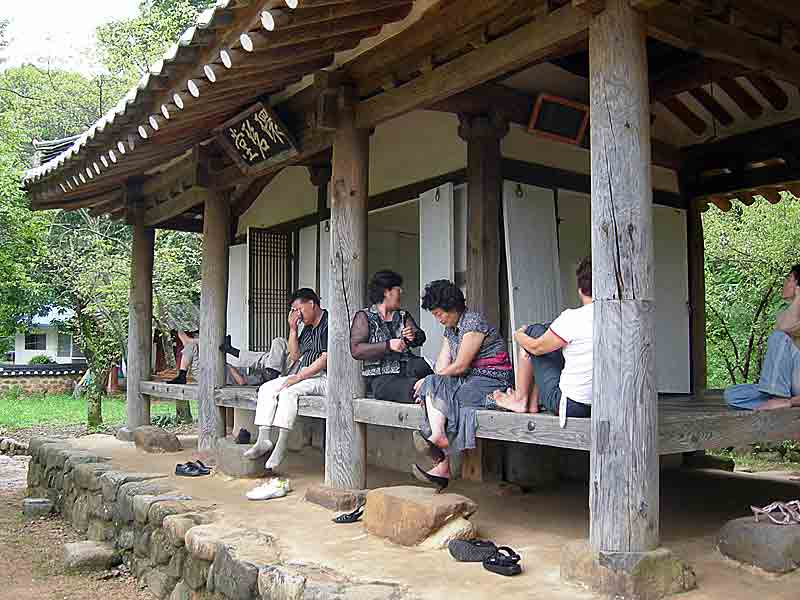

Korean name
- Hangul: 환벽당
- Hanja: 環碧堂
- RR: Hwanbyeokdang
- MR: Hwanbyŏktang

Hwanbyeokdang or Hwanbyeokdang Pavilion is a garden pavilion, located in the neighborhood of Chunghyo-dong, Buk-gu of Gwangju, near Damyang County, South Jeolla Province, South Korea. It was built by Sachon (also known as Kim Yunje, 1501–1572) on the hill behind his house. Hwanbyeokdang was named 'Hwanbyeokdang' by Sinjam, and a rough translation is 'a place surrounded by green trees and water.' It was also previously called "Byeokgandang" (벽간당).

== An anecdote ==
The pavilion is known as a historical site related to Chŏng Ch'ŏl and has an anecdote regarding him. When Kim Yunje took a nap in the pavilion, he dreamed that a dragon flew into the sky from a fishing spot. After awakening, he felt odd, so ran to the place and found a boy swimming there. Kim was so fascinated with the boy and his remarkable appearance, that arranged for his granddaughter to marry the boy. The boy was Chŏng Ch'ŏl who later became a politician and famous literary figure.

== Structures ==
The pavilion was constructed on a stone embankment on the hillside facing south. It has rooms on the south, north and west sides and has a wooden verandah on both the east and west sides. When originally built it was in the traditional style of a pavilion but was modified by Sachon's descendants. When first built it was surrounded by bamboo but these have now gone and in place of the bamboo there are myrtle, zelkova, phoenix, cherry and Chinese quince trees.

Sachon spent his later years, after the 1545 purge of scholars called Eulsa sahwa (을사사화), here training young scholars. Both Chŏng Ch'ŏl and Sŏhadang Kim Sŏngwŏn studied here. Inside the pavilion there are on display poems by Song Si-yŏl and Im Ŏngnyŏng.

== See also ==
- Soswaewon
- Hanok
- Seowon
- Korean architecture
- Korean garden
