= Mudeungsan National Park =

Park in Gwangju, South Korea

- 무등산국립공원
- IUCN category II (national park)
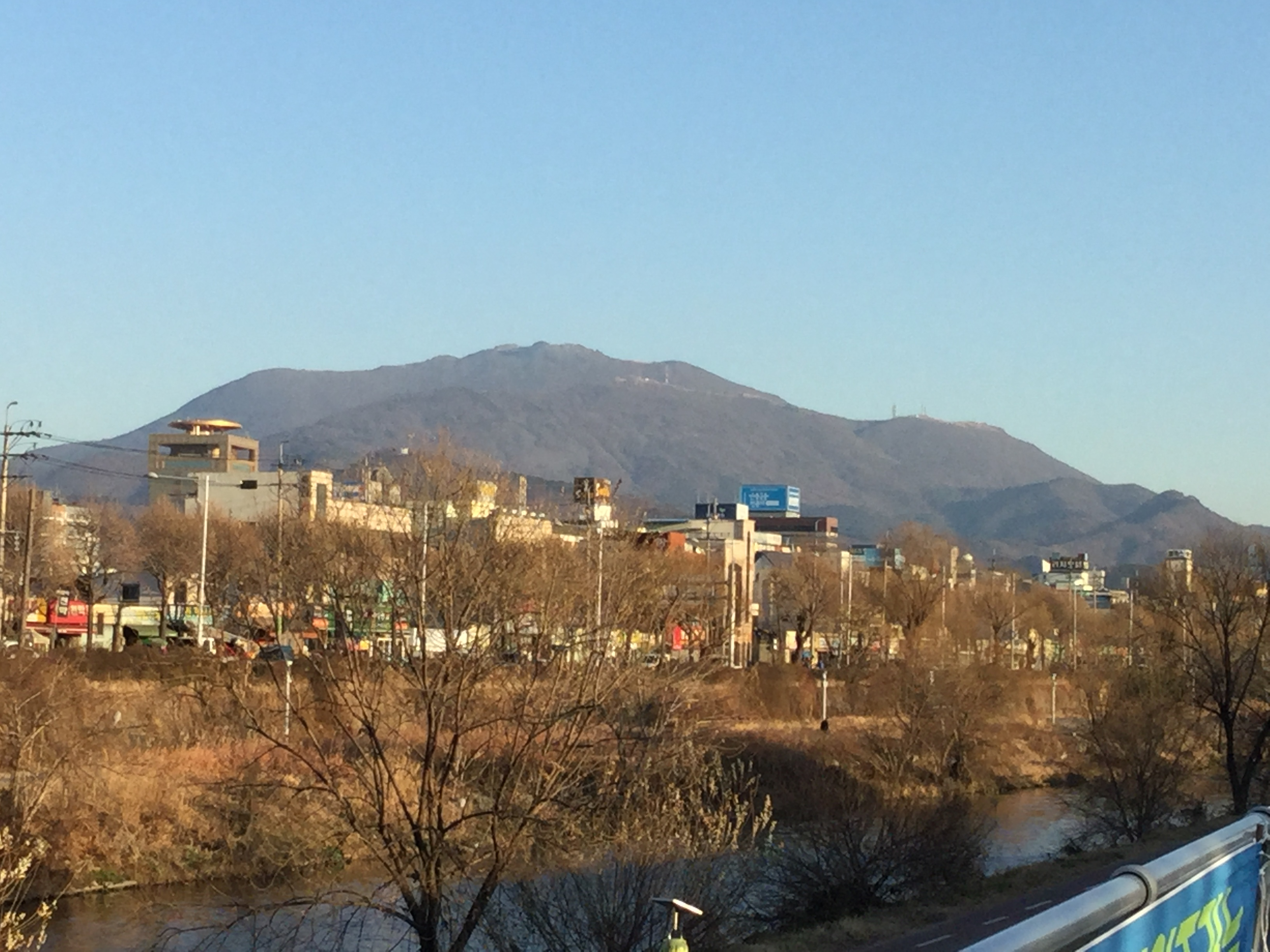
- Interactive map of Mudeungsan National Park
- Location: South Korea
- Nearest city: Gwangju
- Coordinates: 35°08′38″N 126°59′20″E
- Area: 75.45 km^{2} (29 sq mi)
- Established: 2012
- Governing body: Korea National Park Service

Korean name
- Hangul: 무등산국립공원
- Hanja: 無等山國立公園
- RR: Mudeungsan gungnip gongwon
- MR: Mudŭngsan kungnip kongwŏn

Mudeungsan National Park (Korean: 무등산국립공원), previously Mudeungsan Provincial Park, is located in Jeonnam-Gwangju, South Korea. The park was designated a provincial park on 22 May 1972 and was upgraded to national park status in 2012, making it South Korea's 21st national park. The park has an area of 75.45 km^{2} (18,600 acres) and is named after the 1,187 m tall Mudeungsan.

The twenty-two national parks of South Korea.
Land-based parks are in red and marine parks are in blue.

== See also ==
- List of national parks of South Korea
