= Soswaewon =

Garden

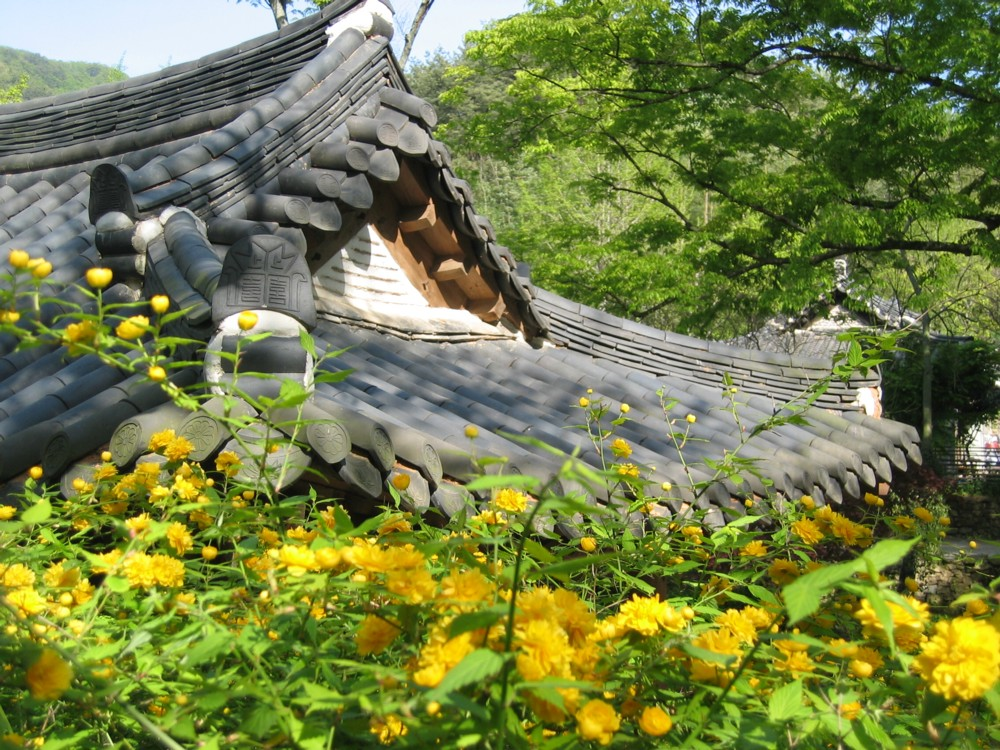

Korean name
- Hangul: 소쇄원
- Hanja: 瀟灑園
- RR: Soswaewon
- MR: Soswaewŏn

Soswaewon or Sosaewon is a typical Korean garden of the middle Joseon Dynasty. It is located in the Nam-myeon, Damyang County of the South Jeolla Province, South Korea.

This garden harmonizes with nature in characteristic traditional Korean style. Clean waters in the valley flow below the wall and fall through the small cataract into the lake. This place can be said to be a cultivating house of scholar spirit in that many Confucian scholars discussed academic subjects and wrote their works here.

== History ==
Soswaewon was originally constructed by Yang Sanbo (양산보) from the end of 1520 through the middle of 1530. Yang gave up his government position after his teacher, Cho Kwangjo (1482–1519) was exiled and then killed in the purge of 1519 called Kimyo sahwa (기묘사화). So Yang made this garden to seclude himself from social position. The part of the garden was burnt down during the Japanese invasions of Korea (1592–1598), but the buildings were reconstructed by his descendants, and the present Soswaewon was renovated by Yang Taek-ji, Yang Sanbo's descendant in the fifth generation. An 18th-century map of Soswaewon remains. It is carved on wood in the 31st year of King Yeongjo (1755), and shows the original design of the garden.

== Structures ==
- Jewol Pavilion

Jewol Pavilion is a house for the host and means "bright moon after raining".

- Gwangpung Pavilion

Gwangpung Pavilion is a house for guests and means "bright sun and fresh wind after raining".

- Daebong Pavilion

Daebong Pavilion is located at high hill of Soswaewon. It means the luck of phoenix is regarded as the good news.

== Gallery ==
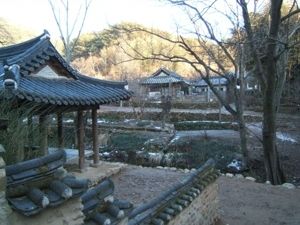

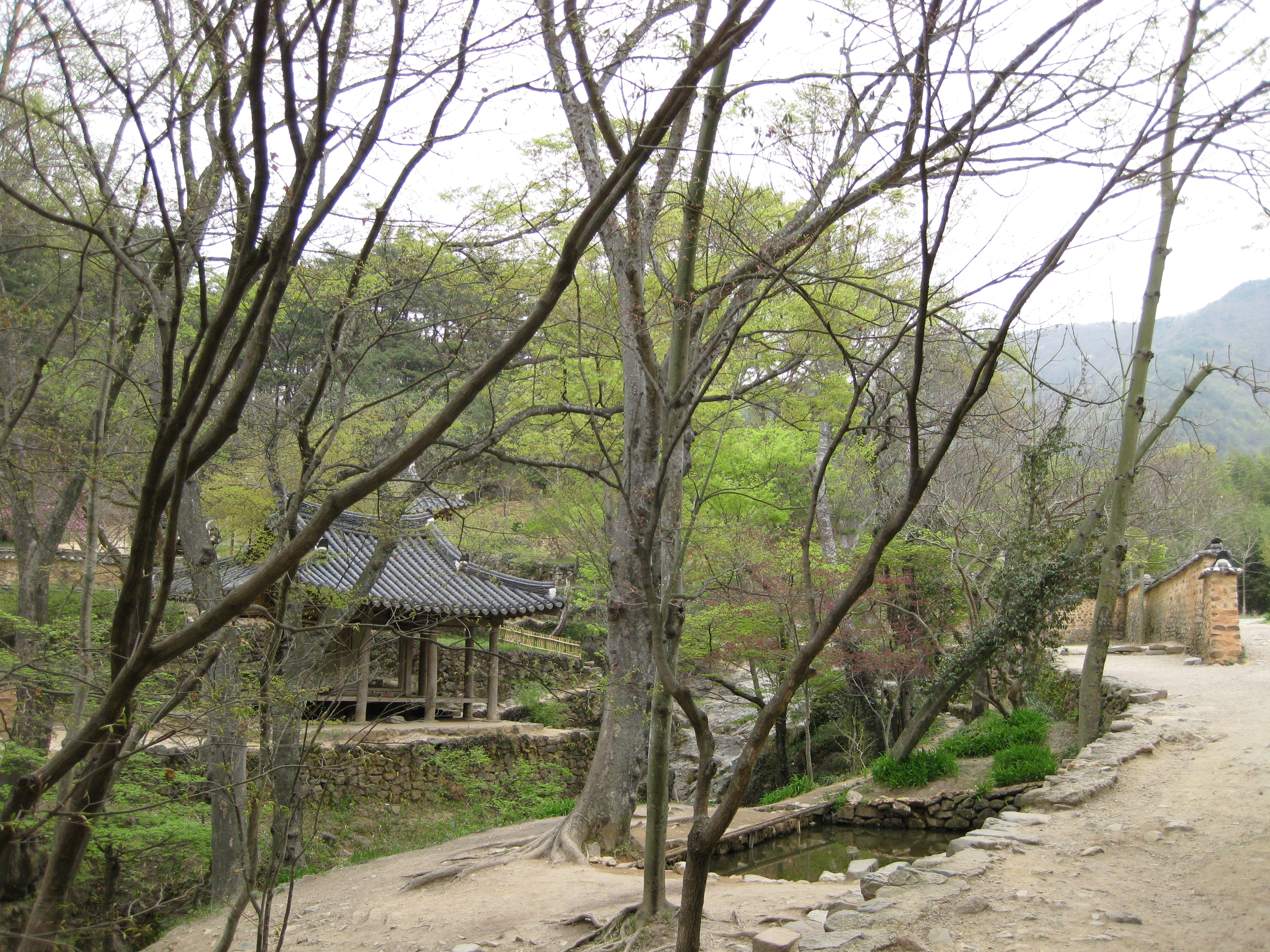

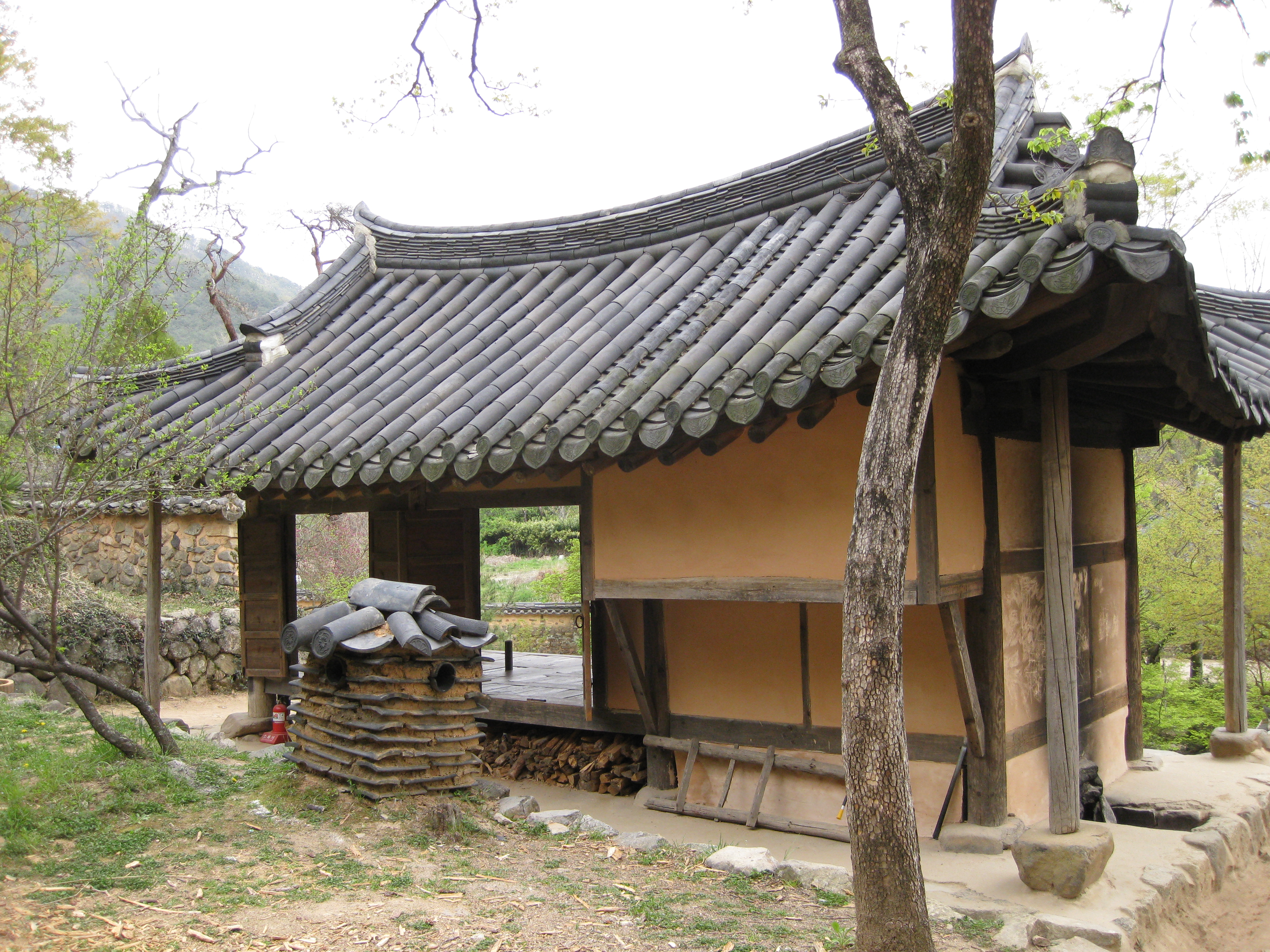

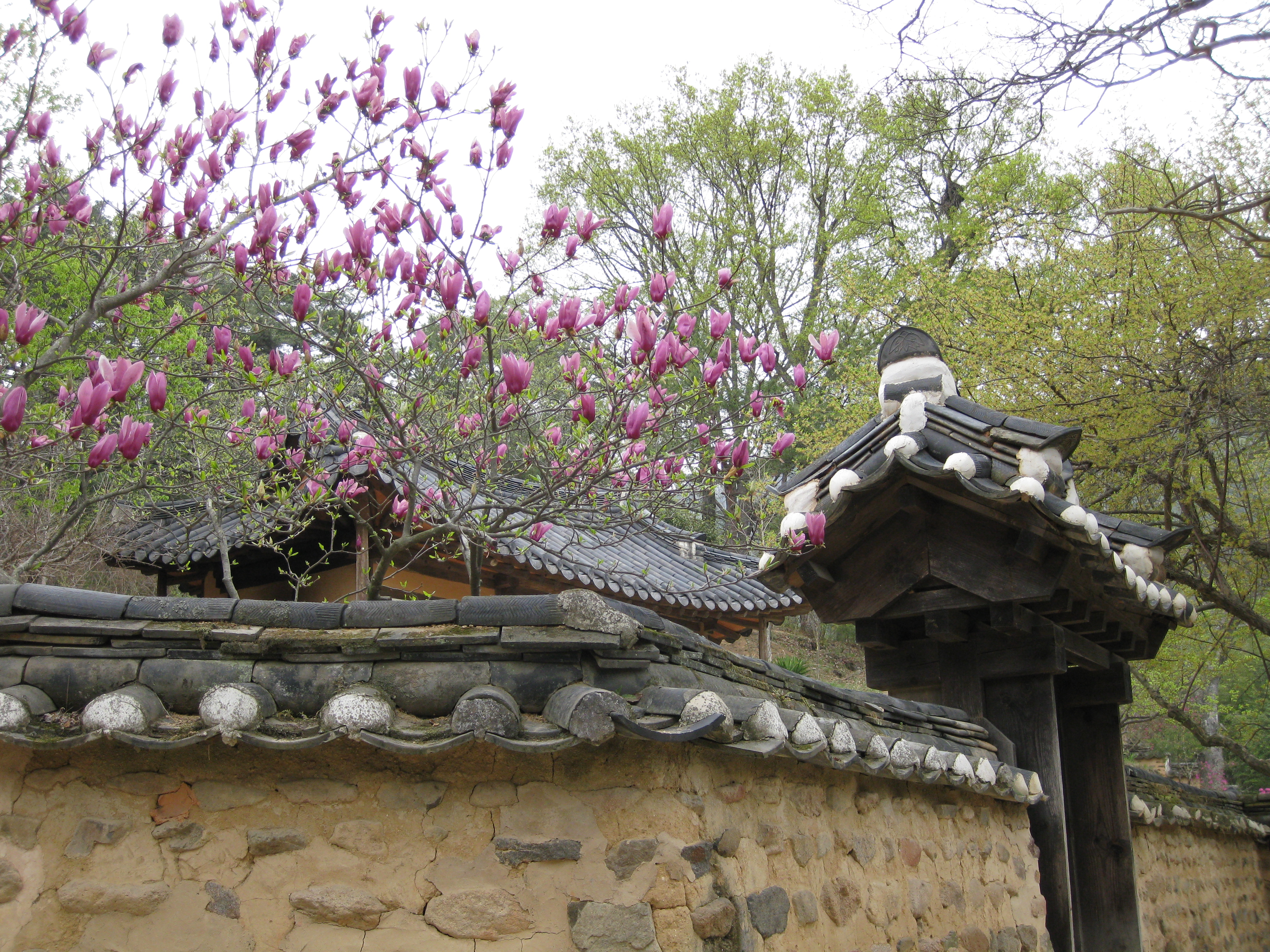

== See also ==
- Hwanbyeokdang
- Korean garden
- Hanok
- Seowon
- Korean architecture
