= Unjusa =

Buddhist temple in South Korea

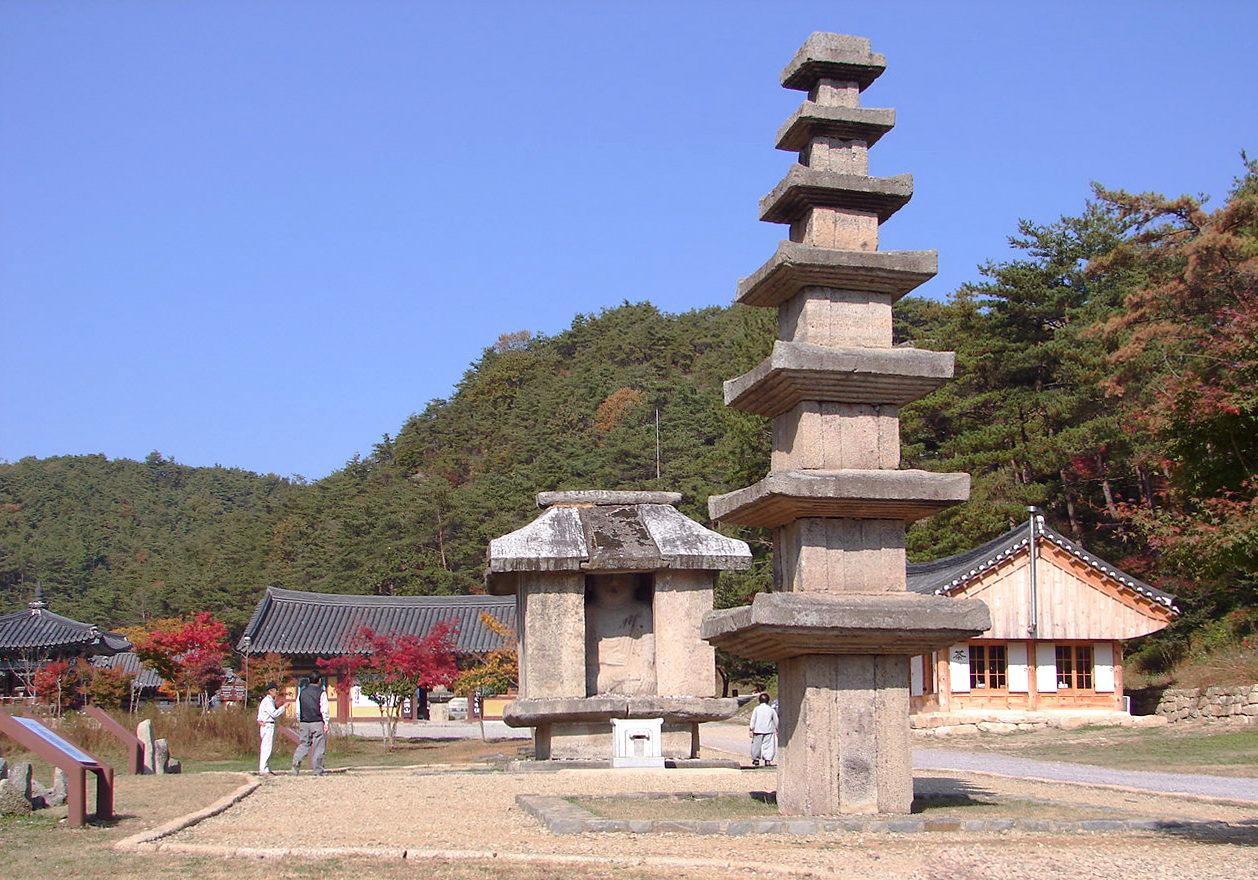

- Location within South Korea

Religion
- Affiliation: Buddhism

Location
- State: South Jeolla
- Country: South Korea
- Coordinates: 34°56′N 126°53′E

Korean name
- Hangul: 운주사
- Hanja: 雲住寺 or 運舟寺
- RR: Unjusa
- MR: Unjusa

Unjusa or Unju Temple is a Korean Buddhist temple located in Hwasun County, South Jeolla province, South Korea. It is 26 km (16 mi) southwest of Hwasun County or 40 km (24 mi) south of Gwangju. Compared with other temples in South Korea, this temple has an unusual collection of stone Buddha statues and stone pagodas, so Unjusa is often referred to as the mysterious temple. Among several assumptions regarding its origin, the most widely known one is that Monk Doseon founded the temple based on geomancy during the late period of Silla Dynasty (57 BC – 935 AD), but the origins remain unverified.

Unjusa is designated as Treasure #312 and is the site of the well known Treasure #796, Unjusa Gucheung Seaktap (Nine-story Stone Pagoda at Unjusa).

== Origin ==
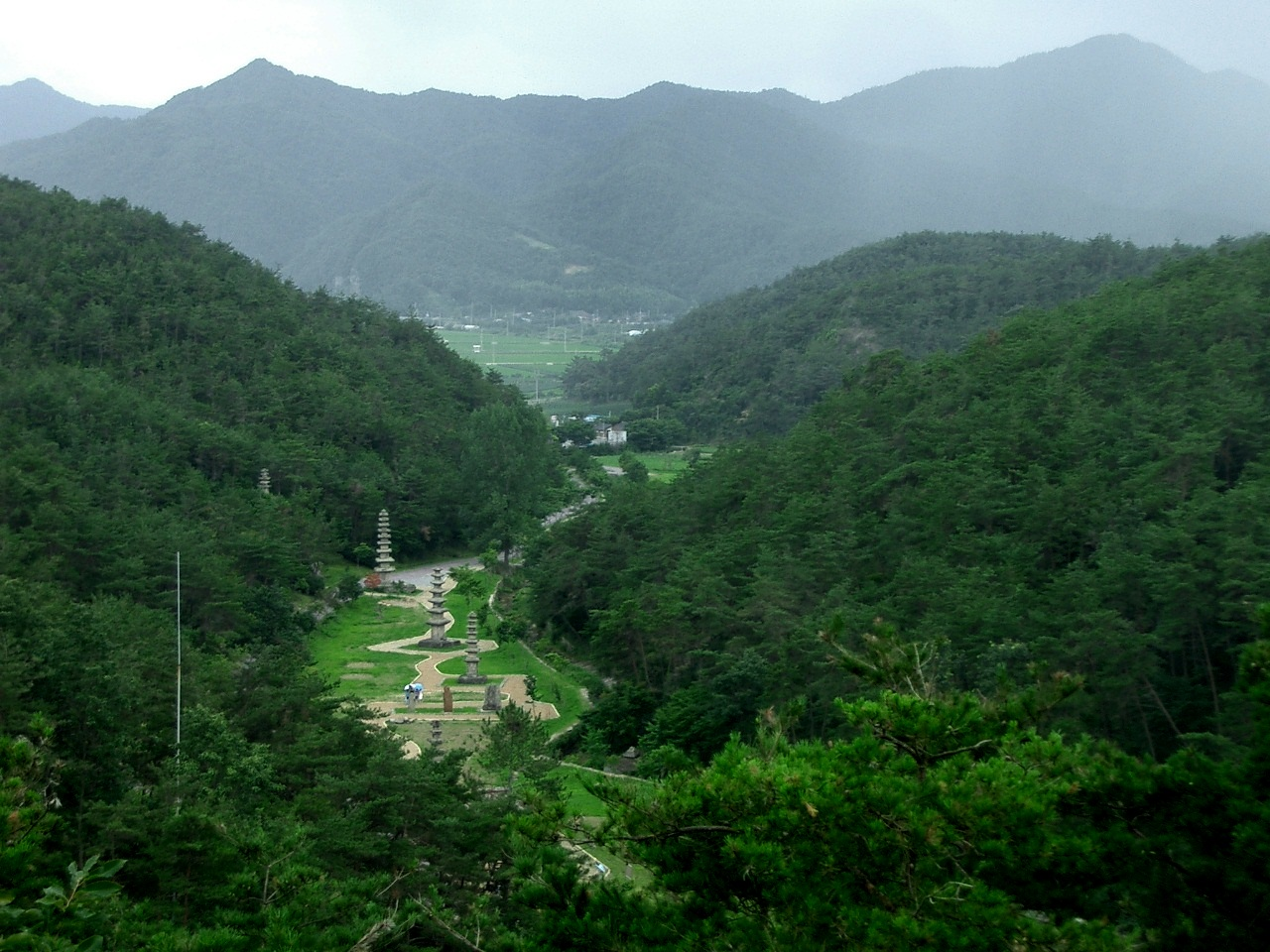
View from above Unjusa

Four excavations and two academic studies occurred at the temple, conducted by Jeonnam National University Museum from 1984 to 1991, but the exact time the temple was built, by whom, and construction methods remains a mystery.

Legend has it that according to the traditional theory of Korean geomancy, the peninsula was thought to be unbalanced and in danger of capsizing because there were fewer mountains in Honam, the southwestern part of the peninsula, than in Yeongnam, in the southeastern part. To prevent this disaster, one night Monk Doseon (도선국사) called stone masons down from heaven to build a thousand Buddha statues and pagodas at Unjusa, in the southwestern part of the peninsula. However, before the last Buddha statues could be completed, the cock crowed recalling the stonemasons back to heaven just before the crack of dawn, leaving two statues lying unfinished on the ground. These two unfinished statues became known as "Wabul" (와불) or The Stone Statues of the Lying Buddha.

A more practical explanation is that Unjusa was created as a school for stonemasons.

== Pagodas and statues ==
Unjusa is known for being as the only Korean Buddhist temple to ever have had over a thousand stone Buddha statues and stone pagodas(Cheonbul Cheontap, 천불천탑), as documented in the 1432 text Donggukyeojiseungram (동국여지승람). All the statues are thought to have remained intact until at least the early Joseon Dynasty (1392–1910).

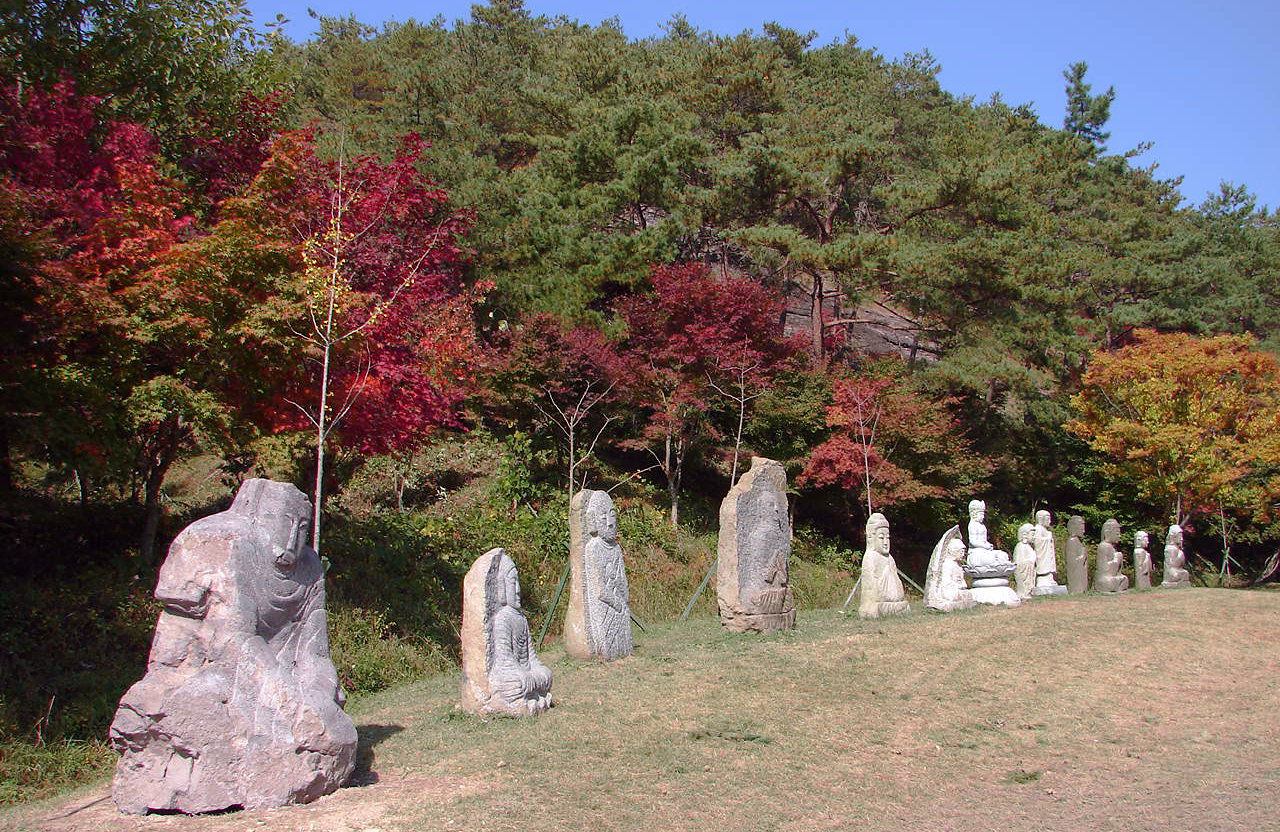

Presently only 91 stone Buddha statues and 21 stone pagodas still remain. The 21 stone pagodas that are scattered in the surrounding fields and mountains vary in shape and are 3,5,7 and 9 stories in height. The square pagodas are narrow and tall with flat roof stones, typical features of pagodas from the Goryeo period (918-1392). It is of special note that geometrical patterns like X and III are carved on the surfaces of the pagodas. These are the most common techniques frequently observed among the remaining pagodas of Unjusa, along with the geometric wrinkle patterns of the stone Buddha statue's garments.

The remaining Buddha statues scattered throughout the fields around, and on the grounds of, Unjusa vary in size from dozens of centimeters/inches to more than 10m/33 ft high. The statues all have similar features unique to Unjusa having pillar-like bodies, simple faces, arms and hands that are out of proportion with the rest of the figures, wearing clumsy drapes of plain Buddhist robes - features that are similar to localized features of stone Buddha statues of the Goryeo period.

Unjusa enshrines many special stone statues of Buddha presenting good examples of religious symbols, supporting the belief that the existence of these stone Buddhas and stone pagodas will greatly enhance the research of Buddhist art history in Korea.

== Temple Gallery ==
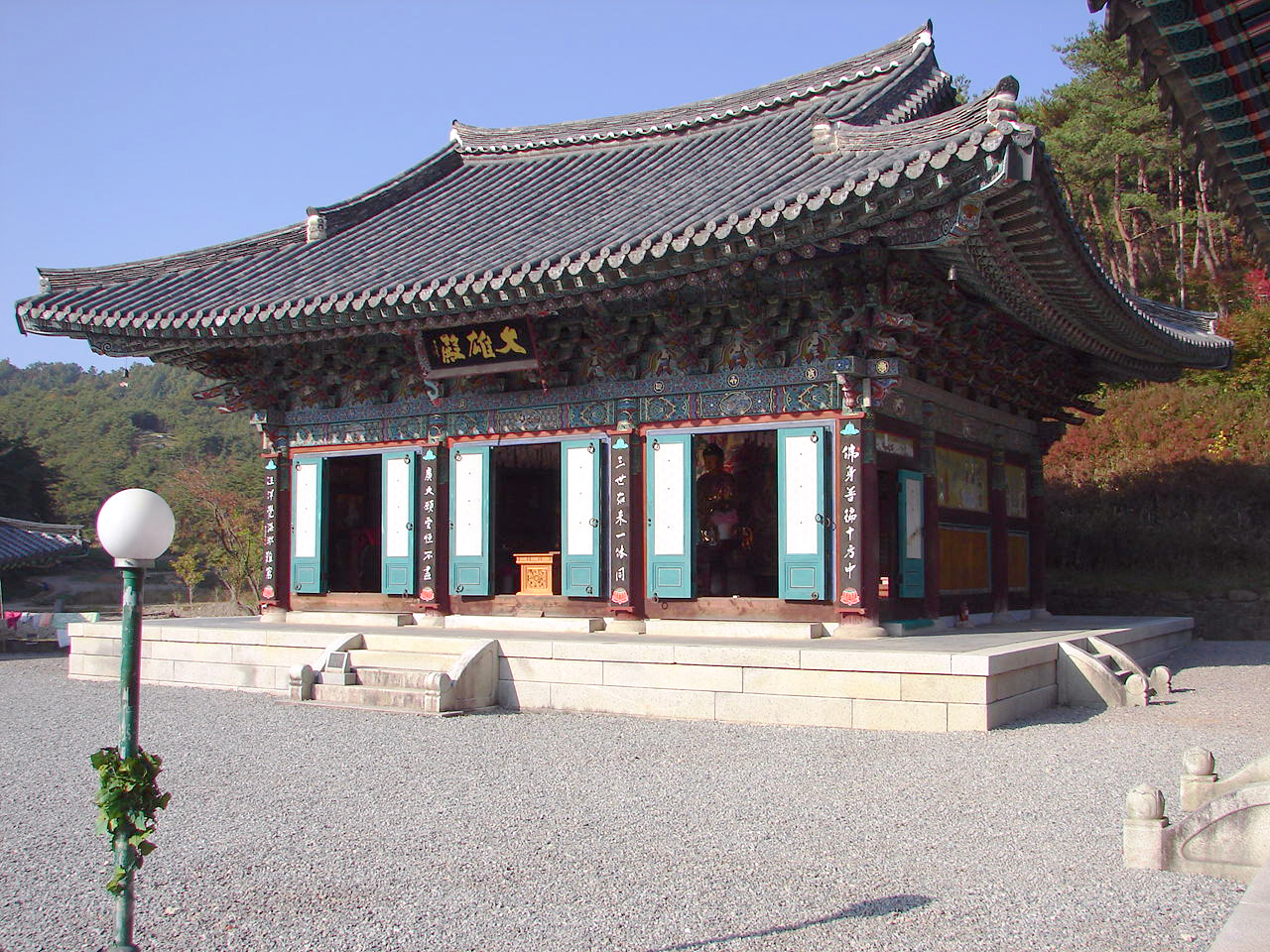
Unjusa main worship hall

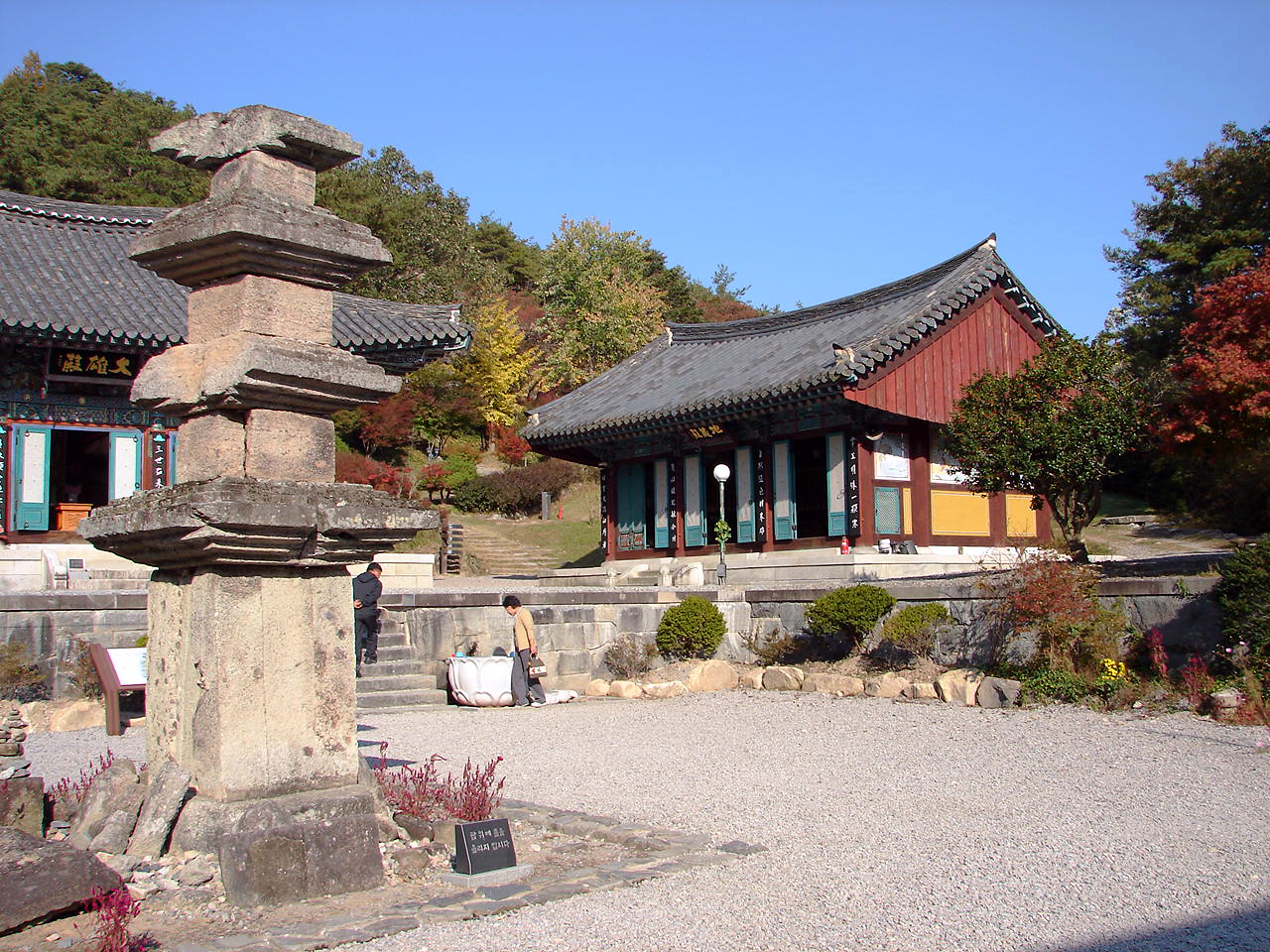
Unjusa Dacheung Seoktap (stone pagoda) and worship hall

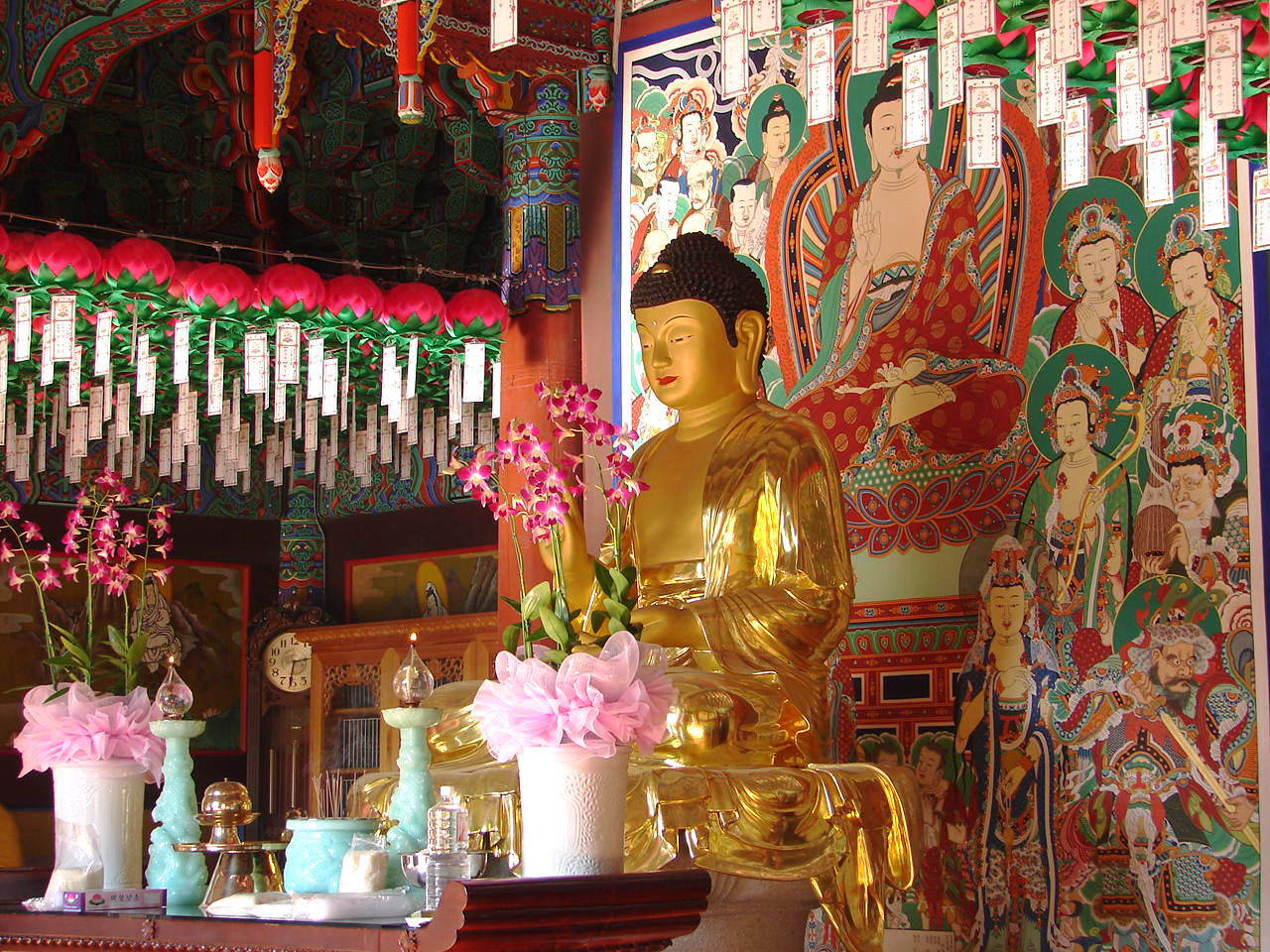
Unjusa main worship hall Buddha

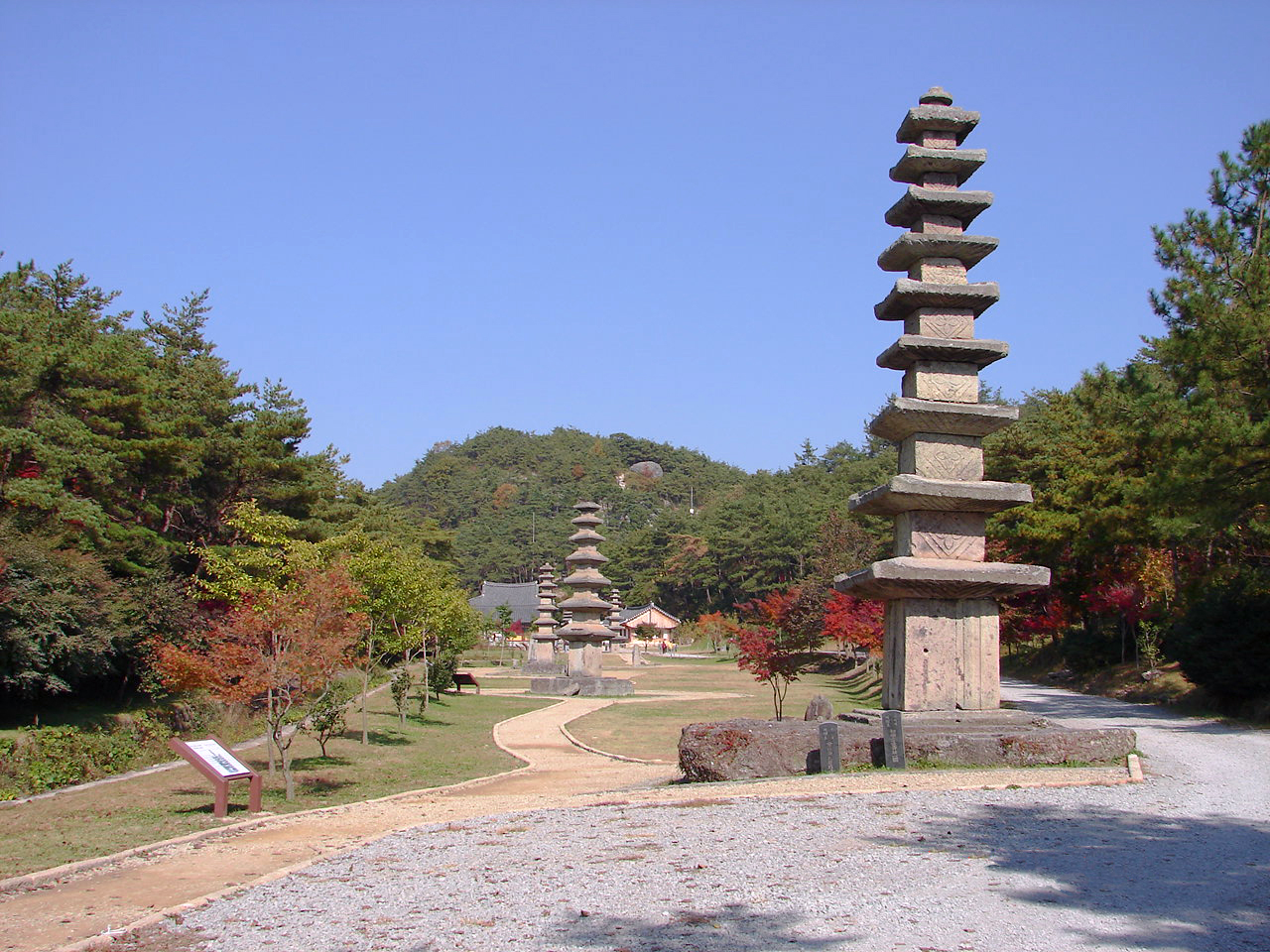
Pagodas lined up on the grounds of Unjusa

== Treasures and Tangible Cultural Properties ==
Monk Doseon found the topology of the valley to be suggestive of a great ship so he thought his temple needed a sail and shipmaster. The square, tall pagodas, erected along a straight line down the center of the valley represent the masts of the ship's sail, where the rounded pagodas and Buddhas found throughout the grounds represent the crew.

=== Unjusa Gucheung Seoktap (Nine-storied Stone Pagoda at Unjusa) ===
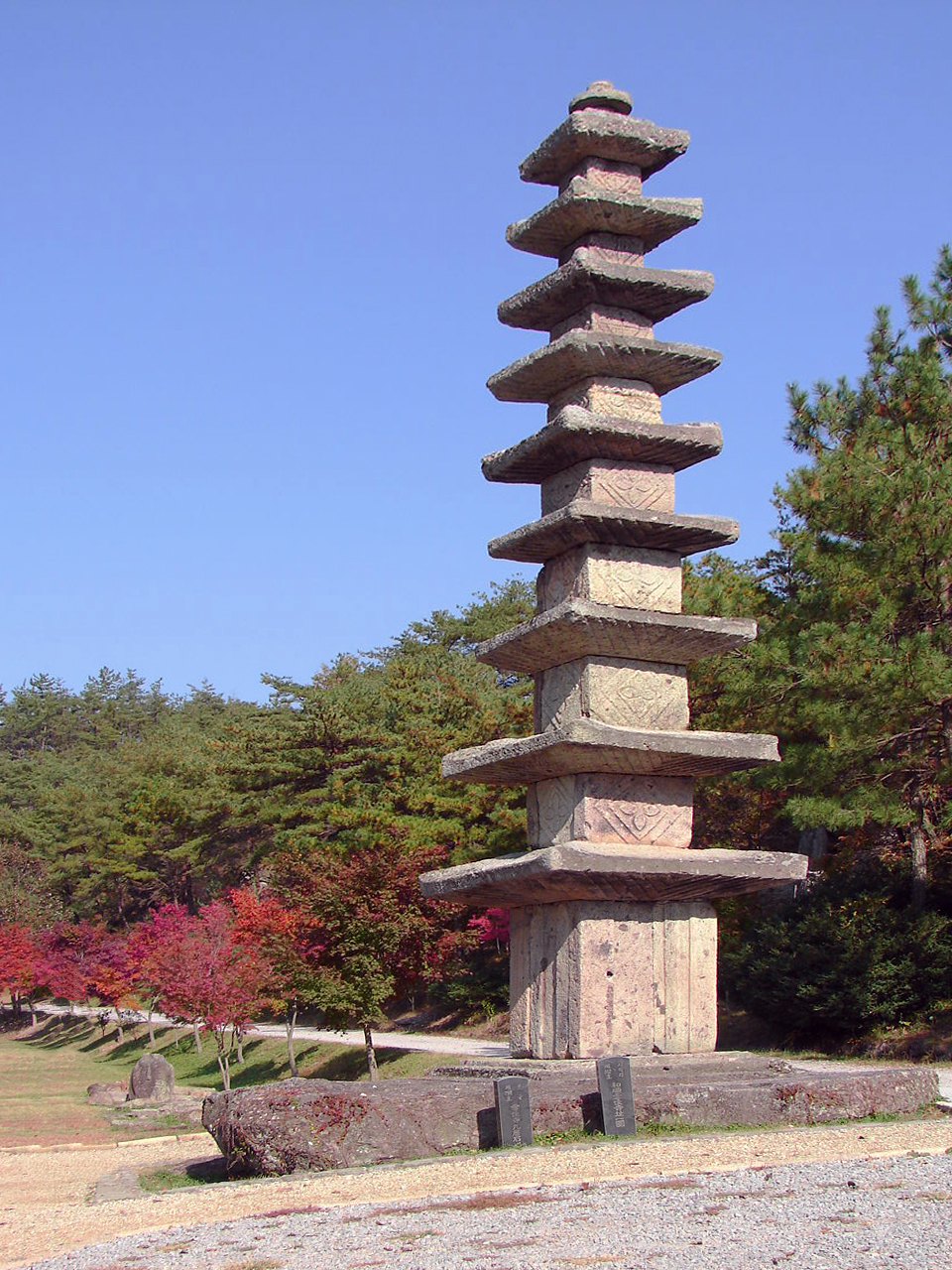
Unjusa Gucheung Seoktap

This tall stone pagoda, the tallest on the grounds, is designated Treasure number 796, and is the first of the stone pagodas encountered while approaching the worship halls via the main thoroughfare. The base stone is resting on a large rock, and the pagoda is engraved with a full complement of geometric patterns. The second and third stories are constructed of four separate wall stones where the other stories are all solid, decorated with pillars on the edge and centers. The body stones have double engravings of diamond shapes with floral patterns within the diamond. With the roof stone corners jauntily lifted up and a comb-pattern along the eaves, this pagoda represents grandeur of the finish detail typical of the latter period of the Goryeo Dynasty. The finial atop the pagoda, a cylindrical stone, preserves a place for Buddha. This stone pagoda is considered one of the finest pagodas at Unjusa. This is Treasure #796.

=== Unjusa Seokjo Bulgam (Stone Buddhist Shrine at Unjusa) ===
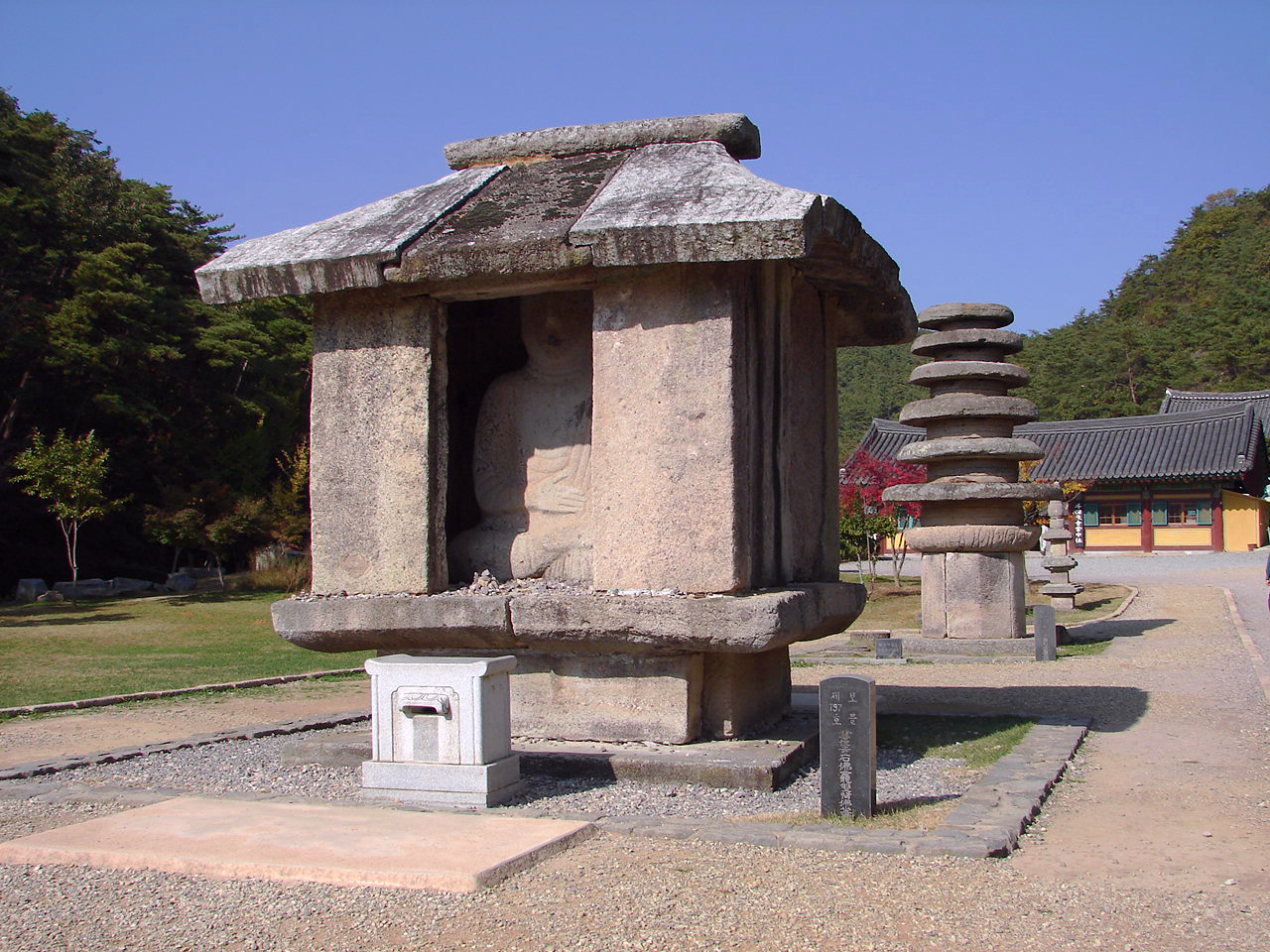
Stone Buddhist Shrine at Unjusa-south facing Buddha

Among the various stone pagodas and statues of Buddha that are spread over the Unju Temple grounds, the Bulgam (stone Buddhist shrine) can be found in the center of the valley. This Bulgam was constructed in the style of a wooden house having a hip roof with a ridge cap on top. Within the openings to the north and south, twin Buddha statues are positioned seated back-to-back. The Buddha facing south is seated cross legged. The Buddha facing north is carved in the same manner with the hands hidden under the robe that are believed to be in a mudra, or gesture, symbolizing that the Buddha and multitude are one, which is an identifying feature of Vairocana or Buddha of Light. Because of the unique positioning of the two images, this shrine is highly valuable to the study of Buddhist sculpture. The Buddha statues present a rather stiffened expression in a plain and simple manner, known to be a local trait developed during the Goryeo Dynasty. The twin stone Buddha statues found seated back-to-back inside this shrine presents a unique sight. This is Treasure #797.

=== Wonhyeong Dacheung Seoktap (Multi-Storied Cylindrical Pagoda at Unjusa) ===
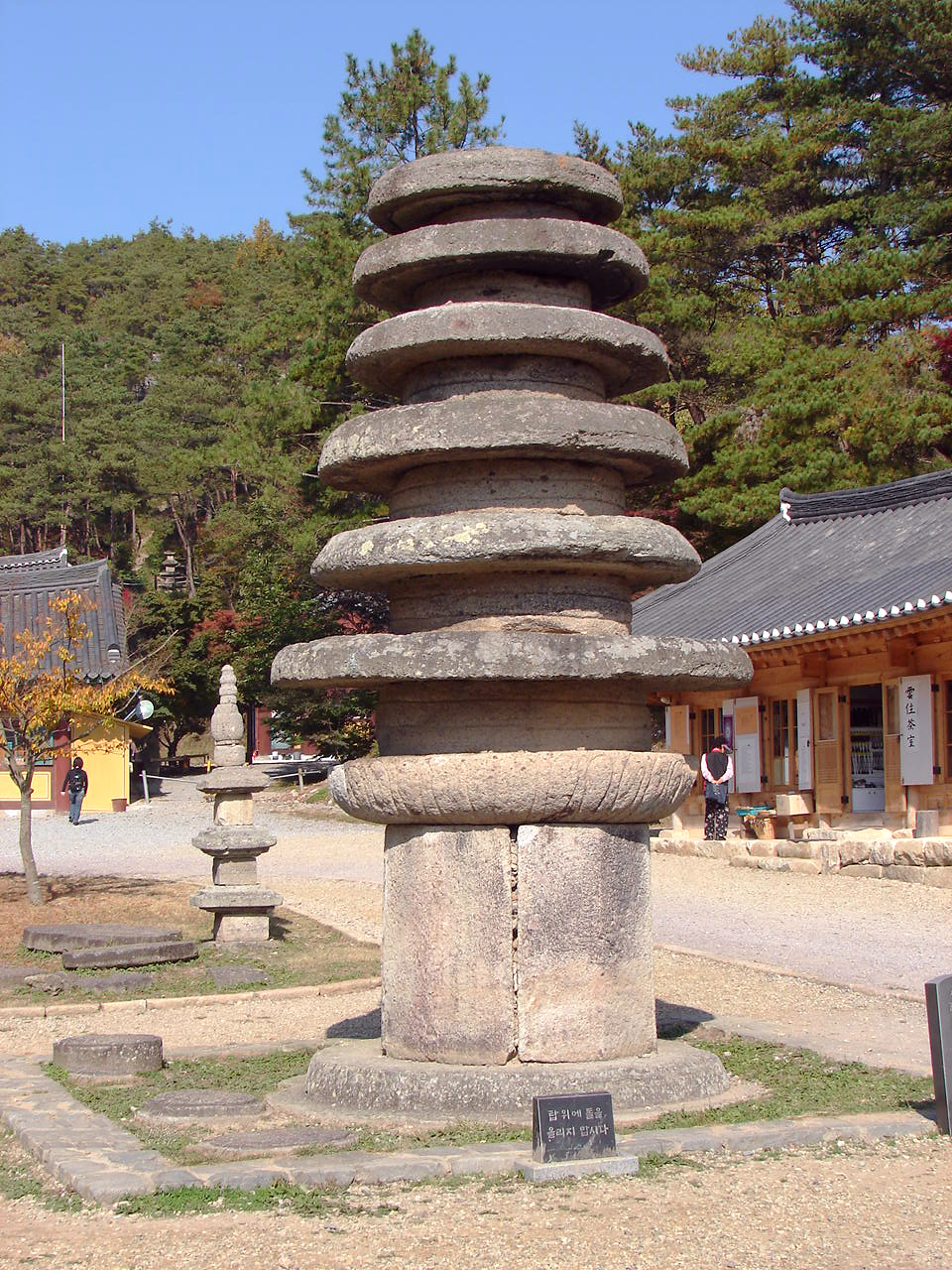
Wonhyeong Dacheung Seoktap

This stone pagoda was constructed on a circular shaped foundation stone. Two solid stones with five facets each, forming a decagon (polygon with ten sides), make up the base of the pagoda sitting on the round foundation stone. The body and roof are made of single pieces of stone. With the exception of the base stone, all of the body and roof stones of this multi-layered pagoda are cylindrical. Every one of the main body stones have a double horizontal line carved all the way around the circumference of the stone. The first story stone above the base stones is decorated with 16 petals and a lotus flower. This stone pagoda presents unique features reflecting the characteristics of the pagodas during the Goryeo Dynasty. This is Treasure #798.

=== Geobuk Bawi Ohcheung Seoktap (Five-storied stone pagoda on a turtle-shaped rock base) ===
This pagoda is situated on a large rock base called "Geobuk Bawi" or turtle shaped rock. Different from the other seven-storied pagodas at Unjusa, this pagoda follows the patterns of the Silla era pagodas. However, the roof stone of the pagoda has no prop supports like other Unjusa pagodas. On the upper part of the pagoda, stone material is placed connecting the main support column. In general, it follows an elegant style of masonry with the overall proportions typical of the Silla era pagoda. The height of this pagoda is 5.57m/18.3 ft and was erected during the Goryeo Dynasty. This is Tangible Cultural Property #256.

=== Stone Statue of the Lying Buddha ===
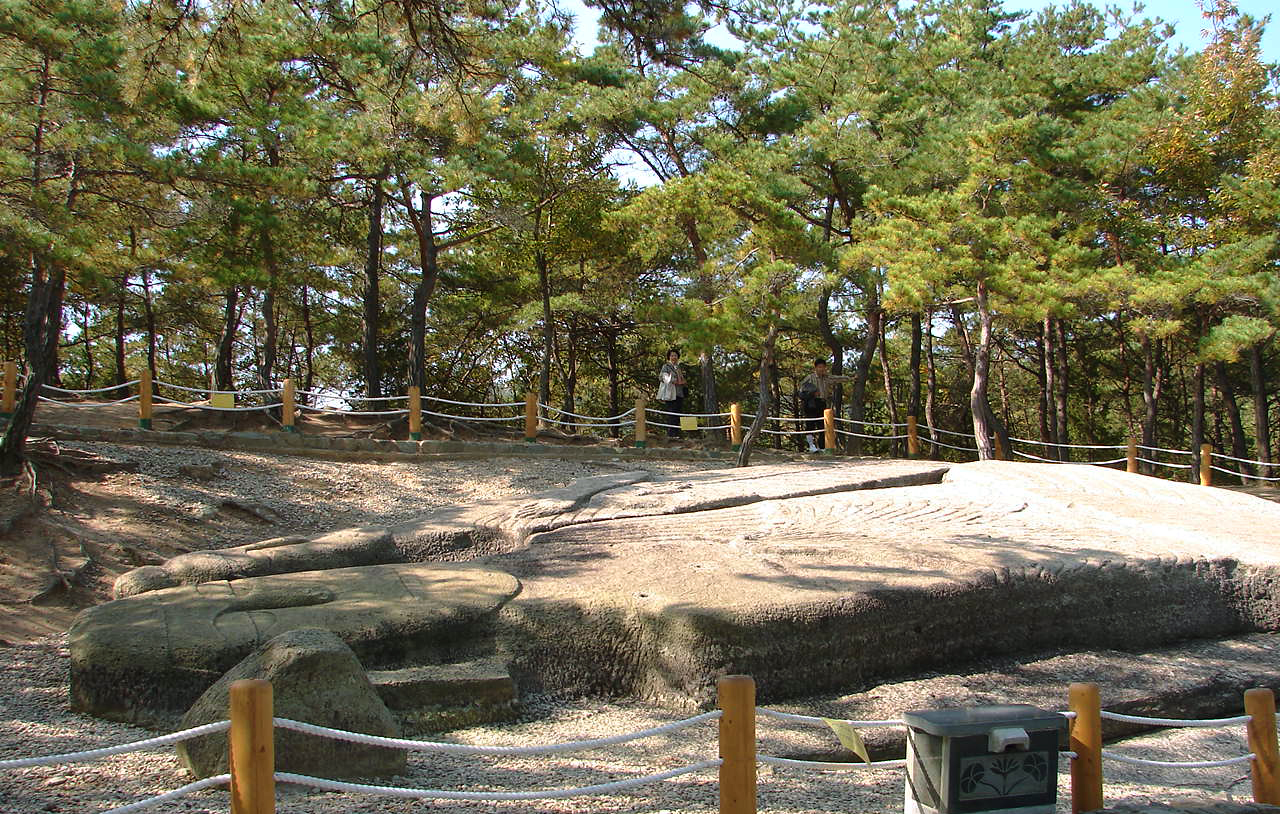
Stone Statue of the Buddha Lying Down

The two "Wabul", or the Lying Stone Statues of Buddha, are located on the western side of the top of the mountain heading southward. The larger Buddha on the left side has less body balance due to the narrow shoulder width compared to that of the knees. The sign of the fingers (Mudras - symbolic or ritual hand gestures) of the smaller Buddha may express the offering contentment in living to people as the Goddess of Mercy. However, the gesture is rather clumsy due to the lack of reality. The lines of dress are simply expressed by vertical and diagonal lines. A legend says that after erecting 1,000 stone statues of Buddha and pagodas in one night, Doseon Guksa (a monk in the late Silla period) was about to erect these last two statues of Buddha when he had to suspend the construction because of the first crow of the rooster at dawn, sending the stonemasons back to heaven. As the legend goes, these two Buddhas impart the most significance. The lengths of these two Buddhas are 12.73m/41.8 ft and 10.3m/33.8 ft respectively. This is Tangible Cultural Property #273.

=== Unjusa Kwangbae Seokbul-jwasang (Seated Stone Statue of Buddha with Nimbus at Unjusa) ===
This statue is the only stone Buddha with a nimbus at Unjusa. The nimbus with a flame pattern was carved using a depressed engraving method on a trapezoid stone backing. The entire Buddha is carved from one solid piece of stone. The Buddha, Buddha's mudras (symbolic or ritual hand gestures), nose, eyebrows and ears are carved in relief while the nimbus is carved in depression. This is Tangible Cultural Property #274.

=== Unjusa Chilcheung Seoktap (Seven-Storied Stone Pagoda at Unjusa) ===
This pagoda was located originally on land used for farming so the monks of Unjusa purchased all the encompassing farmland and converted it to lawn surrounding the temple grounds. A round stone base supports the upper levers of this pagoda. The ground and second stories are made of four plate stones whose corners are engraved with imitation corner pillars. From the third story on up, each story is made from a single piece of stone with engraved imitation corner pillars. The angled rafters and eaves of the roof stones conveys linear expansion. The top ornaments (finials) are missing but the pagoda follows the typical pattern of the plain Silla pagodas. This 9.6/31.5 ft high stone pagoda was built during the Goryeo Dynasty. This is Tangible Cultural Property #276.

=== Unjusa Ssang-Gyochamun Chilcheung Seoktap (Seven-Storied Stone Pagoda with Crossing Pattern at Unjusa) ===
This stone pagoda is situated just in front of the Seated Stone Buddha with Nimbus. The pagoda base is a large square stone. The appearance of this pagoda follows the traits of the Silla pattern, but the body stones of the pagoda wear unique patterns - crossing "X" markings on the face and diamond "<>" markings on the corners, not found on other domestic stone pagodas. The pagoda is 7.75m/25.4 ft high. This is Tangible Cultural Property #277.

=== Unjusa Chilcheung Seoktap Facing Unjusa Seokjo Bulgam (Seven-Storied Stone Pagoda Facing the Stone Buddha Shrine at Unjusa) ===
The body of this stone pagoda was constructed directly on a very low foundation stone, which differs from the other pagodas that incorporate much larger foundation stones. This foundation stone is 5 cm/2in high at the base of the pagoda. The angles of the four roof hips are not acute but are gently sloped in the style from the Baekjae Dynasty (18 BCE – 660 CE). This pagoda standing 7.5m/24.6 ft high was erected during the Goryeo Dynasty, posing stably with the harmonizing proportions between the width of the roof and the height of the pagoda. This is Tangible Cultural Property #278.

=== Geobuk Bawi Gyochamun Chilcheung Seoktap (Seven-Storied Stone Pagoda with Crossing Pattern on a Turtle-Shaped Rock Base) ===
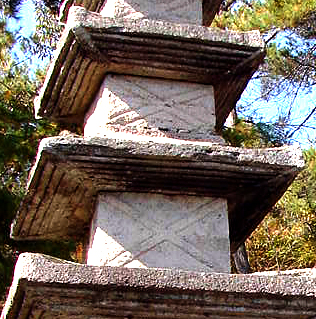
Distinctive X pattern on Geobuk Bawi Gyochamun Chilcheung Seoktap

This pagoda is situated on a rock base called "Turtle Rock", which is somewhat sloped to one side. The base of the pagoda is placed on the level portion of the rock. There are "X" patterns on the four sides of the body from the second story up to the seventh story. The roof stone represents the touch of the Baekjae Dynasty with a projected hip that is rare in the traditional Korean stone pagoda. This construction trait belongs to the characteristic Baekjae era stone pagoda as seen during the Goryeo era. The height of this pagoda is 7.17m/25.5 ft. This is Tangible Cultural Property #279.

=== Dacheung Seoktap (Multi-Storied Stone Pagoda Facing the Main Worship Hall) ===
Four stories of the body and the roof is all that remains of this stone pagoda. All other parts of the pagoda have been lost. The type of roof stone found here differs from the common roof type normally found here. The roof has three steps similar to that found on the brick pagodas, designed to look like a tiled roof. This roof design is comparable to that of the stone pagoda at Wolnamsazi in Gangjin. The height of this pagoda is 3.23m/10.6 ft and was erected during the Goryeo Dynasty. This is Tangible Cultural Property #280.

=== Chilcheung Seoktap Facing Chilseong Bawi (Seven-Storied Stone Pagoda Facing the Seven-Star Rock) ===
Only the body part of this pagoda was erected on the large stone bed called "Chilseong Bawi" or Seven-Star rock, no foundation or stone base was used. At the corner of each facet of the body, imitation pillars are carved in a somewhat heavy manner. The roof stones of each story have the same linear line as angled rafters, with eaves elevated at each corner to shed rain. The top roof stone serves as an ornament or finial. This stone pagoda is 7m/23 ft in height and was erected during the Goryeo Dynasty. This is Tangible Cultural Property #281.

=== Balwoohyeong Dacheung Seoktap (Rice-Bowl-Shaped Multi-Storied Stone Pagoda) ===
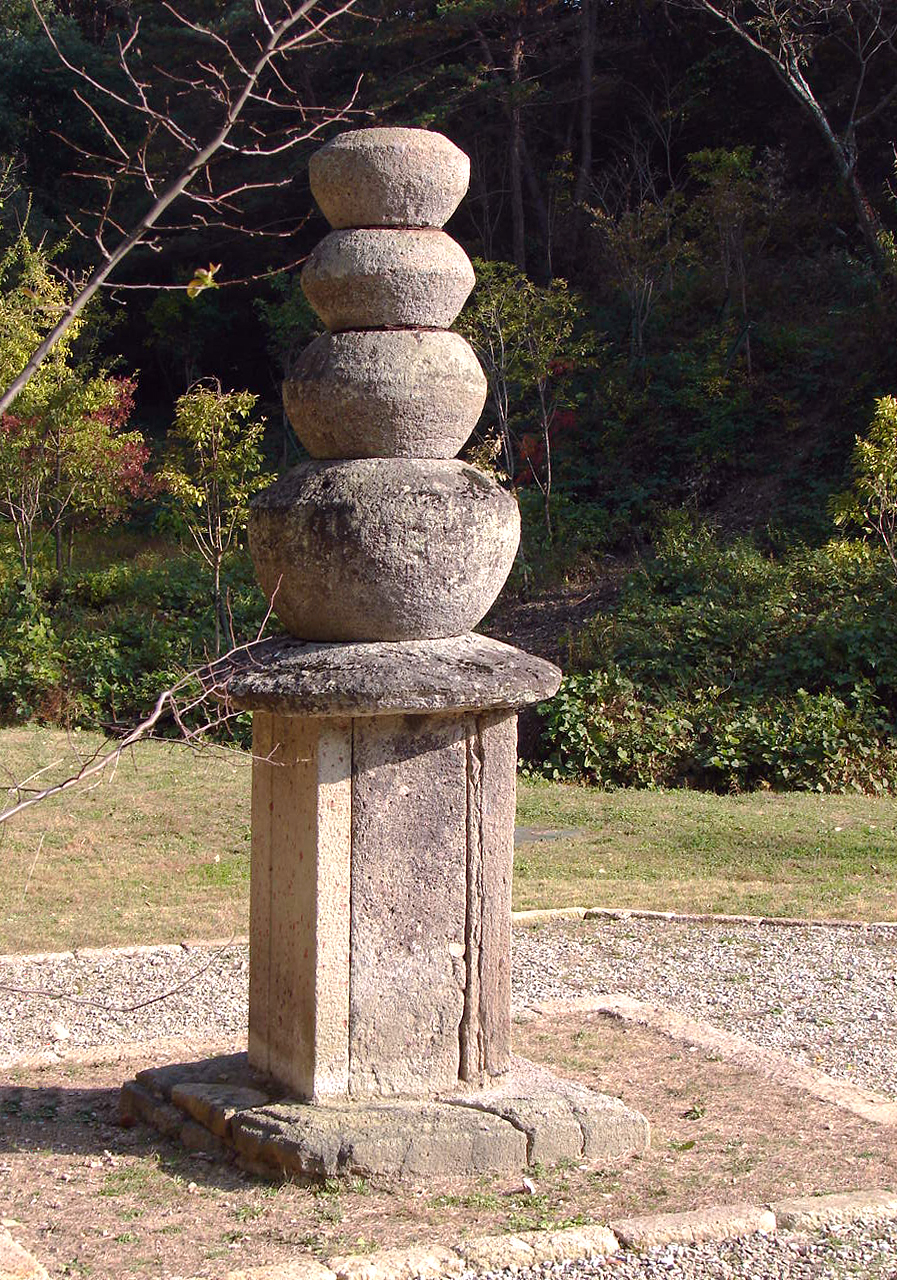
Balwoohyeong Dacheung Seoktap

This pagoda transcends what would typically be expected in a stone pagoda. The design of the first and third stories is like that of a bead on an abacus. The faces of the second and fourth stories are smooth and rounded. Presently only four of the bead-shaped stories remain. According to the Joseon Gojeok Dobo (an illustrated book on the historic remains of stone structures), this stone pagoda used to have seven stories above the foundation stone. Despite the three different shapes seen here, the construction imparts a peaceful feeling. The height if this pagoda today is 4.15m/13.6 ft and was erected during the Goryeo Dynasty. This is Tangible Cultural Property #282.

=== Treasures and Properties Gallery ===
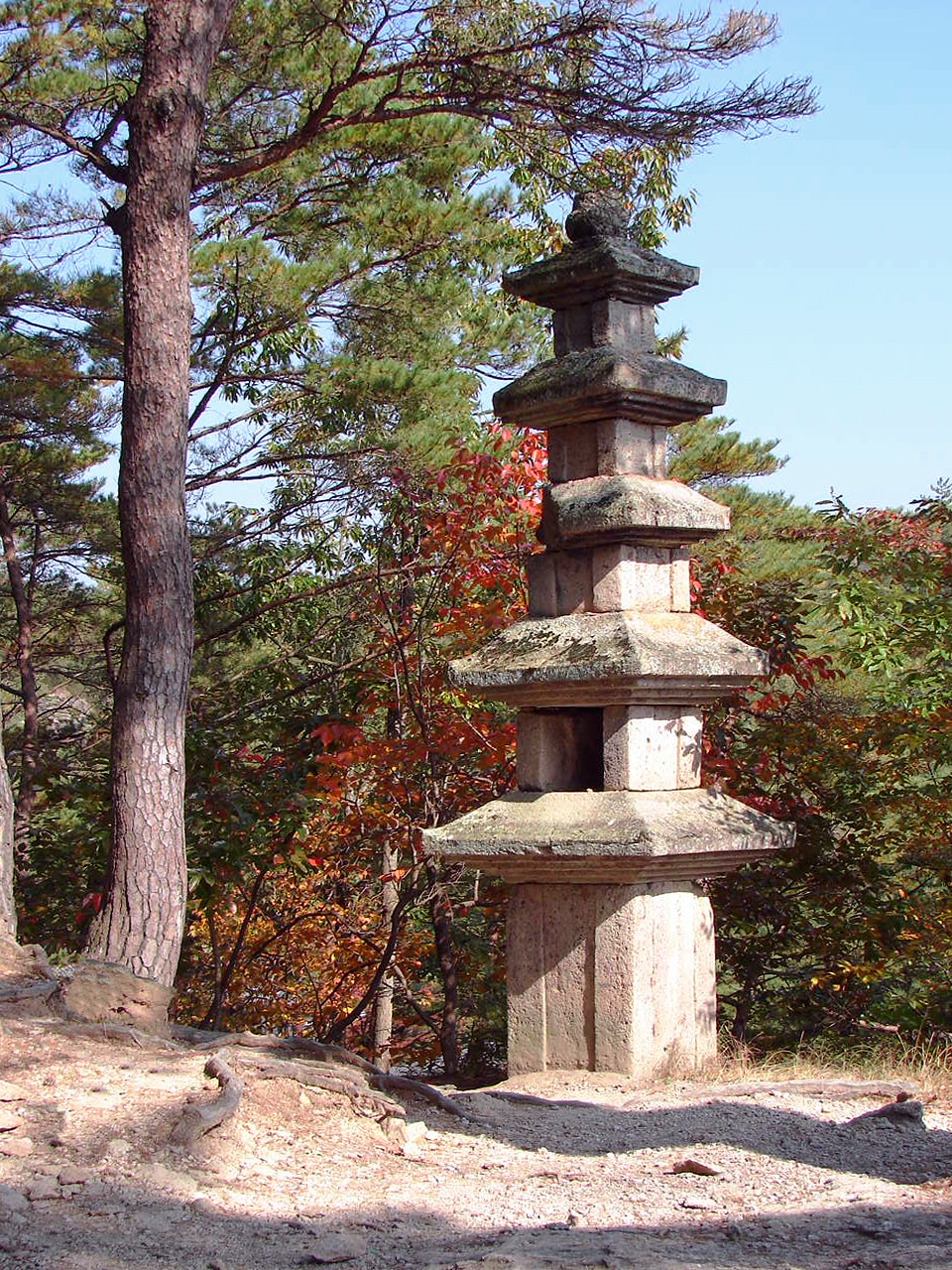
Geobuk Bawi Ohcheung Seoktap

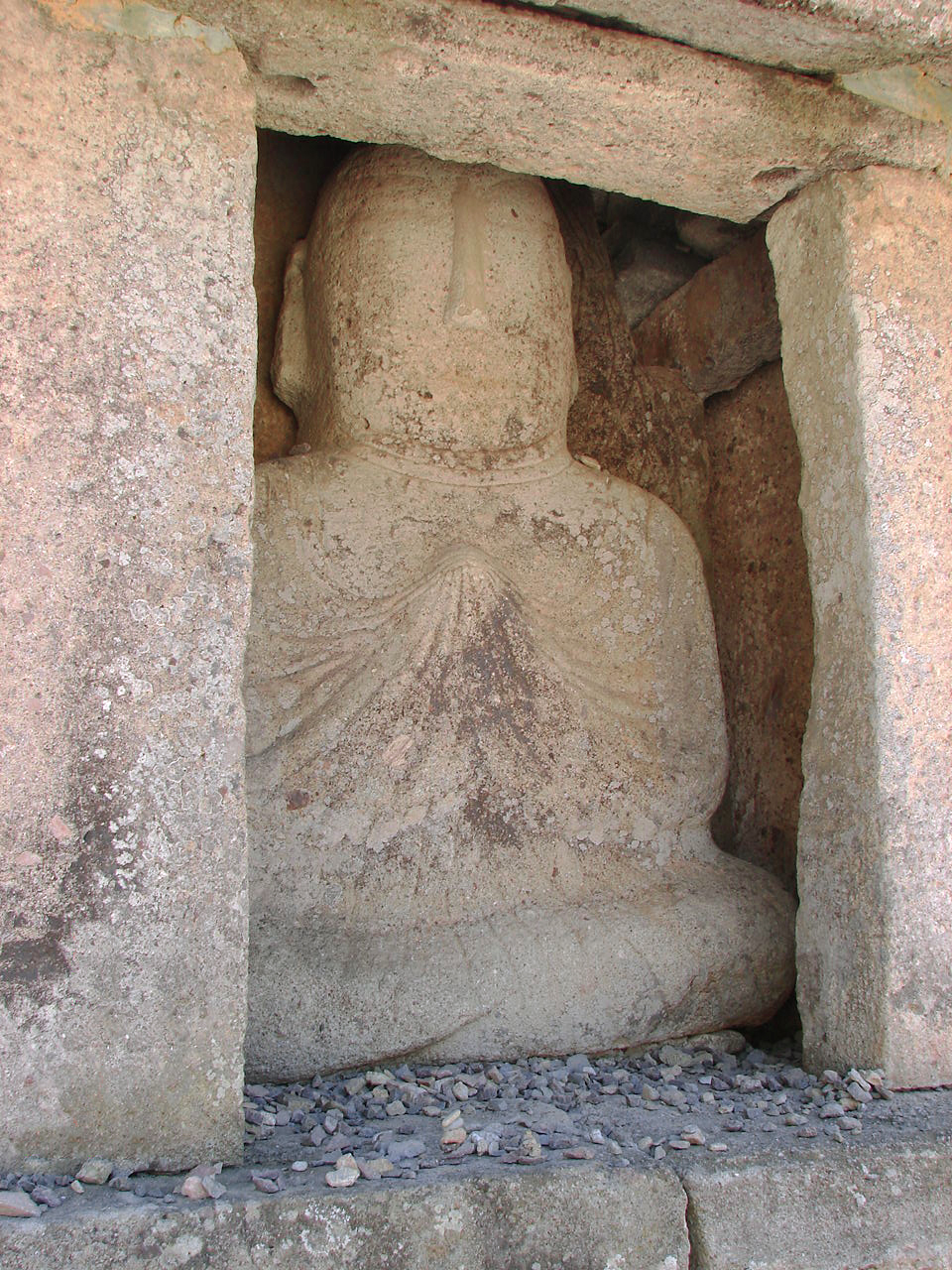
Seoktap Bulgam Buddha-north facing Buddha

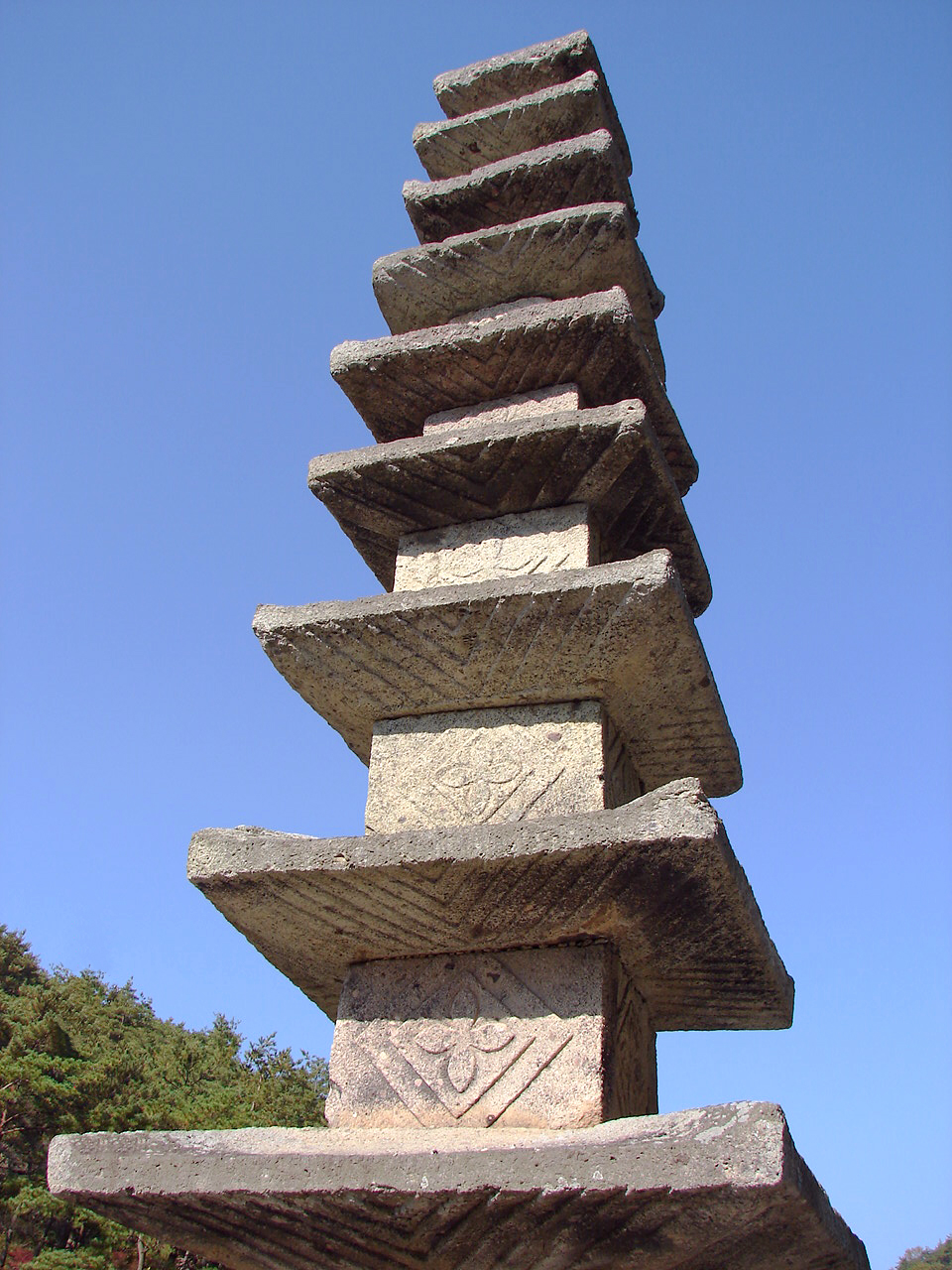
Gucheung Seoktap

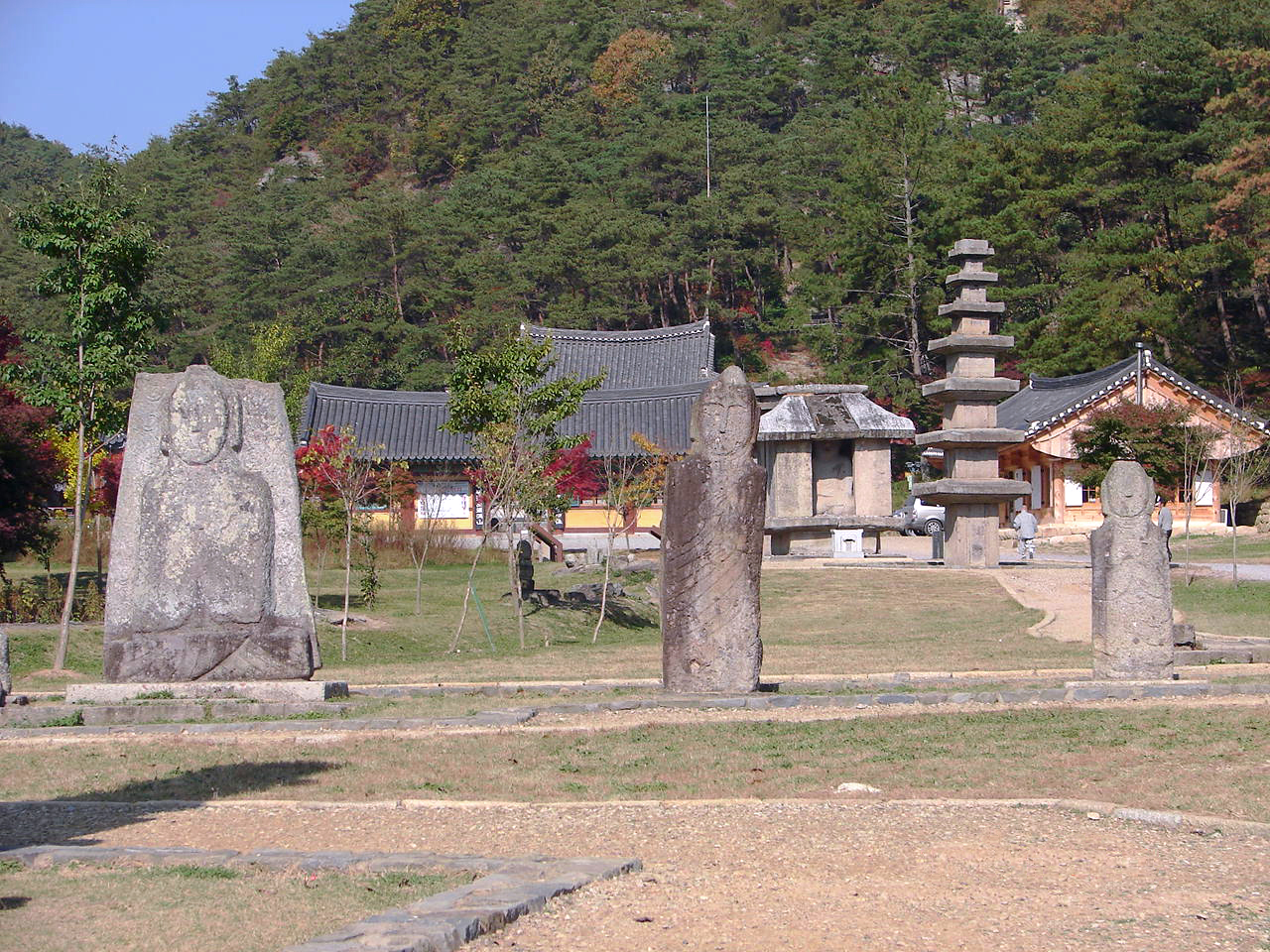
Kwangbae Soekbul-Jwasang
