= Korean garden =

Type of Asian garden

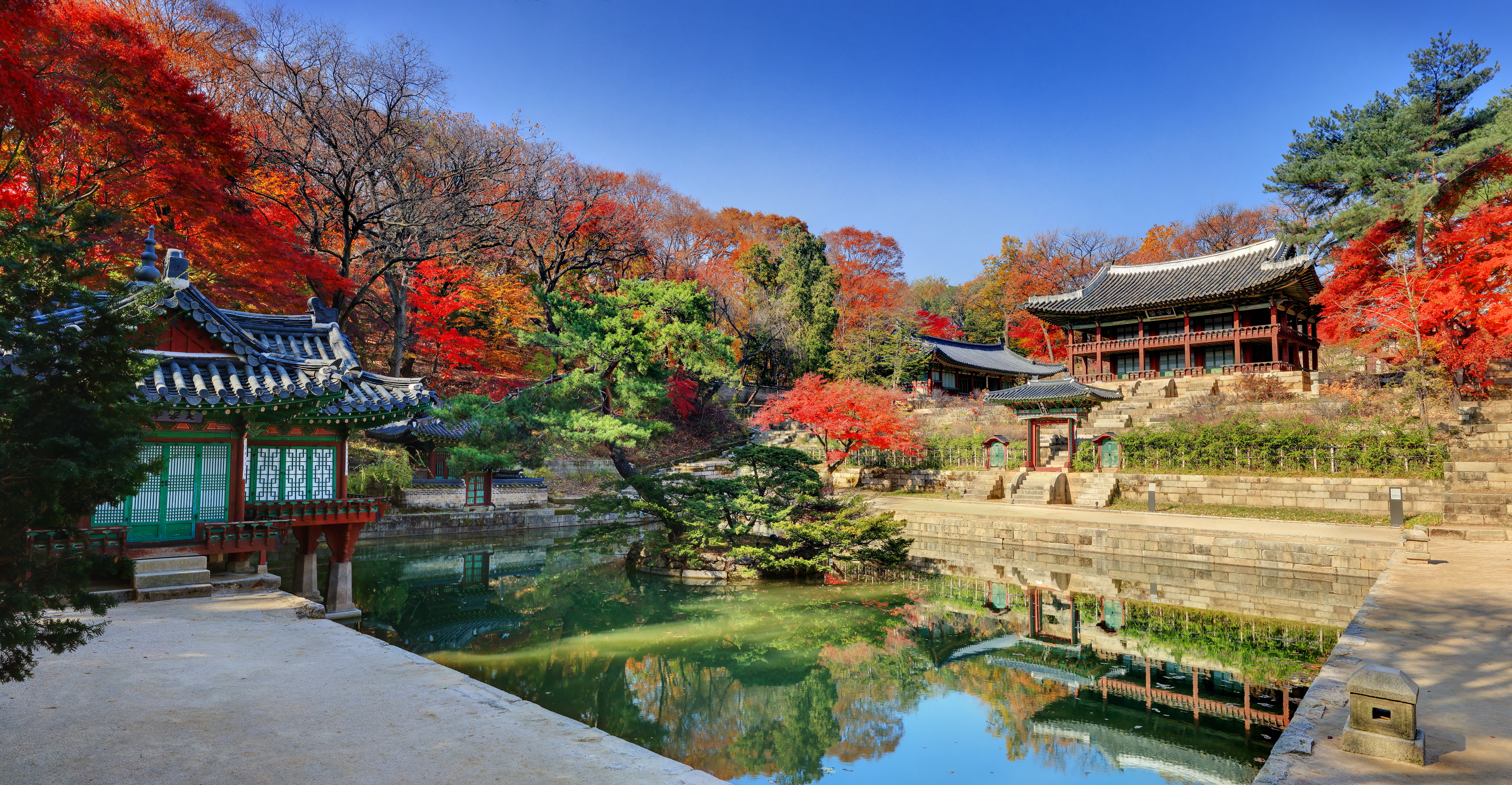
Secret Garden of Changdeok palace

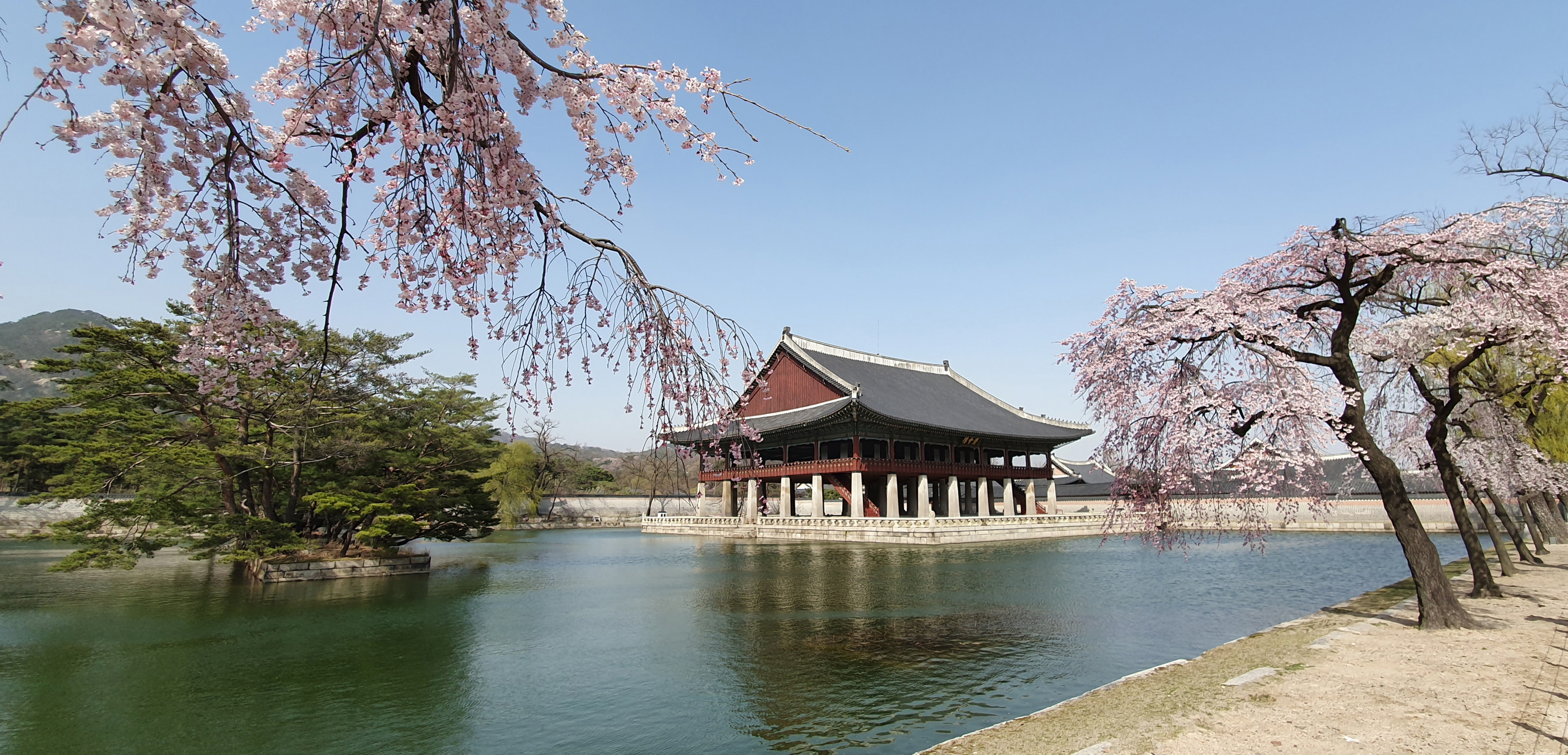
Gyeonghoeru Pavilion of Gyeongbokgung Palace

Korean gardens are a type of garden described as being natural, informal, simple and unforced, seeking to merge with the natural world. They have a history that goes back more than two thousand years, but are little known in the west. The oldest records date to the Three Kingdoms period (57 BC – 668 AD) when architecture and palace gardens showed a development noted in the Korean History of the Three Kingdoms.

== History ==
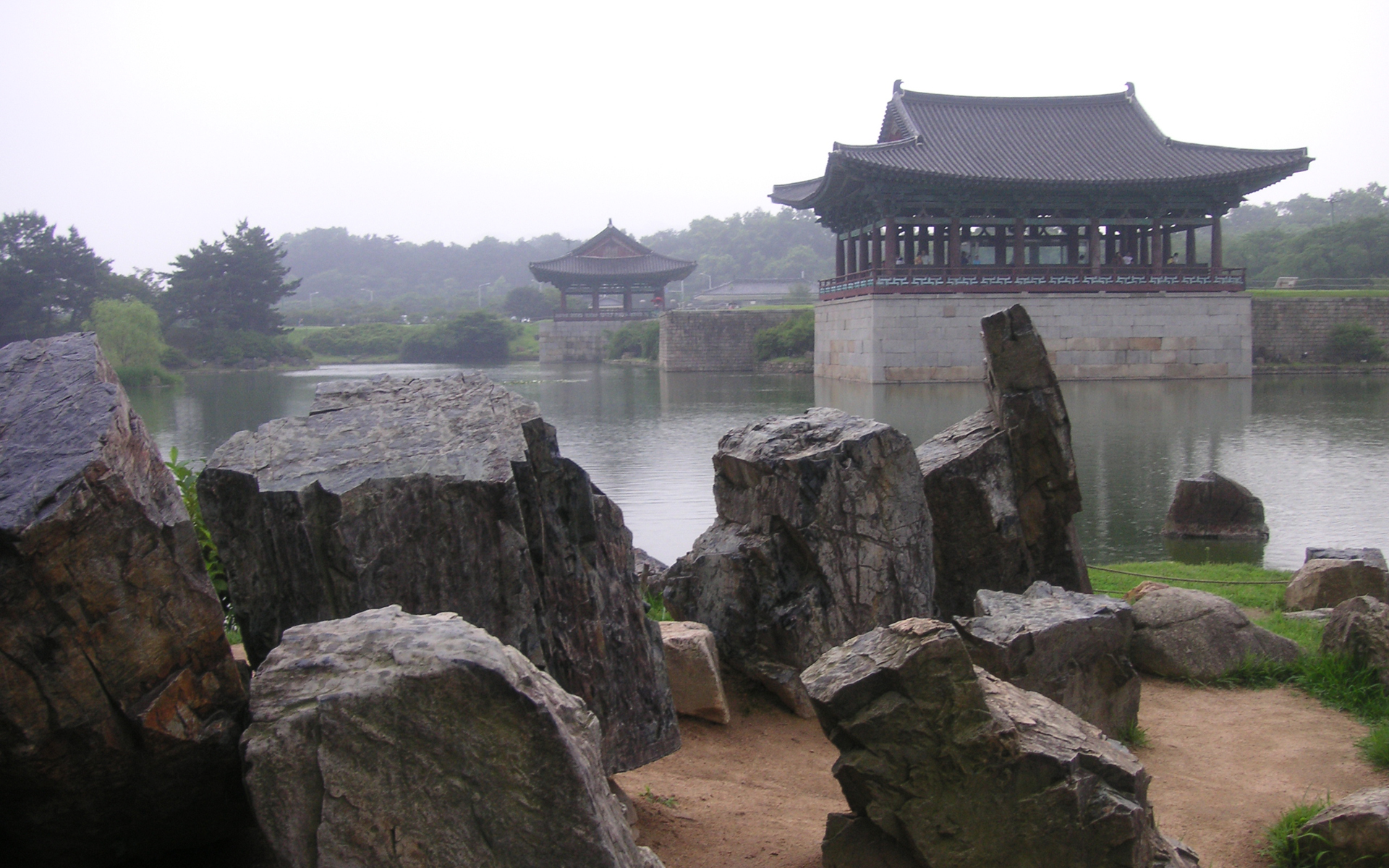
Donggung Palace and Wolji Pond

Korean garden culture can be traced back more than 2,000 years. In recent years, 300 documents have been found, written during the Koryo (918–1392) and Choson (1392–1910) dynasties, that contain detailed records about traditional Korean gardens, many of which survive and can be visited today.

In prehistoric times, Koreans worshipped nature, the sun, stars, water, rocks, stones, and trees. They especially believed that rocks had more power than water and other things in nature. Also, they have believed that rocks engendered God's good-will. Therefore, the arrangement of rocks is considered one of the "essential" elements in designing the traditional Korean garden. Koreans have recently rediscovered their stone garden tradition in the stacked stone altars that express the ancient concept of a round heaven and square earth. Also Susok or "rock arrangement," gardens are commonly found. In recent years, in fact, there has been a revival of interest in rock arrangements in gardens. In general, Korean Susok (rock arrangement) garden culture can be described according to its stages of development. Even during the primitive agricultural period, stones were an essential element in building gardens. Then, rock arrangements for shamanic rituals were built in the shape of shrines or heavenly altars.

During the Three Kingdoms period (57 BC – 668 AD), palace gardens were erected on a grand scale with stones. And in the 4th-century temple gardens were introduced along with Buddhism. Since the early Koryo dynasty, when Buddhism was established as the national religion, gardens evolved into the style of Hwagye (terraced rock garden), which represented Son (Zen) Buddhist rock arrangements. In the middle of the Koryo period, a new style of stone garden, called Imchon, which contained a pavilion and a stone pond in beautiful forest surroundings, became popular. During the Joseon dynasty, the Hwagye garden style was popular in the yards of many homes, and mansion gardens were usually built in Imchon style.

== Style and symbolism ==
Korean gardens are structured to live in harmony with pre-existing landscapes. Sites are chosen in favor of the energy flow called pungsu 풍수, geomancy which affects all aspects of life including health, wealth, and happiness. Unlike gardening styles of the west, the construction of a Korean garden must be done with as little disruption to the pre-existing site as possible, and can even lend from the surrounding view, such as mountains on the horizon, into its own appearance. The gardens can be found enclosed within walls of stone or brick or can blend seamlessly into its surroundings without a barrier.

Buildings and pavilions in the gardens are minimal in number and unobtrusive to the thriving natural landscape. Stylized flowers and blossoms that hold great symbolism, such as the Sacred Lotus and plum blossoms, are painted onto Buddhist temples, royal tombs, and palace pavilions in bright yet harmonious colors; a style called dancheong 단청, or “red and blue/green.”

Traditional spiritual and philosophical symbolism can be found throughout Korean gardens; Shamanistic, Animist, Buddhist, Daoist, and Confucian influences along with homage to the Dangun Creation story are often simultaneously represented. From the clear symbols such as stylized decorations painted on pavilions and buildings, to the use of colors and the number and types of trees, rocks, ponds, and plants, all Korean gardens hold a significance of beauty aesthetically, culturally, and spiritually.

Examples of Tree Types and their Meanings:

Persimmon: The Persimmon tree symbolizes transformation. Jill Mathews, author of Korean Gardens, writes, “… their fruit starts off hard, green, and extremely bitter but ripens to a bright orange and becomes very soft and sweet…”

Korean Red Pine: Symbolizes loyalty, constancy, and righteousness. The bark resembles the shell of the tortoise, which symbolizes longevity. Often used near Confucian scholarly buildings and pavilions. Called sonamu 소나무 meaning supreme tree.

Bamboo: Simplicity, integrity, flexibility. Its uprightness symbolizes strength while its hollow stem equates to open-mindedness.

Crepe Myrtle: Baerong Namu 배롱나무, meaning “Tree with flowers lasting more than 100 days”, symbolize integrity and loyalty of Confucian scholars and can be found in Confucian academy gardens.

Flowers:

Peonies: Known as the Queen of Flowers, both the tree peony and the herbaceous peony symbolize royalty, riches, honor, female beauty, and love.

Lotus: The lotus is recognizable as a sacred symbol in Buddhism and can be found in ponds of both Buddhist temples and Confucian academies, symbolizing purity, transformation, and enlightenment.

Rocks: The symbolism of rocks can be found in their number and structure, for instance, three rocks in an arrangement can represent the three mountain gods in the Dangun creation story. Matthews notes that, “… rocks appear in two’s, three’s, nine’s, or twelves, although there are occasional extravagant arrangements of sixty.” Rocks can be selected and assigned special names either based upon their appearance, or some unconnected meaning, however, no stones are taken from far distances and added to the garden.

Ponds: Ponds symbolize tranquility and stillness; inviting deep contemplation from visitors. Their bridges can symbolize moving from lower thought processes to more sacred thoughts, or the movement from life on Earth into the tranquil afterlife. The Daoist and Confucian belief that heaven is round and the Earth is square is often reflected in the appearance of ponds and their island; the pond being square in shape and the island being round. "Few Korean gardens are considered complete without at least one pond."

== Representative Korean gardens ==
The most central and representative and relatively undisturbed classical Korean gardens are in three complexes.

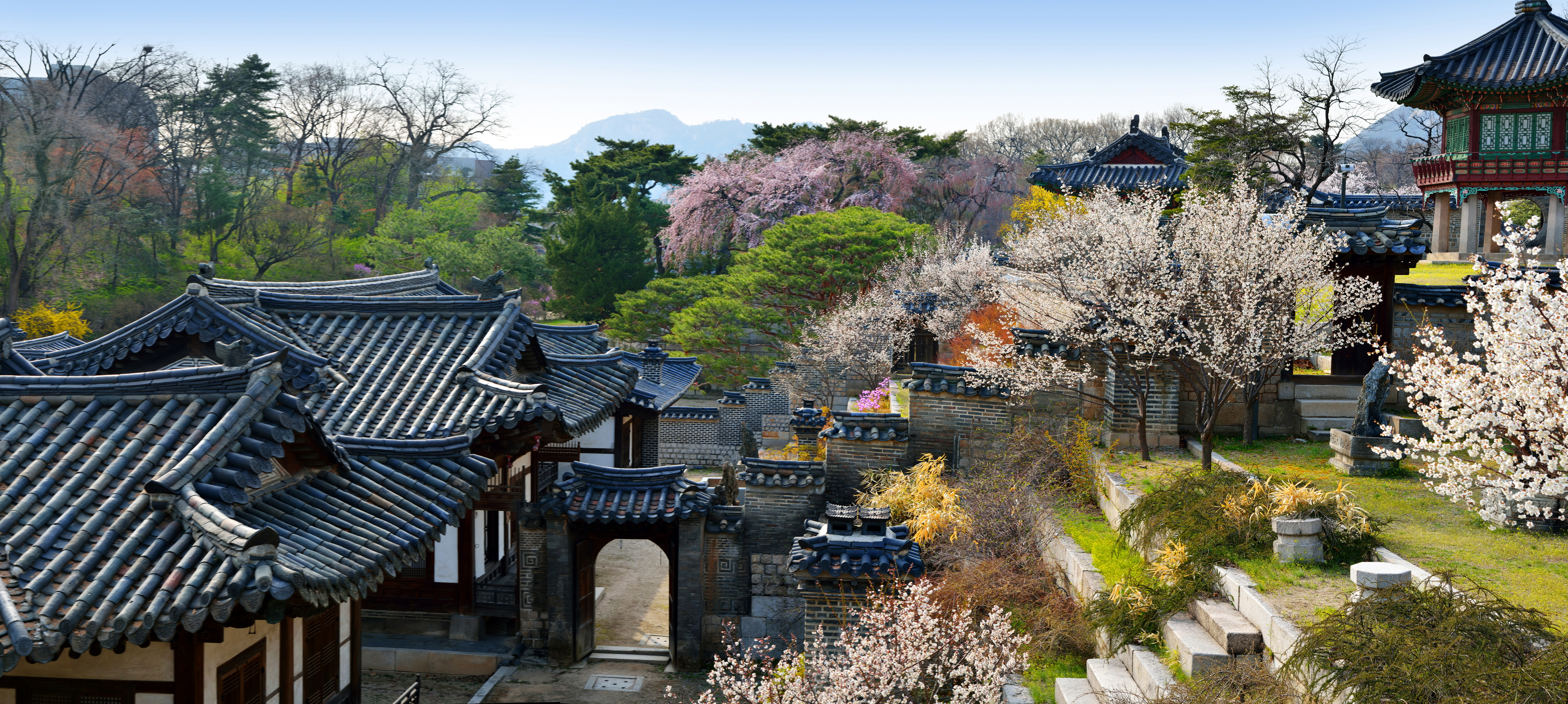
Changdeokgung Nakseonjae

- The Iseong mountain fortress of Baekje near Seoul, where one finds numerous rockeries depicting turtles, dragons or phoenixes
- The Anak Palace Garden of Goguryeo near Pyongyang, where one finds the remains of three rock Garden complexes.
- The Anapji Garden of Silla in Gyeongju is perhaps the best known, with three islands in the pond, man-made waterfalls in two tiers, granite basins of round and square design as well as hundreds of rock arrangement along its curbed shore.

Further important gardens, often historical recreations, are found at these sites:

- The rear garden of Changdeok Palace in Seoul, especially the Buyong pond with the pavilion of cosmic union.
- The Chongpyeong-sa temple near Chuncheon.
- Soswaewon

== Korean gardens abroad ==
A traditional Korean garden was inaugurated in Nantes, France in 2006. "Colline de Suncheon" ("Suncheon Hill"), a 5000 square metre site, is enclosed within Blottereau Park and celebrates the 120th anniversary of diplomatic ties between South Korea and France. There are traditional Korean gardens in the Chapultepec Zoo in Mexico City; Gençlik Park in Ankara, Turkey; in Cairo, Egypt; le Jardin d'Acclimatation de Paris; Erholungspark Marzahn in Berlin; Grüneburgpark in Frankfurt; and at the VanDusen Botanical Garden in Vancouver, Canada. The Korean Ambassador's Residence Garden in Washington, D.C. is a typical example of a well-maintained Korean garden.

== See also ==
- Culture of Korea
- East Asian gardens
- History of Korea
