= List of benefit corporations =

This is a list of benefit corporations.

== A ==
- ACT
- ABHATI Suisse
- Aledade
- Allbirds
- Alter Eco
- Anthropic

== B ==
- Beau's All Natural Brewing Company
- Ben & Jerry's
- Beneficial State Bank
- Bluesky Social
- Brew Dr. Kombucha
- Broadway Financial Corporation
- Bullfrog Power
- Business Development Bank of Canada
- Buy Nothing Project

== C ==
- Cabot Creamery
- Care2
- Cariuma
- Carrot Rewards
- Casebook PBC
- Change.org
- Chiesi Farmaceutici
- Corporate Knights
- Cost Plus Drugs

== D ==
- Danone North America

== E ==
- Ecosia
- EcoZoom
- Eileen Fisher
- Equity Schools
- Ethique

== F ==
- FlipGive
- Free Range Studios

== G ==
- Gifts for Good
- Greyston Bakery

== H ==
- The Honest Company
- Hootsuite
- Healthy Kids Programs

== K ==
- Kagi (search engine)
- Kickstarter
- King Arthur Flour

== L ==
- Lemonade
- LNP Media Group

== N ==
- New Belgium Brewing Company
- New Resource Bank
- North Coast Brewing Company
- Numi Organic Tea

== P ==
- Pallet
- Patagonia
- Picaroons Traditional Ales
- Planet Labs
- Posit PBC
- Public News Service
- ProCook

== S ==
- Saxbys Coffee
- Seventh Generation Inc.
- Sustainable Produce Urban Delivery

== T ==
- The Green Engineer, Inc.
- Thrive Market
- Tillamook
- Tofurky

== U ==
- UncommonGoods
- United Therapeutics
- Utne Reader

== V ==
- Veeva
- Vermont Creamery
- The Vita Coco Company

== W ==
- Warby Parker
- Walden University
- Wieden+Kennedy

== Y ==
- YouCaring

== Z ==
- Zevia
