= Context-Based Sustainability =

Context-Based Sustainability (CBS) – also known as Context-Based Accounting – is an integrated accounting methodology relative to upper and lower limits in, and demands for, vital resources (i.e., capitals) in the world. It uses open-source, triple/multi-bottom-line methods for measuring, managing, assessing and reporting the performance of individuals, groups, organizations, and other human social systems. As such, CBS is a performance accounting system that interprets performance through a sustainability lens, according to which impacts are sustainable if and only if, when generalized to a broader/responsible population, they would (or do) have the effect of preserving, producing and/or maintaining vital capitals at levels required to ensure human well-being (i.e., at levels that are sufficient). Impacts that would (or do) have the opposite effect are unsustainable, as are the activities that produce them.

The reference to context in CBS pertains to social, economic and environmental circumstances that give rise to entity-specific responsibilities or standards of performance grounded in sustainability principles. Such circumstances most importantly include: (1) the kinds of impacts an entity may already be having on social, economic and environmental resources/capitals people rely on for their well-being, (2) the kinds of impacts on resources an entity ought to be having, or not, by virtue of the relationships it has with others, (3) the specific supply of and/or demand for such resources, for and by those who need them, (4) the identities of such parties or groups to whom corresponding duties and obligations may be owed (i.e., stakeholders) to manage one's impacts on resources, and (5) the presence and identities of others, if any, with whom such duties or obligations may be shared. The combination of these circumstances gives rise to entity-specific standards of performance or norms for what an entity's impacts on vital resources or capitals must be in order to be sustainable and, therefore, responsible. Impacts can then be planned, measured and reported against such standards or norms in order to assess and manage performance in meaningful ways.

Because CBS involves the measurement, management and reporting of performance in context-based ways, references to its workings are sometimes made using derivative terms, like Context-Based Measurement, Context-Based Management, Context-Based Reporting, Context-Based Targets, Context-Based Metrics, Context-Based Carbon Metrics, Context-Based Water Metrics, etc. All of that falls within the scope of CBS.

At the enterprise scale, carrying capacity also plays a critical role in making it possible to measure and report the integrated/sustainability performance of organizations. This is most clearly demonstrated through the use of CBS tools, methods and metrics, including the open-source MultiCapital Scorecard, most of which has been in development and use since 2005. Contrary to many other mainstream approaches to measuring the sustainability performance of organizations – which tend to be more incrementalist in form – CBS is explicitly tied to social, economic and environmental limits and thresholds in the world. Thus, rather than simply measure and report impacts in relative or marginal terms from one period to another, CBS makes it possible to compare the impacts of organizations to literal, entity-specific norms, standards or thresholds for what they (the impacts) would have to be in order to be not just empirically sustainable (i.e., which if generalized to a larger population would maintain the sufficiency of vital resources for human or non-human well-being), but also responsible.

== Thresholds and allocations ==
Organization-specific standards of performance can also be thought of as fair, just and proportionate shares of burdens or responsibilities organizations have to help preserve, produce and/or maintain vital resources in the world at levels required to ensure human well-being. In the vocabulary of CBS, this is very often explained in terms of thresholds and allocations. A threshold is a measure of the magnitude or size of a resource that must be preserved, produced or maintained (e.g., the volume of available renewable water in a watershed, or a livable wage level for employee compensation). An allocation, in turn, is a fair, just and proportionate share of the responsibility required to maintain a threshold, and which is assignable to an individual organization. Such assignments will either be shared or exclusive. An organization's obligation to abide by its fair share of available renewable water in a watershed, for example, would be a shared responsibility; its obligation to pay its employees a livable wage and nothing less would be an exclusive one, borne only by itself.

In some cases, organization-specific standards of performance may also be science-based; in other cases, they may be purely moral or ethics-based. A science-based standard, for example, might consist of targets for the rate at which greenhouse gas emissions should be reduced over time in order to reverse climate change; an ethics-based standard, by contrast, might call for gender equality in organizations, or that the use of child labor be prohibited. In other cases, standards of performance might be purely legal or regulatory. In all cases, standards are expressed in terms of organization-specific shares (allocations) of shared and/or exclusive duties to maintain vital resources at levels (thresholds) required to ensure human and/or non-human well-being. Allocations thereby define organization-specific standards of performance, or norms, to maintain vital capitals at required (threshold) levels.

Importantly, all of this stands in stark contrast to most of what passes for mainstream practice in accounting today, which tends to be expressed in more incrementalist terms. Performance according to such incrementalism is all about how performance in one period compares to another, but only in terms of more of this or less of that. If profits go up, performance is positive; if energy efficiency goes down, performance is negative. At no time, however, do such measures express the sustainability of impacts - only their incremental or relative movements from one period of time to another.

== Multicapitalism vs. monocapitalism ==
CBS is also capital-based in the sense that it is an accounting implementation of what many are now referring to as multicapitalism. Multicapitalism is a relatively new economic doctrine according to which the performance of an organization, economy, municipality, or any other human population, can be seen as a function of what its impacts are on the sufficiency of multiple vital capitals, and not just in terms of economic outcomes. From this perspective, modern-day capitalism can be seen as the practice of monocapitalism: the pursuit of development or growth in only one type of capital (economic), very often at the expense of all others (e.g., natural, human, social, constructed and intellectual). As a new economic doctrine, the concept itself, and the terms monocapitalism and multicapitalism were first developed and coined by Martin P. Thomas and Mark W. McElroy in 2014, and frequently discussed thereafter in various publications of theirs.

Under the multicapitalistic view of things, an organization's performance is favorable if and only if its impacts on all vital capitals (i.e., ones that have been determined to be material to itself) are sustainable. And to be sustainable, an organization's impacts on vital capitals must be in full compliance with whatever entity-specific standards of performance have been defined for itself. Anything less than sustainable performance in any material area of impact should, in principle, cause overall performance to worsen under the doctrine of multicapitalism and CBS, or what can also be referred to as multiple capital, multicapital, or multi-capital accounting. Making materiality determinations is therefore key in CBS, although not only for the sake of shareholders, but for other stakeholders as well.

Multicapitalism has its roots in economic theory going back to at least the early twentieth century. In 1906, for example, the economist Irving Fisher wrote: "A stock of wealth existing at an instant of time is called capital. A flow of services through a period of time is called income." By the middle of the same century, another prominent economist, Kenneth Boulding, had taken Fisher's definitions to the next level by applying the concept not only to economic capital per se, but to other capitals as well. In 1949, Boulding identified several other non-economic capitals that must be maintained in order to ensure human well-being, including human capital, cultural capital, intellectual capital, and geological capital, the last of which arguably corresponds to what today is referred to as natural capital.

By the end of the century, a growing chorus of scholars and practitioners in the field of sustainability were actively advocating for adoption of the multi-capital-based interpretation of the subject, including Donella (Dana) Meadows, who in 1998 wrote: "The Balaton working group agreed unanimously that the idea of capital - all forms of capital - is central to information systems for sustainable development … They allow the stock-flow analysis that can make indicators dynamic. And they begin to suggest a conceptual framework to keep track of the linkages among many forms of capital and to derive indicators that could help people and nations build up the several kinds of wealth that are necessary for a people-enriching, nature-preserving system."

In the sustainability/capital literature today - still heavily influenced by not only historical, but modern-day economists as well - capital is now commonly defined as a stock of anything that yields a flow of valuable goods or services important for human well-being. The consensus on multiple capitals, too, has largely settled on a framework of six primary types (i.e., natural, human, social, constructed, economic and intellectual), including several permutations or derivatives thereof. The idea behind every one of them, though, is the same: that human well-being is utterly dependent upon their continued and adequate existence. To diminish the sufficiency of any one of them is, in a word, unsustainable.

Central to the importance and application of multicapitalism to organizations and human social systems writ large is the further idea that capitals have carrying capacities that can be measured and quantified, and for which the responsibilities to maintain them can be attributed to individual actors (e.g., to organizations) in fair, just and proportionate ways. The carrying capacity of a stock of capital is the extent of demand for its goods or services it can support. Indeed, as resources that humans and other species rely on for their well-being, capitals do have their limits. In some cases, the limits are beyond our control (e.g., most natural or ecological capitals). In other cases, the limits are within our control because the capitals themselves are human-made. These are the anthropogenic capitals, or what some refer to as the anthro capitals (i.e., human, social, constructed, economic and intellectual capitals).

When taken together, the combination of multicapitalism, multiple capital accounting and the concept of the carrying capacities of capitals results in a newly informed approach to management, economics and accounting that interprets performance in terms of impacts on all capitals. Management, that is, is capital impact management; and performance accounting is all about measuring and reporting the effects of organizations' activities on the sufficiency of vital capitals relative to standards for what they (the impacts) would have to be in order to be sustainable. CBS, in turn, provides the underlying measurement and reporting system that managers in twenty-first-century enterprises can use to successfully navigate these new waters.

== Context-Based Metrics ==
One of the hallmarks of Context-Based Sustainability is its use of Context-Based Metrics (CBMs). Unlike other metrics used to measure, manage and report the sustainability performance of organizations (e.g., absolute and relative/intensity metrics), most CBMs, but not all, take the form of quotients that have two parts to them: 1) denominators that express organization-specific norms for what their impacts on vital capitals must be in order to be sustainable (i.e., equivalent to "allocations" as explained above), and 2) numerators that express their actual impacts on the same capitals. Thus, the sustainability performance (S) of an organization is equal to its actual impacts (A) on capitals divided by its normative impacts (N) on the same capitals: S=A/N (i.e., the Sustainability Quotient).

When the numeric values expressed in such quotient-based CBMs are computed, the resulting scores will either be less than 1.0, greater than 1.0, or equal to 1.0. Such scores can then be interpreted as follows: 1) for impacts on natural capitals, any score of less than or equal to 1.0 signifies sustainable performance; scores of greater than 1.0 signify the opposite; 2) for impacts on all other types of capital, the logic reverses: scores of greater than or equal to 1.0 signify sustainable performance; scores of less than 1.0 signify the opposite.

These scoring conventions reflect the difference between capitals that are anthropogenic or human made (human, social, constructed, economic and intellectual) and those that are not (natural). In order to be sustainable, impacts on anthropogenic capitals must be continuously regenerative, so that nothing less than minimum levels of sufficiency (i.e., in the carrying capacities of the capitals) are maintained. Impacts on natural capitals, by contrast, must be constrained, so as not to exceed the limits of what nature can renewably provide or regenerate by its own means. For impacts on natural capital, then, humans must live within their ecological means; for impacts on all other capitals, they must continually recreate the means to live.

Because Context-Based Sustainability and its derivative tools and methods, including the MultiCapital Scorecard (mentioned below) are open-source, most context-based metrics, too, are publicly available for widespread use. This includes context-based metrics previously developed by the non-profit Center for Sustainable Organizations (CSO), many of which are freely downloadable from its website. Of particular note is CSO's Context-Based Carbon Metric (originally developed and field-tested with Ben & Jerry's in 2006), which was the world's first science-based carbon metric and is still very much in use today.

== Evolution of CBS ==
The development of CBS was preceded by the Sustainability Context principle, a sustainability accounting concept first put forward in 2002 by the Global Reporting Initiative (GRI) in its Guidance for corporate sustainability reporting. And whereas the Sustainability Context principle is just that, a principle, CBS is a methodology that makes it possible to put the principle into practice. The CBS methodology was originally developed by Mark W. McElroy of the Center for Sustainable Organizations, a non-profit public charity in the U.S., as part of his doctoral dissertation at the University of Groningen in 2008. He and Jo van Engelen then more broadly promoted the concept in their 2012 book, Corporate Sustainability Management.

Also part of McElroy's doctoral dissertation in 2008 was a narrow application of CBS known as the Social Footprint Method (SFM). Like the Ecological Footprint Method (EFM), the SFM was intended to make it possible to assess the sustainability performance of a human social system. But unlike the EFM, the SFM focused on social, not ecological, sustainability performance. McElroy would later go on to develop an environmental application of CBS as well.

While initially confined to social and environmental performance, CBS was subsequently expanded in 2013 by McElroy and a colleague of his, Martin P. Thomas, formerly of Unilever, to include treatment of financial performance as well. This resulted in the world's first fully operationalized (and context-based) Triple Bottom Line performance accounting method: The MultiCapital Scorecard (i.e., an open-source integrated measurement and reporting system). A book by the same title was later published by Thomas and McElroy in 2016.

== Generally Accepted Integrated Accounting (GAIA) Principles ==
In 2020, the Center for Sustainable Organizations took steps to formally codify core CBS principles while also extending CBS into the realm of integrated accounting per se. Referred to as Generally Accepted Integrated Accounting, or GAIA, Principles, the resulting set of twelve postulates plays a role analogous to the one played by Generally Accepted Accounting Principles (GAAP) in financial accounting.

The GAIA Principles, in turn, provide a basis for differentiating between authentic (context-based) and inauthentic (incrementalist) sustainability measurement and reporting. Moreover, since the construct that makes it possible to integrate measures of financial and non-financial performance in a unified way is sustainability itself, the GAIA Principles also provide a solution to the question of how best to actually operationalize integrated reporting. By assessing all impacts in terms of sustainability (i.e., in terms of impacts on the sufficiency of all vital capitals, financial and non-financial), the resulting measures can be combined.

== Uptake ==
Notwithstanding the fact that the leading international standard for corporate sustainability reporting, the Global Reporting Initiative, has since 2002 been calling for the practice of what is referred to here as Context-Based Sustainability, the uptake and adoption of CBS is only now reaching an inflection point. This can be seen on at least three fronts: (1) Third-Party, Independent and Peer-Reviewed Assessments and Adoptions, (2) B Corporation Community Endorsements, and (3) Organizational Adoptions.

=== Third-party, independent and peer-reviewed assessments and adoptions ===
- In late 2015, the United Nations Environment Programme (UNEP) published a report entitled, Raising the Bar - Advancing Environmental Disclosure in Sustainability Reporting, in which the authors wrote:

"The context principle was introduced as early as 2002 when it was embedded in the second generation of the GRI reporting framework. However, partially due to lack of available guidance on how to apply context to the reporting, it has largely been absent in corporate reporting. In an effort to fill this context gap, several organizations have taken important steps to put scientific context back into sustainability reporting. At the core of the context-based reporting movement is the Center for Sustainable Organizations (CSO). CSO developed Context-Based Sustainability (CBS), a framework for implementing Sustainability Context through the use of thresholds and allocations." And in the same report, UNEP added "All companies should apply a context-based approach to sustainability reporting, allocating their fair share impacts on common capital resources within the thresholds of their carrying capacities."

- Also in late 2015, the Harvard Business Review published an article entitled, "A Better Scorecard for Your Company's Sustainability Efforts," in which the authors wrote:

"The terms 'context-based' and 'Sustainability Context' are accepted terminology for measurement and reporting that compare corporate impacts to social, economic, and environmental thresholds."

- In 2012, an international association of academics, corporate managers, consultants, analysts and standards-makers conceptually committed to CBS and interested in tracking its continued evolution was formed: the Sustainability Context Group (SCG). SCG now has over 150 members.
- Another notable application of CBS took the form of a project launched in 2010 by Dr. Stephanie Bertels, known as the Embedding Project, hosted at Simon Fraser University in British Columbia, Canada. Working with twenty corporate and non-profit partners, Bertels and her colleagues at the Embedding Project have been applying CBS principles for several years now on an international basis. Of particular additional interest is a publication put out by the Embedding Project in 2017 entitled, The Road to Context - Contextualising Your Strategy and Goals.
- Of additional interest to practitioners of CBS is a program being led by Ralph Thurm and Bill Baue of the Netherlands and U.S., respectively, known as Reporting 3.0. Reporting 3.0 is a project originally launched by BSD Consulting in Europe, and which is now taking place under the auspices of a German non-profit known as OnCommons. Its purpose, among others, is to more fully standardize the practice of CBS in business by publishing related guidance in the form of what it refers to as "Blueprints" for Data, Reporting, Accounting and New Business Models in commerce.
- In late-2019, a Memorandum of Understanding was signed between the Center for Sustainable Organizations, SustainAccounting and Social Accountability International (SAI), in which SAI announced its intention to create and administer the world's first Triple Bottom Line (TBL) accounting certification (Certified TBL) program for organizations. The SAI program will, in turn, be grounded in Context-Based Sustainability principles. SAI is otherwise known for its SA8000 certification program, which has been addressing workers' rights in organizations for more than twenty years. The Certified TBL program is currently in the process of being piloted (2022) and is expected to launch more broadly in 2023.
- Also in 2019, the United Nations Research Institute for Social Development (UNRISD) launched a 4-year project to create a new set of sustainability performance indicators for use by organizations around the world. Known as the Sustainable Development Performance Indicators (SDPI) project, the indicators proposed by UNRISD will be context-based to the fullest extent possible, further indicating the UN's strong commitment to Context-Based Sustainability as a methodology that organizations can use to assess their own sustainability performance and contributions to achieving the Sustainable Development Goals (SDGs).
- In September 2020, the Science Based Targets Network (SBTN), one of four components that make up the Global Commons Alliance, released its Science-Based Targets for Nature: Initial Guidance for Business report, that businesses and municipalities can use to set science-based targets for managing their impacts on the whole Earth system. Included in SBTN's guidance are specific provisions for translating ecological boundaries, limits and thresholds into entity-specific fair-share allocations that can be used to plan, measure, manage and assess performance in those terms (see pp. 34–35).
- In December 2021, the Impact Management Platform (IMP), a collaboration between leading providers of public good standards and guidance for managing sustainability performance, publicly declared its conceptual commitment to the Thresholds and Allocations principles endemic to Context-Based Accounting. Standards makers involved with IMP include B Lab, the Global Reporting Initiative (GRI), CDP, the Capitals Coalition, OECD, several UN agencies, the Value Reporting Foundation, and many others.
- Perhaps the most significant event in the evolution of Context-Based Sustainability (CBS) took place on November 1, 2022, when the United Nations Research Institute for Social Development (UNRISD) published its groundbreaking Authentic Sustainability Assessment report, in which it (a) formally advocated for the use of CBS across the triple bottom line by all organizations in the world, and (b) provided a set of fully developed context-based metrics that organizations can use to do so.

=== B Corporation community endorsements ===
- In 2017, the CBS-based MultiCapital Scorecard was formally endorsed by B Lab, creators of Certified B Corporations and the Benefit Corporation form of incorporation, as an approved Third-Party Standard for measuring and reporting the performance of Benefit Corporations.
- In September 2015, California attorney John Montgomery, President-Elect of the Benefit Company Bar Association in the U.S. published an online book review of The MultiCapital Scorecard, in which he wrote: "The MultiCapital Scorecard has particular relevance to benefit corporations, which are required by law to create public benefit by providing a material positive impact on society and the environment, or in Delaware's case, by operating in a responsible and sustainable manner. Social and environmental impact assessment tools, such as B Lab's Certified B Corporation assessment, provide a measure of social and environmental impact but are not context-based and leave businesses accounting for their performance with traditional fiscal accounting and nothing more."
- In early 2018, Frederick (Rick) Alexander, head of Legal Policy at B Lab, published a book entitled, Benefit Corporation Law and Governance - Pursuing Profit with Purpose, in which he acknowledged the important distinction between monocapitalism and multicapitalism, while also citing the MultiCapital Scorecard as a notable implementation of the latter.

=== Organizational adoptions ===
Many organizations have embraced and implemented CBS and its context-based metrics to one degree or another, including the following:

- Ben & Jerry's Homemade, Inc. was an early adopter of CBS and the Social Footprint Method and was also the first company to pilot the MultiCapital Scorecard.
- Biogen, Inc. was an early adopter of CBS and continues to use it as indicated in its annual Global Impact Report (2016, p. 46): "Our practice of setting science-based targets, when possible, is part of our broader commitment to Context-Based Sustainability, a rapidly evolving, cutting-edge approach to managing sustainability performance that takes resource needs and limits in the world explicitly into account."
- Cabot Creamery Cooperative (Agri-Mark, Inc.) was also an early adopter of CBS and has been its most aggressive and pioneering user. It has also embraced the MultiCapital Scorecard, which it has arguably taken further than any other company, particularly by the extent to which it has developed and applied context-based financial metrics, not just social and environmental ones.
- Lockheed Martin has long been using a Context-Based Carbon Metric, including in its annual Science of Citizenship report (2016, p. 41): "Our latest 2015 results outperform a science-based threshold to stabilize atmospheric carbon emissions. Using the Center for Sustainable Organizations' Context-Based Carbon Metric methodology, we produce less than our calculated threshold of emissions based on our contribution to gross domestic product (GDP)."
- Other users of CBS include Griffith Foods and Ernst & Young, both of whom have used a Triple Bottom Line implementation of CBS known as the MultiCapital Scorecard (MCS). Whereas Griffith Foods has used the MCS to assess its own operations, Ernst & Young has used it to assess the sustainability performance of whole countries (i.e., as an index of national well-being and as an alternative to GDP).
