= African Consensus =

African Consensus is an economic paradigm proposed in 2011 for sustainable development in Africa. It is built on practical experiences across the African continent together with shared experiences from other regions facing similar challenges. It merges existing efforts of civil society in such areas as renewable energy, community finance and empowerment, organic agriculture and water resource management, environmental and endangered species protection. It couples these with the pragmatic experiences of business and finance in an attempt to scale these efforts into viable economic models. Seeking a pragmatic path for development, it emphasizes the importance of heritage, cultural and identity protection with the need for economic advancement.

== African Consensus Forum ==
The African Consensus Forum is proposed as an annual event, chaired by Tanzania's president Jakaya Kikwete, to convene stakeholders from civil society, government, business and finance. It is intended to address major challenges of development and present a range of concrete experiences, as well as to outline practical solutions that are economically viable and scalable. The annual meeting will initially be held in Dar Es Salaam with plans for breakout meetings alternating in the five regional zones during the year.

== African Consensus Crisis Prevention Center ==
The African Consensus Crisis Prevention Center is an anticipated outcome of the Africa Consensus Forum to address crises of violence, which may arise over allocation of resources and resource benefits. African Consensus Forum will seek to anticipate crisis situations and offer a second track dialogue process toward economic solutions to prevent crisis. The center's work will be hosted by the secretariat. It should coordinate efforts with those initiatives ongoing in the African Union, and other initiatives active on the continent.

== History ==
The African Consensus concept emerged during the 2011 World Social Forum held in Dakar, Senegal. Drafting of the African Consensus Resolution was undertaken by NGO leaders working throughout the event (late January and throughout February 2011). Key spokespersons of the process were West African celebrity rapper Didier Awadi who is known for his outspoken activism, and Alioune Tine who has been a peace mediator in both Darfur and Ivory Coast. Leaders of the African branch of the World Social Forum were also deeply involved in the process.

Laurence Brahm was invited by these activists to help articulate the concepts and draft the original African Consensus Declaration that was tabled before the African Commission on Human and Peoples' Rights (ACHPR) NGO Forum two months later. The African Consensus Declaration was adopted by the ACHPR Forum in Gambia, in April 2011.

The United Nations Economic Commission for Africa picked up on the ideas in the declaration and held a drafting session in October 2011 to draft a document called "African Consensus Statement to Rio+20". It was presented at the United Nations Conference on Sustainable Development (Rio+20) during the conference summer 2012, incorporating the vision into the ideas of inclusive sustainability promoted by the UN system. The two documents – African Consensus Declaration and the African Consensus Statement to Rio+20 – underpin the economic paradigm by building a body of internationally recognized documentation.

In summer 2014, Tanzania's president Jakaya Kikwete summoned Laurence Brahm (the original drafter of the African Consensus Declaration) together with John Masuka (Tanzania's "father of inclusive finance") to the northern State House in Dodoma. There President Kikwete explained his own intention to convene the African Consensus Forum as a multi-stakeholder process between civil society, business-finance and government. Kikwete was one of the original conveners of the Helsinki Process, in his previous role as Tanzania's foreign minister. The Helsinki Process on Globalisation and Democracy calls for multi-stakeholder participation in resolving political and leadership challenges. By convening the African Consensus Forum as an extension of the Helsinki Process, Kikwete extended that process from the realm of governance to economics. The Uongozi Institute, a leadership organization that is an outcome of the original Helsinki Process, is the body where the African Consensus Institute is to be located. Expectations are for the African Consensus to convene each year in early December.

There is increasing recognition of the notion that Africa must have its own unique economic development paradigm created by Africans themselves. The view has increasingly shifted from the NGO and civil society networks to the mainstream. Books such as Africa Consensus by Ludger Kühnhardt, published in 2014 and articles by Kwame Marfo in Neo-African Consensus and Towards a just and sustainable world by CIDSE further attest to a global paradigm shift in the development narrative.

== Core principles and rights ==
The African Consensus economic paradigm is based on three core principles:

1. Protect ethnic diversity, indigenous identity, endangered species and environment;
2. Through community empowerment involving local financing for sustainable and socially responsible businesses;
3. Prioritizing environmental protection and community advancement.

African Consensus seeks to protect three core rights:

1. The right to ethnic diversity
2. The right to a culturally sustainable development
3. The right to water, food security and the protection of our natural environment.

African Consensus can be a framework for preventing violence and terrorism, which are often rooted in both economic and social marginalization of people from different identity groups.

== Core theme ==
It is proposed that African Consensus will be built upon the pan-African visions articulated by Mwalimu Julius Nyerere and Kwame Nkrumah, with regard to the global context the challenges of climate change and diminishing resources as they relate to developing countries. It is intended that it will adopt the multi-stakeholder approach of the Helsinki Process, and hopefully extending that process from politics and governance into the realms of economics, business and finance.

== Foundation documents ==
African Consensus is established as an economic paradigm based on two documents:

1. The African Consensus Declaration adopted by the African Commission on Human and People's Rights NGO Forum convened in Banjul, Gambia, April 2011
2. The African Consensus Statement to Rio+20 submitted by the Economic Commission on Africa jointly with the African Union, African Development Bank, UN ECOSOC, UNDEP and UNEP to the Rio+20 conference in Brazil, July 2012.

On the basis of these two documents African Consensus is intended to evolve during future African Consensus Forum meetings where stakeholders in the African continent – from civil society, business, finance, and government – will convene each year, with regional break-out meetings throughout the year, to define and articulate the aspirations and pathways to African development based on pragmatism, and experiences shared between stakeholders.

The African Consensus Forum "Green-print" will be the annual outcome document of each African Consensus Forum to serve as a green growth blueprint of development and a continuing reference of best practices articulated by the stakeholders each year.
