= Social purpose corporation =

For-profit that enables, without requiring, social or environmental decision making

A social purpose corporation (SPC) is a type of for-profit entity, a corporation, in some U.S. states that enables, but does not require, considering social or environmental issues in decision making. SPCs are similar to public benefit corporations (B corporations), with some distinctions.

== California ==
In California, "[t]he amendment, S.B. 1301, changes existing law (found under Corporations Code Sections 2500–3503) to emphasize the social-purpose nature of the flexible purpose corporations, most notably by changing its name to the "Social Purpose Corporation". With the law change, corporate directors are now required to account for company mission in decision making. A SPC must state that it has a specific purpose to pursue a public purpose that a traditional nonprofit corporation would normally have pursued. Because an SPC is a for-profit organization, they do not qualify for tax-exempt status as a nonprofit corporation.

S.B. 1301 took effect on January 1, 2015. On that date, extant FPCs automatically continued their existence as SPCs.

SPCs in California are also distinguished from California-based benefit corporations, which were first authorized by a separate bill, AB 361 (signed October 8, 2011). SPCs differ from benefit corporations in that SPCs retain greater flexibility of allowable corporate purpose, requirements for third-party evaluation (not required for SPCs), requirements for reporting on public and environmental impact (less stringent annual "benefit report"), and mechanisms for enforcement of corporate purpose (no method for SPCs outside of traditional methods such as shareholder lawsuits).

== Florida ==
Florida created both social purpose corporations and benefit corporations in 2014. The main difference between the two is that B corporations must pursue a "general public benefit", which applies to all of the company's activities, while SPCs may pursue a public benefit in limited areas. This example from the Florida Bar Journal illustrates this difference between SPCs and benefit corporations:

Suppose that a for-profit corporation plans to manufacture and sell an anti-malarial drug and, as part of its business plan, will distribute that drug at low or no cost in African countries. If distribution in Africa is the corporation's sole benefit purpose, the corporation could appropriately be a SP corporation. However, if the corporation is a B corporation, directors and officers would be mandated to consider as well employee programs, environmental concerns, community issues, and similar societal factors, and cannot concentrate on a single benefit program to the detriment of other general benefit concerns.

Shareholders, directors, and persons owning more than 5% equity in a Florida SPC may bring lawsuits against a Florida SPC for failure to pursue or create a public benefit, but the corporations, their directors, and their management are shielded from monetary damages in such lawsuits for failing to create a public benefit. Florida SPCs must prepare an annual report on the company's achievements towards its public benefit goals, but unlike Florida B Corporations, these reports do not need to be assessed by a third-party standard.

== Washington ==
Washington State passed the law for social purpose corporations in 2012. Florida became the second state to adopt social purpose corporations in 2014. Although there are no official requirements for social purpose corporations to have a positive social or environmental impact, most of the companies which have registered as social purpose corporations in Washington State, the pioneering state for SPCs, have a focus on social or environmental impacts.

== See also ==
- B Corporation (certification)
- Flexible purpose corporation
- Community contribution company
- Community interest company
- Social entrepreneurship
- Low-profit limited liability company
