= Casebook PBC =

US cloud computing public-benefit corporation

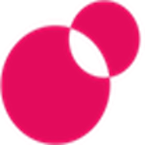
- Company type: Private
- Industry: Cloud computing; Software
- Founded: 2017
- Headquarters: New York, NY, U.S., New York, US
- Key people: Tristan Louis (president & CEO)
- Products: Human Services Platform; Provider Management System
- Services: Cloud computing
- Website: www.casebook.net

Casebook PBC is a US cloud computing public-benefit corporation headquartered in New York City. Incubated by the Annie E. Casey Foundation, the company initially developed child welfare solutions and has since expanded to provide a SaaS platform servicing the whole of Human Services organizations.

== History ==
Casebook initially started as Case Commons, a project of the Annie E. Casey Foundation under the leadership of Kathleen Feely, who was Vice-President for Innovation at the foundation.

In 2012, Indiana's Department of Child Services was the first state agency to implement Casebook as a web-based solution for its child welfare caseworkers. This effort led to the organization receiving the Design for Experience Award in 2014 and a Code for America Technology Award in 2015.

In 2017, the organization helped the state of California's Child Welfare Digital Services agency learn how to build and ship software. That same year, under the leadership of a new CEO, Tristan Louis, Casebook PBC entered into a national partnership with KPMG, allowing KPMG to leverage the Casebook platform as its exclusive solution for the child welfare vertical.

In late 2018, Assets from Case Commons were sold to Casebook PBC, a new organization founded by Mr. Louis with the purpose of building a SaaS platform for human services.

In mid-2020, the company started offering Case Management and Provider Management software aimed at not-for-profit organizations in social services..

== Products ==
The company offers the Casebook Platform, a set of core components that can be used for a variety of Human Services software developments.

In 2019, the company launched provider management software aimed at small and medium-sized providers in human services .

== Awards and recognitions ==
Casebook PBC was recognized as a govtech 100 company by Government Technology Magazine in 2019 through 2024 The company was also the recipient of the 2019 Stevie Awards for Innovation and Startup of the Year, and was named as one of the "2019 Best for the World" companies by B Lab. In 2020 Casebook received a mention at the Fast Company's 2020 World Changing Ideas Awards.
