= Andrew Kassoy =

American investor and business advocate

Andrew Kassoy (July 8, 1969 – June 22, 2025) was an American advocate of socially responsible capitalism and a private equity investor. He was a co-founder of B Lab, a nonprofit network promoting B Corporations with a social and/or environmental purpose. Before that, he worked in private equity for 16 years, including several years with Michael Dell's MSD Group. He was a graduate of Stanford University, where he studied political science.

Kassoy described his philosophy of capitalism as "you’re here to care, to care for your workers, your community, the planet, the other people that you do business with in your supply chain.”
