= Legami =

Italian stationery and gift company

Legami S.p.A. Società Benefit
- Type: Private benefit corporation
- Industry: Stationery
- Founded: 2003
- Founder: Alberto Fassi
- Headquarters: Bergamo, Italy

Legami S.p.A. Società Benefit is a company based in Bergamo, Italy, that designs, develops and distributes stationery, gift items and lifestyle products.

== History ==
Alberto Fassi founded the company in 2003 under the name R&D S.r.l. It was initially launched to commercialize the final project of the Master's programme in creativity and innovation that its founder had completed at the Università Cattolica del Sacro Cuore in Milan: a book strap. Following the success of this product, the company changed its name to "Legami", a word that in Italian refers both to emotional bonds and to an invitation to stay connected.

In 2009, Legami opened its first retail location at Milan Bergamo Airport. In the following years, it developed its distribution network in Italy and abroad and expanded its product range to include both stationery and gift items.

In 2018, the company launched its thermosensitive erasable pens. The products became widely popular and a collectible across Europe.

In 2023, Legami adopted the legal status of a Società Benefit, allocating 5% of its annual profits to environmental and social sustainability projects. Legami also launched Dreamland, a protected area established in Bergamo in 2023 for biodiversity restoration and conservation, which expanded to over 30 hectares in 2026. In the same year, the Flexible Capital Fund, managed by DeA Capital Alternative Funds, acquired a 42% stake in the company. Two years later, the De Agostini Group took over the fund's entire holding, becoming the company's second-largest shareholder after Alberto Fassi.

The company reported revenues of €245 million in 2024.

== Products and distribution ==
Legami distributes its products through direct retail, wholesale and e-commerce. The brand is distributed in more than 70 countries through 10,000 retailers and over 600 corners.

In 2026, Legami expanded its activities from products to content with We Are The Dreamers - La Battaglia delle Fragole, the debut novel by its founder Alberto Fassi.
