= Better World (disambiguation) =

"Better World" is a song by Rebel MC.

Better World may also refer to:

- Better World Books, an online bookseller
- Better World Club, an automobile association

== See also ==
- A Better World (disambiguation)
- Better The World
- One Better World
