= Community contribution company =

The community contribution company is a type of corporate structure set up in 2012 in British Columbia, Canada. It is intermediate between a commercial, for-profit, model, and the charitable, non-profit organisation. Traditionally, non-profit organizations either depend a combination of government funding, philanthropy, and earned income. This corporate model was set up to help build earned income to secure long-term growth.

== See also ==
- Benefit corporation, a similar type of legal organization in the United States
- Community interest company, a similar type of legal organization in the United Kingdom
- Social entrepreneurship, a practice which involves hybrid for-profit/nonprofit organizational strategies which community contribution companies are designed to accommodate.
- L3C, a similar type of legal organization in the United States
