= Uncommon Goods =

American online and catalog retailer

Uncommon Goods, LLC
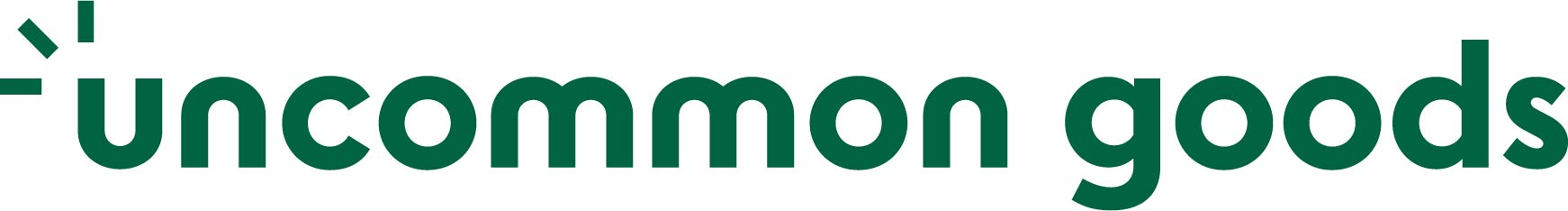
- Company type: Private company
- Industry: E-commerce
- Founded: New York City, US (1999)
- Founder: David Bolotsky
- Headquarters: Brooklyn, New York, United States
- Area served: Worldwide
- Key people: David Bolotsky, Casey McCarthy, Carolyn Topp
- Products: Handmade, small production gifts, home accents, jewelry, accessories, tabletop, art, games, books, food and drink, DIY kits
- Number of employees: 200 (2018)
- Website: www.uncommongoods.com

Uncommon Goods, LLC is a Brooklyn-based, privately held, American online and catalog retailer, founded in 1999. The Uncommon Goods website launched in July, 2000. The company sells small production gifts for children, teens, and adults, home accents, jewelry, accessories, kitchen and home entertaining items, art, games, books, food and drink, and DIY kits. About half of the assortment is handmade by independent artists and artisans, often using recycled, reclaimed, or upcycled materials.

== History ==
Uncommon Goods was founded in 1999 by current CEO David Bolotsky, a former managing director at Goldman Sachs who headed its U.S. Retail Research Division from 1995 to 1999.

== B Corp certification, Benefit Corporation ==
In 2007, Uncommon Goods became a founding B Corp, having met B Lab's standards. Founder and CEO Bolotsky advocated for the bill that made B Corporation status legal in New York State, which was signed into law in 2012. In 2016, 2017, 2018, 2019, 2021, and 2022, Uncommon Goods was honored as one of B Lab's Best for the World in the Community category. Bolotsky and Uncommon Goods helped successfully advocate for raising the minimum wage in New York state and for paid family leave in New York State.

== Honors and awards ==
2009–2020, Bizrate Circle of Excellence

2016, 2017, 2018, 2019, 2021, and 2022, B Lab Best for the World in the Community

2017, City and State Responsible 100 (David Bolotsky)

2018, New York Paid Family Leave Coalition Game Changer (David Bolotsky); Forbes Small Giants: The Best Small Companies of 2018
