= The Sak =

American fashion brand

- Company type: Private
- Industry: Fashion; Accessories
- Founded: 1989
- Founders: Mark Talucci; Todd Elliott
- Headquarters: New York City, United States
- Products: Handbags; accessories; footwear
- Parent: The Sak Brand Group
- Website: www.thesak.com

The Sak is an American fashion brand founded in 1989 in San Francisco by Mark Talucci and Todd Elliott. The company produces handbags and accessories and is known for its crochet and leather products. The Sak Brand Group became a certified B Corporation in 2022.

== History ==
The company was founded by Mark Talucci and Todd Elliott following a trip to Bali, Indonesia, where they were influenced by locally produced rattan goods that informed their early designs. The business was launched with approximately $20,000 in personal funds and initially operated from a garage in San Francisco. Early production focused on handcrafted and rattan handbags. Over the following years, the rattan handbags were distributed through specialty retailers and department stores in California.

In the mid-1990s, the company shifted to woven nylon and crochet-based designs marketed under the name The Sak, with crochet construction becoming a defining feature of its products. This transition coincided with expanded distribution through U.S. department stores, including Macy's, Nordstrom, and Dillard's. By the late 1990s, the company had grown into a multimillion-dollar business, with reported sales in the millions and expanded retail distribution. During this period, the "120 Hobo" bag became associated with the brand and was later referenced in coverage of its development.

In 2003, the founders introduced a separate label, Elliott Lucca. In 2006, the company launched an advertising campaign featured in fashion publications.

In 2019, the company marked its 30th anniversary with a limited-edition collection based on the "120 Hobo" design. Industry coverage reported that proceeds from the collection were directed to a fund supporting healthcare and education for female artisans in Bali. The Sak Brand Group became a certified B Corporation in 2022. According to the B Impact Assessment, the company received a score of 103.1, compared to 84.7 at the time of certification.

== Products ==
The Sak produces handbags and accessories, with designs often characterized by crochet construction and hand-crafted textures. The "120 Hobo" model is frequently cited in coverage of the company's development in the 1990s. Fashion and retail coverage have frequently identified the brand with hand-crafted textures, casual styling, and crochet-based construction.

== Operations ==
The company developed through wholesale distribution in department stores and specialty retail, alongside its own retail presence. Reporting has described the brand as originating in San Francisco and later operating from New York City.
