= G8 Education =

Australian childcare conglomerate

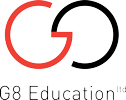
- Type: Public company
- Traded as: ASX: GEM
- Founded: 2006 in Australia
- Headquarters: Gold Coast, Australia
- Areas served: Australia
- Key people: Pejman Okhovat (CEO & Managing Director); David Foster (Chairman)
- Revenue: ▲ A$901 million (2022)
- Net income: ▼ A$36.6 million
- Total assets: ▼ A$1,784 million (2022)
- Number of employees: ▼9,808 (2022)
- Website: Official website

G8 Education is Australia's largest ASX-listed early childhood and care (ECEC) provider. Its 430+ childcare centres are marketed under 21 brands such as Kindy Patch Kids, Jellybeans, Kinder Haven, First Grammar, Community Kids, Pelicans Learning for Life and Casa Bambini. G8 Education's head office is located in Gold Coast., Australia. Across Australia, G8 Education cares for around 50,000 children every week and employs almost 10,000 employees.

== History ==
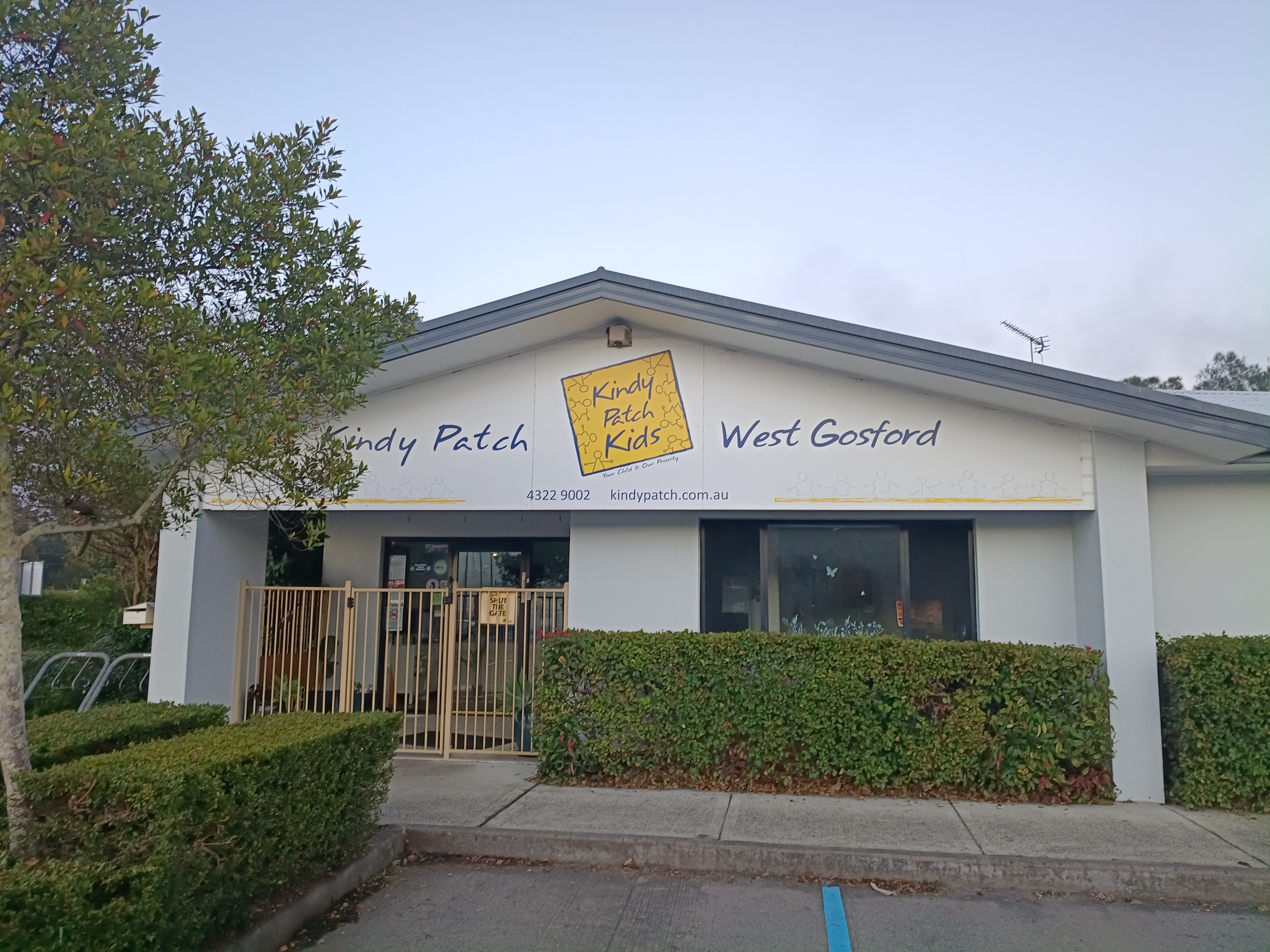
Kindy Patch West Gosford, one of the childcare centres operated by G8 Education.

G8 Education was founded in 2006 as Early Learning Services. In December 2007 it began selling shares on the Australian stock exchange, at a time when it owned 38 child care centres. In 2010, it merged with Payce Child Care Pty Ltd and the name was changed to G8 Education Ltd. By 2022 it had grown to 450 child care centres.

In 2010, it began operating childcare centres in Singapore, but in October 2020 exited the country by selling its childcare centres to a Singapore company.

In 2021 G8 Education established a specialist care division with the acquisition of specialist in-home care and NDIS provider Leor, a registered B Corp. The specialist care division offers early intervention and disability support, including individual learning programs integrated with recommendations of allied health professionals such as speech and occupational therapists.

== Sustainability and Social Impact ==
In 2021, G8 Education became the first early learning provider to execute a sustainability-linked loan (SLL) facility. The loan Key Performance Indicators were primarily focused on achieving “quantifiable and benchmarked social outcomes” including G8 Education's quality of education and care and the safety of G8 team members. In 2022, G8 Education linked its SLL to three key performance indicators: reducing carbon emissions, improving quality of education and care, and implementation of a Reconciliation Action Plan.

In a trial taking place since July 2022, G8 Education aims to minimise the environmental impact of more than 1.5 billion disposable nappies through a partnership with Kimberly Clark and Welly Road Early Learning Centre. The trial uses anaerobic digestion to turn disposable Huggies nappies into nutrient-rich compost.

In 2023 G8 Education sponsored the Australian Institute for Intergenerational Practice (AIIP) 2023 Symposium. The symposium consisted of practitioners, researchers, policy makers, and business innovators brought together with the purpose of re-connecting communities through the development, implementation, and evaluation of intergenerational programs. Intergenerational practice has benefits for both generations from reducing depression and improving physical wellness in older generations to supporting social, emotional and language development in young children.

== Awards ==
In 2022 G8 Education was named Australia's Most Attractive Employer by Randstad Employer Brand Survey. The survey, covering the 75 largest employers in Australia, looked at work-life balance, salary and benefits, job security, job training and work atmosphere.

In 2022 G8 Education was awarded a bronze medal in the apprenticeships-employer award category at the 2022 Australian Training Awards, as well as Large Employer of the year finalist at the Victorian Training Awards.

In 2022, G8 Education won the Queensland Child Protection Week Child Safe Organisation Award for demonstrated commitment to the ongoing journey of creating a child-focused culture that keeps children safe and well (in line with the National Principles for Child Safe Organisations).

== Controversies ==
In December 2020 G8 Education became embroiled in a staff underpayment issue. It self-reported to regulators that it had underpaid up to 27,000 employees between A$50 million and A$80 million. It said it had the funds to make restitution but the issue saw it shares slump on the ASX. In 2020, following the self-reported matter, G8 Education undertook a remediation program to ensure all affected current and former team members were paid in full. As at 31 December 2022, A$37 million remains outstanding to be paid to current and former team members.

In February 2021 G8 Education announced it was raising fees by 4.5 per cent as it recovered from the effects of the COVID-19 pandemic and restore occupancy levels which had dropped during the economic downturn.
