= Pallet (shelter) =

Seattle-based social purpose corporation

- Type: Private public benefit corporation
- Industry: Housing
- Founded: 2016; 10 years ago
- Defunct: September 2026; 0 months ago
- Fate: Closed
- Headquarters: Washington, US
- Products: Emergency shelters
- Website: https://palletshelter.com/

Pallet, established in 2016 and based in Everett, Washington, was a public benefit corporation focused on addressing unsheltered homelessness and improving employment opportunities. The company designed and manufactured rapid deployment shelters aimed at transitional housing to facilitate the move from homelessness to permanent living situations. These shelters prioritize privacy and security with features such as lockable doors and on-site bathroom facilities. Designed for quick assembly, each unit can be set up within an hour. Pallet also extends its efforts to provide emergency housing solutions and assist communities in disaster situations.

As a fair chance employer, Pallet hires individuals who have experienced homelessness, substance use disorders, or involvement with the criminal justice system, offering them stable employment opportunities.

In September 2026, Pallet announced that the company would be shutting down its operations.

== Uses ==
Pallet shelters have been deployed in transitional and supportive housing programs, aiding homeless individuals, including those recovering from surgery or illness. These shelter communities have provided assistance to diverse groups, such as veterans, formerly incarcerated individuals, indigenous populations, and those requiring pet-friendly accommodations.

A village consisting of individual shelters along with support buildings can be constructed within weeks. Separate buildings can be utilized to provide services such as food provision, case management, security, and rehabilitation, depending on the needs of the community.

As of 2022, Pallet's modular homes have been established in approximately 100 communities across states such as California, Minnesota, Hawaii, New Jersey, Vermont, and Washington. Reports from some agencies indicate that up to half of the residents have moved on to secure permanent housing.

== Shelter types ==
Pallet shelters are constructed from aluminum and composite panels, chosen for their ease of cleaning and assembly. These shelters are intended to quickly provide for the needs of unsheltered populations, offering a combination of housing and access to social services, including food, showers, and laundry facilities, aiming to facilitate the transition to permanent housing. Additionally, Pallet structures are utilized to support disaster survivors by rapidly providing housing and necessary resources.

The design of Pallet shelters allows for installation on various surfaces and connections to multiple power sources as well as standard sewer service lines. The shelters are available in different sizes and configurations:

- Shelter 64: A compact shelter designed for one or two occupants, featuring options for climate control and a locking door.
- Shelter 100: A 100 square-foot shelter that can house up to four individuals or be used as an office for village services, equipped with a smoke detector, climate control, and a lockable door.
- Community 400 & 800: Larger structures intended for communal activities such as meals, meetings, and social gatherings.
- Two-Stall Hygiene: A variation of the Shelter 100, offering two rooms each with a flushable toilet, sink, and shower, designed for privacy and ease of maintenance.
- Accessible Hygiene & Half Bath: Provides the same amenities as the standard hygiene unit with an additional half bath for accessibility.
- Laundry: Adapted from the Shelter 100 design, this unit includes facilities for laundry with space for four washers and dryers, plus additional features for convenience

Pallet employs a workforce with lived experience, utilizing aerospace construction techniques and materials. They feature custom-engineered panels to withstand significant environmental stresses, including high wind speeds and snow loads, and insulation in a lightweight form, available in different thicknesses for energy efficiency and ease of maintenance.

Each shelter is subject to inspection by local authorities to ensure compliance with industry standards and is equipped with safety features such as smoke/carbon monoxide detectors and ample electrical outlets. An on-site service provider is tasked with ensuring the safety of residents.

== Dignity Standards ==
In 2022, Pallet introduced its Dignity Standards, partnering with site operators, municipalities, and government agencies. These standards are for communities to have the necessary support services to assist individuals in moving beyond homelessness. Essential services covered by the standards include hygiene facilities, meals, transportation, and safety measures, establishing a thorough support network for residents.

The formulation of these standards draws upon Pallet's experience in creating nearly 100 shelter communities nationwide, contributions from employees who have personally faced homelessness, and feedback from site operators and residents. Although these standards have been part of Pallet's agreements with local authorities, their official declaration was made in 2022.
