= Limited cooperative association =

U.S. type of for-profit cooperative

In business, and only in United States corporate law, a limited cooperative association (LCA) is a type of for-profit cooperative which is chartered to allow for outside investment by non-owner members. LCAs combine cooperative principles with elements of partnership and limited liability company principles, and are recognized in several U.S. states. It is a form of multi-stakeholder cooperative.

== Aspects ==
A key difference between most cooperatives and an LCA is the latter's recognition of two classes of members: patron members (limited to consumers, workers, producers or others who make use of the cooperative's services and receive membership, as is the case in most traditional cooperatives) and investor members (those who are required to make a contribution to the LCA but are either not permitted or not required by the articles of organization or bylaws to conduct patronage with the LCA).

Another is the minority involvement of investor members in the decision-making process as well as in profits and loss. Under most statutes, investor members may participate in decision making, but patron members must remain the majority of the total voting power in the LCA, and the majority of the board of directors of the LCA must be elected by patron members. In addition, certain decisions require an affirmative vote by a majority of voting patron members in an LCA, such as amendments to articles or bylaws, dissolution, disposition of assets, conversion, or merger of the LCA.

Finally, while LCAs are typically taxed like other for-profit cooperatives under subchapter T of the Internal Revenue Code, an LCA may elect for subchapter K tax status, also known as partnership taxation, in which the LCA is not taxed at the federal level and instead passes income, losses and taxation through to the members. However, subchapter K may be more difficult due to limitations on unallocated reserves, and self-employment taxes.

== Legislation by state ==
The LCA was first promoted under the Wyoming Processing Cooperative Law in 2001 to allow joint ownership by farmers and investors and aid the formation and development of farm producer-owned ventures. Similar legislation was passed in multiple states, with many states adopting the Uniform Limited Cooperative Association Act (ULCAA), which was drafted by the Uniform Law Commission in 2007.

State	Date passed	Date in effect	Legislation
Colorado	May 23, 2011	April 2, 2012	SB 191
Iowa	May 20, 2005	January 1, 2006	HF 859
Kentucky	April 23, 2012	April 23, 2012	HB 441
Maryland	April 22, 2025	October 1, 2026	SB 0144
Minnesota	May 25, 2003	August 1, 2003	HF 0984
Nebraska	May 16, 2007	January 1, 2008	LB 368
Oklahoma	March 20, 2009	March 20, 2009	HB 2148
Tennessee	March 20, 2004	January 1, 2005	SB 1161/HB 1675
Utah	March 18, 2008	March 18, 2008	SB 69
Vermont	April 20, 2011	April 20, 2011	HB 21
Washington	April 17, 2019	April 28, 2019	SB 5002
Washington, D.C.	February 27, 2011	July 2, 2011	Bill No. 18-500
Wisconsin	May 23, 2006	June 5, 2006	AB 1186
Wyoming	March 1, 2001	July 1, 2001	HB 0021

=== Limited worker cooperative association ===
The Illinois General Assembly passed a bill allowing for the creation of limited worker cooperative associations (LCWA), which is a form of LCA which limits patron membership to employees. Similar legislation has been filed in other states.

State	Date passed	Date in effect	Legislation
Illinois	August 9, 2019	January 1, 2020	805 ILCS 317/21

== Criticism ==
In the magazine Cooperative Grocer, writer Laddie Luschin cautioned against this approach as fundamentally against what coops stand for, even going so far as to label it a "trojan horse" that allows for "coop washing".

== See also ==
- Low-profit limited liability company
- Employee stock ownership plan
