= A Better World =

A Better World may refer to:

- A Better World (organization), charitable organization based in Lacombe, Alberta, Canada
- A Better World (album), 2016 album by Chris de Burgh
- A Better World, 2014 novel by Marcus Sakey
- In a Better World, drama thriller film written by Anders Thomas Jensen

== See also ==
- Better World (disambiguation)
