= Community interest company =

UK company using their profits and assets for the public good

A community interest company (CIC, pronounced "see-eye-see", or colloquially, "kick") (Note: Welsh: Cwmni buddiant cymunedol, CBC) is a form of social enterprise in the United Kingdom intended "for people wishing to establish businesses which trade with a social purpose..., or to carry on other activities for the benefit of the community".

CICs were introduced by the UK government in 2005 under Part 2 of the Companies (Audit, Investigations and Community Enterprise) Act 2004. They enjoy the flexibility and certainty of the company form, but with statutory provisions to ensure they are working for the benefit of the community. The Regulator of Community Interest Companies provides oversight, which is intended to be "light touch".

CICs have proved popular, with some 10,000 registered in the first ten years of the status being available. CICs tackle a wide range of social and environmental issues and operate in all parts of the economy. By using business methods to achieve public good, it is believed that CICs have a distinct and valuable role to play in helping create a strong, sustainable and socially inclusive economy.

== History ==
Limited companies that do not have charitable status find it difficult to ensure that their assets are dedicated to public benefit. Before the CIC regime was introduced there was no simple, clear way of locking the support of such a company to a public benefit purpose, other than applying for charitable status.

The community interest company emerged from many sources, often citing the absence in the UK of a company form for not-for-profit social enterprises similar to those in other countries. A first significant proposal for a new company form in the UK was advanced in 2001 in "The case for the Public Interest Company", by Paul Corrigan, Jane Steele and Greg Parston of the Public Management Foundation. This proposal was based on research funded by the Gulbenkian Foundation, Gordon Roddick, and the Office for Public Management, and was influenced by the example of the American public benefit corporation. Stephen Lloyd of Bates Wells Braithwaite is also credited with having conceived of the idea of the "Community Interest Company" and led much of the work on establishment of that legal company form in the UK.

== Characteristics ==
CICs are diverse. They include social and community enterprises, social firms, mutual organizations such as co-operatives, and large-scale organizations operating locally, regionally, nationally, or internationally.

In order for a company to be registered as a CIC, the Regulator must be satisfied that "a reasonable person might consider that its activities are being carried on for the benefit of the community", or at least a section of the community. This community interest test is met primarily by including a suitable objects clause in the articles of association.

In order to meet this test, CICs cannot:

- be primarily focused on political activity
- be set up to serve an unduly restrictive group
- be a political party, a political campaigning organisation or a subsidiary of a political party
- be a charity
- carry out unlawful activities.

The articles of a CIC must also provide that its assets cannot be used except for the benefit of the community. This is known as the 'asset lock'.

=== The asset lock ===
The "asset lock" refers to provisions in the company's articles that ensure the assets of the company are, at least mainly, applied for the benefit of the community. The precise terms are specified in legislation. Assets not applied directly for the benefit of the community may only be exchanged for full value or transferred to another "asset-locked body". The only exceptions are distributions to the company's members for the purpose of returning paid-up capital, or paying dividends and interest (which are subject to caps).

=== Comparison with charities ===
A CIC is ipso facto not a charity, even if in all other respects it meets the requirements of charitable status. They are more lightly regulated than charities, which can be advantageous. On the other hand they do not have the benefit of charitable status, such as a favourable tax treatment: CICs are liable to corporation tax like any other company.

Those who may want to set up a CIC are expected to be philanthropic entrepreneurs who want to do good in a form other than charity. This may be because:

- CICs are identified explicitly with social enterprise. Some organizations may feel that this is more suitable than charitable status.
- Members of the board of a charity may only be paid where the constitution contains such a power, and it can be considered to be in the best interests of the charity. It means that, in general, the founder of a social enterprise who wishes to be paid cannot be on the board and must give up strategic control of the organization to a volunteer board, which is often unacceptable. This limitation does not apply to CICs.
- They are looking to work for community benefit with the relative freedom of the non-charitable company form to identify and adapt to circumstances, but with a clear assurance of not-for-profit distribution status.
- The definition of community interest that applies to CICs is wider than the public interest test for charity.

A charity can convert to a CIC with the consent of the Charity Commission. In so doing, it will lose its charitable status, including tax advantages. A charity may own a CIC as a subsidiary, in which case (exceptionally) there are no restrictions on distributions to the shareholder.

== Formation and registration ==
CICs are limited companies, either limited by shares or limited by guarantee. Thus Registered Societies and unincorporated associations cannot be CICs.

When a CIC is requested, the CIC regulator considers whether the application meets the criteria to become a CIC. If satisfied, the regulator advises the Registrar in Companies House who, provided that all the documents are in order, will issue a certificate of incorporation as a CIC.

CICs must file a "community interest company report" (form CIC34) as part of their annual submission to Companies House. This includes confirmation of directors' remuneration and some explanation of their social impact or evidence of the social benefit that they have provided over the last financial year.

A CIC is expected, though not absolutely required, to specify an "asset-locked body" in its articles of association, to which any surplus assets will be transferred when the company is wound up. If such a body is not specified, the Regulator's approval must be obtained before any distribution can be made.

Formation and registration are similar to those of any limited company. New organizations can register by filing the Form IN01 and memorandum and articles of association together with a Form CIC36 signed by all their directors, explaining their community credentials, to the Registrar of Companies for England and Wales, or the Registrar for Scotland, with a fee of £35. Since 11 March 2019, CICs can be registered online for a reduced fee of £27.

Existing companies can convert to a CIC by passing resolutions which make changes to their name and their memorandum and articles of association and by delivering to the Registrar of Companies copies of these documents, together with a fee of £35, and a form CIC37 (which is similar to a CIC36, but asks for confirmation that the company is not a charity or that permission has been obtained from the Charity Commission to convert from a charity to a CIC). The Registrar will conduct the normal checks for registration and pass the papers to the Regulator of Community Interest Companies, to determine whether the company satisfies the community interest test.

== Regulator ==
The 2004 act created the officer known as the Regulator of Community Interest Companies, who is appointed for a term of up to five years by the relevant Secretary of State – from 2016 to 2023 the Secretary of State for Business, Energy and Industrial Strategy, since 2023 the Secretary of State for Business and Trade.

Louise Smyth was appointed as Regulator in September 2020; she is also (since 2017) Chief Executive and Registrar for England and Wales at Companies House.

== See also ==
- B Corporation (certification) – a global initiative
- Community contribution company in Canada
- L3C – a similar type of legal structure in the United States
- Benefit corporation in the United States
- Social entrepreneurship
