= Carrot Rewards =

Carrot Insights

- Company type: Private
- Founded: 2015 (company); March 2016 (app)
- Headquarters: Toronto, Ontario
- Area served: Ontario, British Columbia, Newfoundland and Labrador, Northwest Territories
- Key people: Andreas Souvaliotis (Founder & CEO); Jeff Irwin (President)
- Website: carrotinsights.com
- Current status: Defunct
- Native clients on: iOS, Android, watchOS

Carrot Rewards was a mobile app for residents of three Canadian provinces and one territory, allowing users to complete health questionnaires and track steps in exchange for rewards points. The app was developed by Toronto-based Carrot Insights, a certified B corporation founded in 2015. The app was first launched in British Columbia during March 2016, followed by Newfoundland and Labrador during June 2016, Ontario during February 2017, and the Northwest Territories only weeks before the app discontinued service in June 2019. Users could choose during sign-up whether they want Aeroplan, Scene, Petro-Points, More Rewards or Drop rewards points. RBC Rewards was also added as an option in June 2018. Survey points were paid for by the organization which created the survey and step points were paid for by the provincial government where the user lives. Carrot Rewards had also partnered with Heart & Stroke, Diabetes Canada and YMCA Canada. The app was later expanded to include questionnaires and surveys on energy conservation and financial literacy. In November 2018, an optional paid tier was added to the Carrot app, allowing users to receive bonus points for completing their goals. Carrot shut down on June 19, 2019, after their "funds eventually ran out and [they] could no longer be in business". However, in December 2019, social media accounts were updated with statuses saying “stay tuned”. In January 2020, Optimity bought Carrot Rewards and relaunched the health app under a new model.

== Criticism ==
Sylvia Jones, a Member of Provincial Parliament in Ontario criticized Carrot Insights for advertising a service to check credit scores in the app which was powered by Equifax Canada, leading to customer personal information being breached in the Equifax data breach. Carrot Insights responded by stating that funds provided by the Ontario government were only used to pay for step tracking rewards points.
