= Tristan Louis =

French-born American author, entrepreneur and internet activist

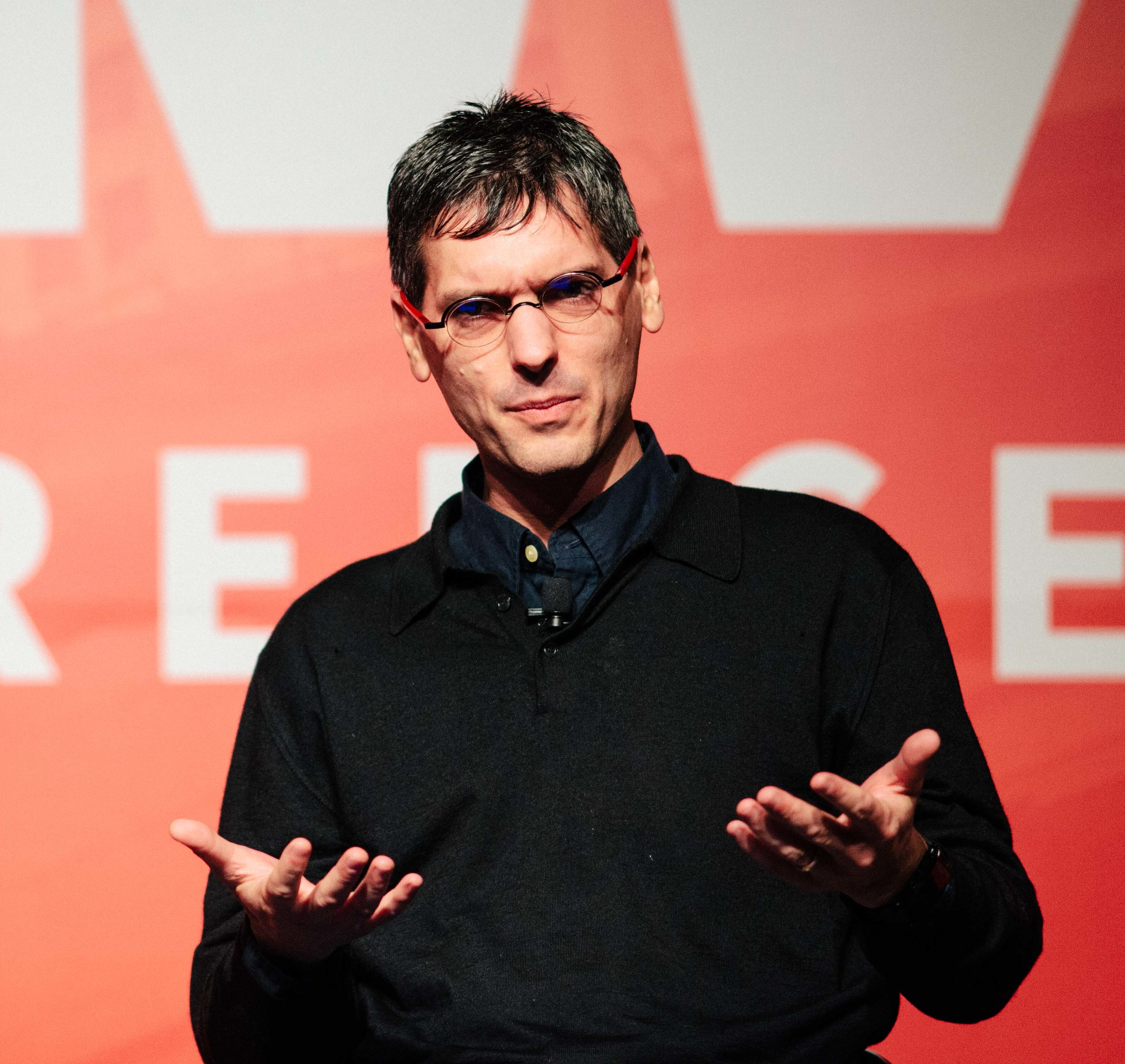
- Tristan Louis, 2014
- Born: February 28, 1971 (age 55); Digne-les-Bains, France
- Occupation: Technology entrepreneur

Tristan Louis (born February 28, 1971) is a French-born American author, entrepreneur and internet activist.

== Early work ==
Louis was born in Digne-les-Bains, Alpes-de-Haute-Provence. In 1994 and 1995, as publisher of iWorld (later renamed internet.com), part of the Mecklermedia group of Internet online media companies, he first became involved in online politics on Usenet, particularly the newsgroup alt.internet.media-coverage, during debate over the Communications Decency Act and activism against it. In a joint effort with the EFF and the Voters Telecommunications Watch, iWorld and Mecklermedia publicly endorsed a national day of protest; turning the background of web pages around the world to black. The protest received national news coverage and was a catalyst in the planning for a lawsuit (Reno v. American Civil Liberties Union) which went to the United States Supreme Court and reaffirmed First Amendment protection for Internet publishers.

After leaving iWorld, Louis contributed to many publications as a freelance writer, including a popular line of introductions to the internet, and helped co-found several start-ups, including Earthweb and Net Quotient, a consulting group. At Earthweb, Louis reprised his role of editor, hoping to reproduce the early success of iWorld and helping launch the company on the stock market.

From 1999 to early 2000, Louis joined the short-lived dot-com Boo.com; when the company failed, he wrote a detailed analysis of the challenges the company had faced; offering some context in terms of running large scale websites, which was circulated widely.

In January 2006, Louis participated in Microsoft Search Champs v4 in Seattle.

In 2011, Louis returned to startups, launching Keepskor, a branded app company which was acquired in 2014.

Since 2017, Louis serves as president and CEO of Casebook PBC, an organization focused on building a SaaS platform for social services.

== Wall Street career ==
Throughout the 2000s, Louis worked in several roles on Wall Street, most notably as Global Chief Innovation Officer for HSBC, where he was instrumental to developing several large scale internet offerings and provided the company with thought leadership in the technology innovation arena and Global Head of Mobile and Internet at Deutsche Bank. This led him to work on effort as varied as internet-only banking, transaction banking system, credit card clearing systems, and micro-transaction offerings. Louis has been credited with improving relationships between the video-game and banking industry by helping video-game companies understand the need for the kind of strong authentication, fraud-monitoring, and payment solutions that only large multinational banks can offer. In September 2008, in a speech at the Web 2.0 conference (reprised in a different way at the World Economic Forum Annual Meeting), Louis predicted the rise of crypto-currencies (which he called "virtual currencies") long before the popularity of Bitcoin.

== Contributions to standards ==
Throughout the 1990s, Louis was involved in a number of initiatives led by the World Wide Web Consortium, including the development of an early draft standard for merging television with the web. The initiative was launched too early in the development of the web and the effort quickly died off with few people adopting the proposed standard.

In the early 2000s, Louis was involved in the development community surrounding RSS, proposing a number of amendments to the specifications of the time. The proposal included creating a date element for every item in an RSS feed and provided the theoretical framework to distribute data files over an RSS channel, anticipating what now is known as podcasting.

== Writing ==
In 1994-1995, Louis served as editor on a number of guides to the Internet. He was a principal research editor on five books authored by Michael Wolff: Net.Games, Net.Money, Net.Sports, Net.Trek, and Net.Tech. Louis also wrote articles for a wide number of technology publications including The Silicon Alley Reporter, Business 2.0, IEEE Spectrum, The New York Times, and others.

Beginning in 2000, Louis started publishing a weblog, which is noted for its dissection and research into technology trends.

In 2010, Louis became a frequent contributor to Business Insider and Forbes.

In 2011, Louis started a weekly column called "On technology". It is now carried by 135 newspapers globally.

== Notes and references ==
1. Reavy, Matthew M., 1996, Group Communication on the Internet - 1996 study
2. Falk, JD and Tristan Louis, 1993 alt.internet.media-coverage FAQ (through Internet Archive)
3. Mecklermedia Corporation, February 7, 1996 Mecklermedia Joins Protest
4. Axelrod-Contrada, Joan (2007). Reno v. ACLU: Internet Censorship. Marshall Cavendish Benchmark.
5. Mookherji, Kalyani. 50 Digital Revolutionaries of the World.
6. Krishnamurthy, Sandeep. E-commerce Management: Text and Cases. Cornell University Press.
7. Louis, Tristan, What I Learned at Boo.com
8. Chang, Emily. "Microsoft Search Champs v4". Emily Chang.
9. "Keepskor acquired".
10. "Casebook PBC Board of Directors". Casebook PBC.
11. AtNewYork Staff, April 11, 1997 Earthweb shifts gears, turns publisher
12. Louis, Tristan (October 12, 1998). "TVML List: URL Getting started". World Wide Web Consortium.
13. Gibbs, Simon. "Broadcast URLs". World Wide Web Consortium.
14. Louis, Tristan, October 13, 2003 - Suggestions for RSS 0.92
15. Louis, Tristan, September 19, 2008 - Coins to QQ
16. Wolff, Michael. Net.Games, Random House, 1995. ISBN 0-679-75592-6
17. Wolff, Michael. Net.Money, Random House, 1995. ISBN 0-679-75808-9
18. Wolff, Michael. Net.Sports, Random House, 1995. ISBN 0-679-76187-X
19. Wolff, Michael. Net.Trek, Random House, 1995. ISBN 0-679-76186-1
20. Wolff, Michael. Net.Tech, Random House, 1995. ISBN 0-517-17716-1
21. Louis, Tristan (March 1, 2008). "A Microsoft-Yahoo Merger Is About More Than Just Battling Google". IEEE Spectrum.
22. Louis, Tristan. "The Television Will Be Revolutionized". New York Times. New York, NY, USA.
23. "TNL.net Blog".
24. Louis, Tristan Bibliography
25. Tristan Louis on Business Insider
26. Tristan Louis on Forbes
