= Flexible purpose corporation =

California corporation pursuing a social benefit

A flexible purpose corporation (FPC) was a class of corporation in California lacking a profit motive when pursuing a social benefit defined in its charter. A flexible purpose corporation differed from a Benefit corporation in that it targeted for-profit entities seeking traditional capital market investment. The classification was first created in 2012 and was retired in 2015 via legislation in favor of the social purpose corporation (SPC) classification, with existing FPCs continuing their existence as SPCs.

== History ==
Flexible purpose corporations were established in California S.B 201, which was signed into law on October 9 and became effective January 1, 2012.

Formerly known as the “flexible purpose corporation”, the Social Purpose Corporation (SPC) was given a new name on January 1, 2015, to better reflect the intended purpose of this corporate form.¹ ¹ In September 2014, Governor Jerry Brown signed into law an amendment (S.B. 1301) to the Corporate Flexibility Act of 2011. This amendment renamed the “flexible purpose corporation” as the “social purpose corporation”; eliminated the waiver for the MD&A requirement; and now requires directors of SPCs to consider factors such as the overall goals of the corporation and the social purposes stated in its articles in their decision-making. S.B. 1301 took effect on January 1, 2015.

In California, "The amendment, S.B. 1301, changes existing law (found under Corporations Code Sections 2500-3503) to emphasize the social-purpose nature of the FPC, most notably by changing its name to the “Social Purpose Corporation.” S.B. 1301 takes effect on January 1, 2015. On that date, existing FPCs will automatically continue their existence as SPCs.

== See also ==
- Benefit corporation
