= Spud (online grocer) =

Canadian online grocer

Sustainable Produce Urban Delivery Inc.
- A delivery from Sustainable Produce Urban Delivery (SPUD)
- Trade name: Spud
- Formerly: Freshlocal Solutions Inc. SPUD.ca; Small Potatoes Urban Delivery
- Type: Private, Certified B Corporation
- Industry: Retail (Grocery)
- Founded: Vancouver, British Columbia (1997)
- Founder: David van Seters
- Area served: Vancouver, Victoria, Calgary, Edmonton
- Number of employees: ~900 (2017)
- Website: www.spud.ca

Sustainable Produce Urban Delivery Inc., doing business as Spud, is a Canadian online grocer and store operator based in Vancouver, specializing in the sale of organic groceries. The company was founded as Small Potatoes Urban Delivery in 1997.

== History ==
Small Potatoes Urban Delivery was founded in 1997 by David van Seters, providing delivery of organic produce to the homes of online customers. Operations expanded to Victoria in 2003, and Calgary, Seattle and Portland in 2005. The company began a series of acquisitions in the United States, purchasing Organic Express and Westside Organics—with operations in San Francisco and Los Angeles—and Seattle-based competitor Pioneer Organics in 2008.

Peter van Stolk, founder of Jones Soda, purchased the company in 2010. The meaning of the acronym 'SPUD' was changed to Sustainable Produce Urban Delivery, and the company's further geographic expansion was halted.

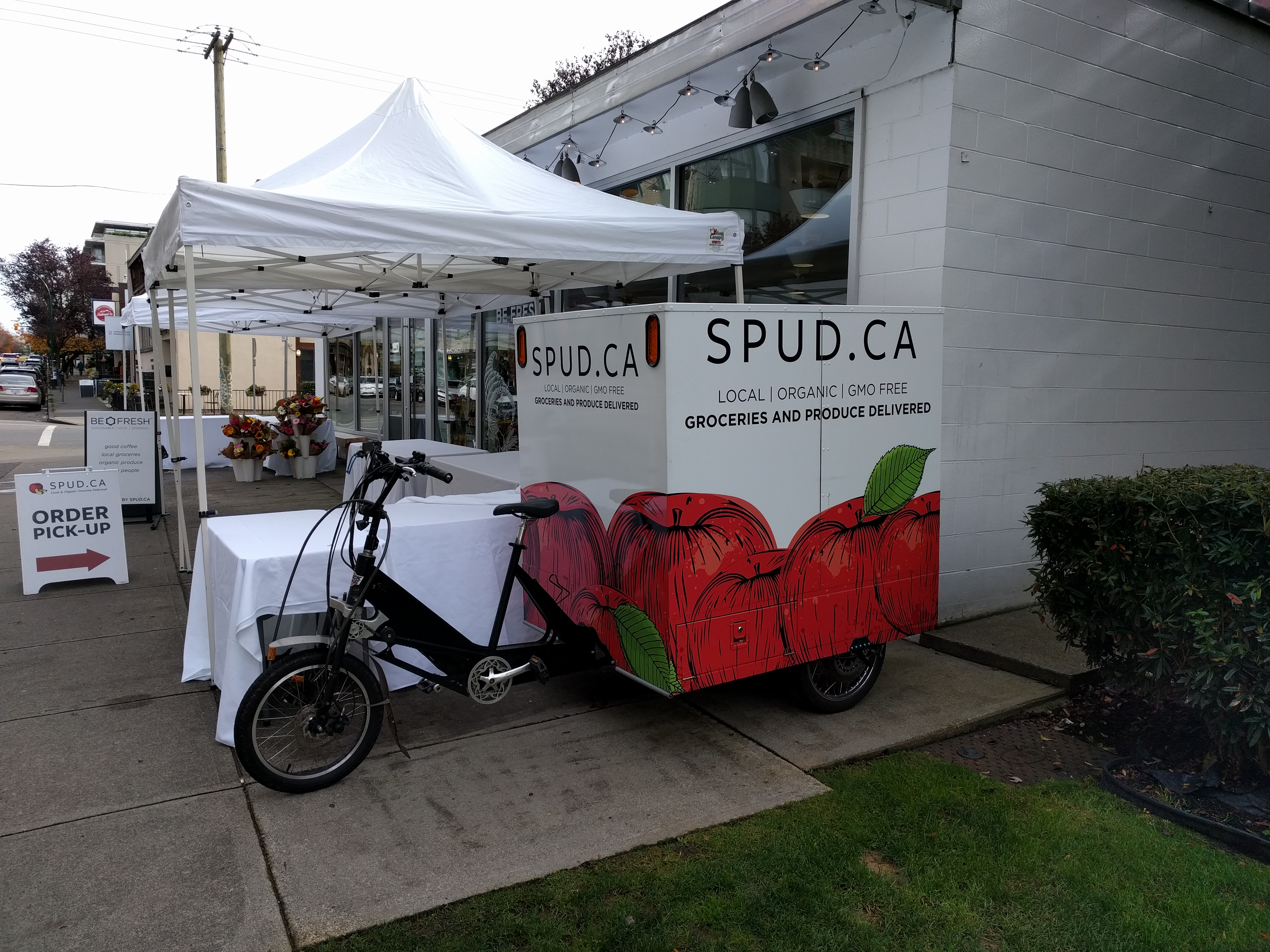
Be Fresh Local Market, located at 1900 West 1st Ave in Vancouver

In August 2015 Spud opened its first brick and mortar store and café, Be Fresh Local Market, in the Kitsilano neighbourhood of Vancouver. The stores are located in urban areas and carry a limited amount of products, in addition to ready-made meals. The stores also serve as an order pick-up point for online orders. Blush Lane Organic Market, a small grocery store chain in Alberta, was acquired in 2017.

Spud expanded into wholesaling with a subsidiary named Food-X in 2018. It operated the back-end operations, warehousing, and fulfillment of grocery items on behalf of partner retailers. Food-X operated a 74,000-square-foot warehouse in Burnaby to fulfill orders to Metro Vancouver residents. In February 2018, Walmart announced that Food-X would handle their e-commerce grocery platform in Vancouver.

In April 2021 the company underwent a corporate restructuring, acquiring Rainy Hollow Ventures in a reverse takeover; the combined entity was renamed Freshlocal Solutions Inc. and began trading publicly on the TSX. In September 2021 Freshlocal's executive leadership changed, and in May 2022 it filed for creditor protection under the Companies' Creditors Arrangement Act. The operations of its Food-X subsidiary were wound down.

After the period of creditor protection the company was purchased by Third Eye Capital, the debtor-in-possession lender. It has since changed its name back to Sustainable Produce Urban Delivery and rebranded in 2023 as 'Spud'.

== Current operations ==
Spud continues to operate online shopping and home delivery services in Vancouver, Victoria, Calgary and Edmonton, with a Be Fresh Market location in Vancouver, three Blush Lane Organic Market locations in Calgary and one Edmonton.
