= Socially responsible business =

A socially responsible business (SRB) is a generally for-profit venture that seeks to leverage business for a more just and sustainable world. The objective of the SRBs involves more than just maximizing profits for the shareholders; it is also about creating positive changes and making valuable contributions to the stakeholders such as the local community, customers, and staff. In other words, the SRB is both profit-oriented and socially responsible as these companies seek to make financial gains, and at the same time, aim to improve the well-being of the community. In doing so, the businesses engage in the voluntary initiatives with the aims of improving in various areas ranging from the social to environmental aspects of the society.

The concept of SRB is considered to be the highest level of involvement between the company and the community in which it operates. It holds a similar concept to Corporate Social Responsibility (CSR) in terms of having a common goal to make positive contributions, minimizing harmful effects, and being a force for good in society. The main difference is that the SRB goes beyond these activities and ultimately aims to create a market space for itself. It can be achieved through forming partnerships and alliances with the local community and collaborating with groups such as non-governmental NGOs. The SRB prioritizes a socially responsible activity and demands to create a long-term relationship with their community.

== Approaches ==
Since the SRB greatly requires collaboration between business sector and the local community, it is therefore crucial for the businesses to be socially aware of the local customs, culture and specific details of that environment. Here are the examples of three approaches in implementing the concept of SRB, which would help in forming a partnership between the business and not-for-profit sector.

- 1. Gathering background and on-the-ground information

It is essential for the businesses to access information to be able to understand the social norms, culture, rules and business practices of that particular environment. This can be done through searching on the Web sites such as BBC News and The Economist. Moreover, in order to gain an insight into the local areas, accessing information and analysis from the organizations such as UN department and non-governmental (NGO) is also of importance as these organizations can provide representatives and local contacts as well as highlight the areas of assistance needed at the site.

- 2. Finding an organization to form a partnership

This approach is focused on forming a relationship and working with the business partners to exchange ideas and develop a socially responsible project in the local community.

- 3. Developing scenarios

After collecting necessary information, creating scenarios is a way of identifying the chances and alternatives to see the potential of the business's decisions. This is a process where the analysis of the local community is used to discover the strengths, weaknesses, opportunities, and threats. These data then will be used as a guideline to predict the viability and practicality of the business plans.

== Environmental sphere ==
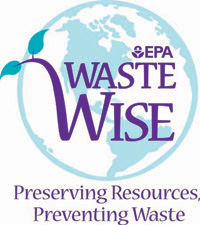
U.S. Environmental Protection Agency's waste reduction program

Environmentally, the SRB integrates the activities such as protecting the environment by reducing waste and using natural resources in an effective and sustainable way.

The partnership between Motorola and the Environmental Protection Agency (EPA) is one example that demonstrates the socially responsible practices. Motorola, a US multinational telecommunications corporation, has been voluntarily participating in the EPA WasteWise project.

The WasteWise project is divided into three main areas: waste reduction, recycling, and manufacturing recycled products. In regards to waste reduction, for example, Motorola has illustrated a clear set of objectives, stating that the company's goal is to reduce waste by 10% by 2016, compared with 2011 numbers. Along with that, there are also other objectives and statistics such as year-over-year-change to show the process. As a result, Motorola has contributed to the society in a positive and significant way. For instance, the company is reported to have successfully recycled more than 80 percent of waste across different sites.

== Social sphere ==
The Body Shop, a global cosmetics and beauty brand, is known for its involvement in advocacy. The Body Shop has been collaborating with various organizations such as ECPAT and NGOs to combat challenging social issues.

For example, the Body Shop participates in the ECPAT's three year campaign to support the movement against child prostitution, trafficking of children and young people. This campaign has been influential across many countries. Due to the company's global presence in over 60 markets, the company itself has been a major force in raising awareness of human trafficking issues worldwide. The statistics has shown that there are 7,044,278 people signed campaign petitions. In addition to this support, the campaign has attracted government sector support from 16 different countries to bring changes on its legislation.

== SRB practices in small and medium-sized enterprises (SMEs) ==
There have been a growing number of customers who prefer to consume goods that are being produced in a socially responsible way. With this growing concern of the environment and resources in mind, many businesses whether large corporations or small and medium-sized enterprises (SMEs) pay special attention to the business activities and therefore adopt various socially responsible business practices.

Due to the lack of resources and the business size of the SMEs, these enterprises approach in a socially responsible manner by creating values and positive contributions towards employees, customers, and local community. The good practices may include the following: maintaining a good working condition, creating a healthy relationship with the stakeholders and providing accurate and honest information about the products or services. Through these SMEs practices, there are potential business benefits on employees, customers, society, and business performances.

Hundreds of SMEs have signed up to become B Corporation (certification) and their Impact Assessment model allows for diverse companies to both compete to become companies which are better for people, community and the planet.

=== Benefits ===
- Employees: Treating the employees well in areas such as the flexibility of working hours and the provisions of social benefits can enhance a good working environment, increase employee satisfaction and motivation at the organization.
- Customers: Customer satisfaction can be achieved through properly dealing with complaints and providing quality products at a reasonable price.
- Society: Participating in a voluntary initiative and engaging in the community development schemes can benefit the SMEs in terms of brand image and reputation.

== Innovation ==
Innovation is a crucial element in performing, expediting, and facilitating business practices. Embracing innovation in the business process can bring many advantages and further lead to business growth and success.

In relation to SRB, the ability to think creatively and implement innovative changes is essential. The SRB needs to enhance an innovative thinking to create efficiency internally and support social causes and the development of community positively. One of the concepts of innovative thinking is ‘open innovation’. Open innovation is defined as the accumulation of internal and external ideas and knowledge as a means to expand and advance the businesses into the competitive market. There are three key processes of open innovation.

=== Outside-in process ===
Businesses collect and take account of external knowledge from the stakeholders.

=== Inside-out process ===
Enterprises share ideas into the market. If it is applicable to any other businesses, businesses can sell the ideas and licenses to make profit.

=== Coupled process ===
This process requires collaborations from different sectors that are interested and related to the activities to develop a relationship and form a partnership with other organizations.

Among the three processes, coupled process is likely to be the most relevant to the socially responsible business. This process allows the enterprise to create a strategic network with the local community. This then creates an integration, leading to an innovative co-thinking. Overall, with the combination of business's expertise and the insightful knowledge of the local community, these elements can initiate changes toward a more sustainable and innovative business practice.

== Maintenance and process ==
Becoming a socially responsible business is a process that requires continual interaction and maintenance among the businesses and their stakeholders. Maintenance starts after the socially responsible practice is adopted, and its purpose is to maintain the relationships and implement various methods to sustain a socially responsible practice in the organization. A socially responsible maintenance framework demonstrates three levels of environment: Institutional environment (societal level), Organizational identity (organizational level), and Champions’ tactics (individual level), analyzing factors such as the characteristics of the business, environments and social expectations.

=== Institutional environment ===
An institutional environment encompasses three types: weak, strong, and heterogeneous. These types explain a different societal level of expectations, concerning the conditions and characteristics a socially responsible business must conform to. In regards to weak institutional environment, the businesses operate in a flexible atmosphere, which allows the business to have more opportunities in decision-making and without being constrained by external guidance. A strong institutional environment, on the contrary, is when the businesses are expected to adhere to certain standards or structures in order to sustain a quality of the maintenance. Lastly, a heterogeneous institutional environment refers to varied expectations from different sectors, and the maintenance must be conducted in a way that balances the viewpoints of different parties. To determine the environment whether it is strong, weak, or heterogeneous, the businesses can make its assessment by observing the patterns of thinking and behavior of the stakeholders.

=== Organizational identity ===
Organizational identity is mainly about the certain traits that define characteristics of the organization. The decisions of whether the socially business practice should be continued or not can be determined by analyzing the consistency and balance between organizational identity and its practice. Therefore, an organizational identity can be changed so that it is relevant to and congruous with its core missions and business social activities.

=== Champions’ tactics ===
This framework describes the ‘champion’ as a person who applies the relevant skills such as persuasion and persistence as ‘tactics’ to make changes and influence others. Thus, the maintenance of certain social practices can be adjustable and changeable, depending on this particular individual.

=== Cross-level framework of socially responsible practice maintenance ===
These three frameworks are related with one another. It is called a cross-level framework of socially responsible practice maintenance. As such, it can help in evaluating which approach (Organizational identity or Champions’ Tactics) can be more effective in the maintenance of the practice when the following conditions of weak, strong, and heterogeneous institutional environment is present.

In this cross-level framework, it has been proposed that:

- When a weak institutional environment is present, organizational identity will be more effective in ensuring maintenance.

The first proposition illustrates that organizational identity will be more effective in ensuring maintenance in a weak institutional environment because there are fewer regulations for a company to conform with. The environment allows the company to apply its own way of solving the problem with more freedom and flexibility. This is where the connection between society and a company's value is created. Socially business responsible practice is integrated into its mission and therefore becomes an area of expectation that has to be met and succeeded.

- When either a strong institutional environment or a heterogeneous institutional is present, champions' tactic will be more effective in ensuring maintenance.

On the other hand, the second proposition demonstrates that champions’ tactics will be more effective in strong and heterogeneous institutional environment. There are certain rules and viewpoints expected by the community in this structural environment. The champions will be more effective in this environment because the individual are able to understand, respond quickly and persuade other members to support and maintain a socially responsible practice. For instance, due to various views in the heterogeneous environment, the champions can become an important asset by making its value and practices clear to organizational members through his or her persuasiveness. Overall, this helps in directing, prioritizing and sustaining a socially responsible practice into a right direction as well as avoiding unclear goals and measures in a complex environment.

== See also ==
- Business ethics
- Conscious business
- Conscious capitalism
- Corporate governance
- Corporate social entrepreneurship
- Corporate social responsibility
- Organizational ethics
- Social responsibility
- Social Venture Network
