= FlipGive =

- Type: Privately held
- Industry: technology, corporate social responsibility, fundraising, crowdfunding, sports
- Founded: Toronto, Ontario (2015)

FlipGive is a team funding app that simplifies raising money for sports teams, schools and community groups. Teams earn cash back by buying the things they need to get anyway and are paid whenever they shop, dine out, book hotels or activities.

FlipGive has worked with Dikembe Mutombo as an investor and corporate ambassador to raise awareness of the rising costs of youth sports in North America.

== Origins ==
FlipGive was formed November 2015 as a spin-off from parent company Better The World - a corporate social responsibility agency developed by partners who attended the Executive MBA program at the Richard Ivey School of Business at the University of Western Ontario.

FlipGive is a B corporation.

== Acquisition ==
In September 2025, FlipGive was acquired by US based RaiseRight, an online fundraising platform.
