= Brew Dr. Kombucha =

American company which makes kombucha

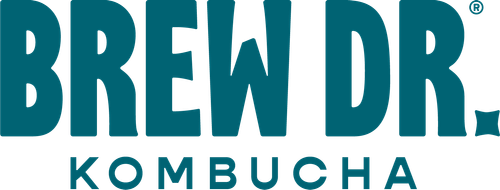
- Type: Private company
- Industry: Food and beverages
- Founded: 2008; 18 years ago
- Founder: Matt Thomas
- Headquarters: Portland, Oregon, US
- Website: brewdrkombucha.com

Brew Dr. Kombucha is an American company which makes a fermented tea beverage consisting of brewed organic whole tea leaves, dried herbs, roots, and fruits. Brew Dr. Kombucha is considered a major Kombucha drink company, and was named one of the fastest-growing companies in the U.S. The brand was founded in 2008, and is headquartered in Portland, Oregon (U.S.).

== History ==
Brew Dr. Kombucha is produced by Townshend's Tea Company. In 2008, the company became one of the first to use organic tea blends to produce the Kombucha drink. Brew Dr. Kombucha is produced in-house, and uses probiotic fermentation process. It also uses organic tea blends (which differs from other Kombucha-based drinks). The manufacturing process involves a machine called "Spinning Cone Column", which uses atmospheric pressure to remove alcohol from liquid without heat. In December 2017, Dr. Kombucha partnered with Portland Trail Blazers to produce Rip City Happiness Kombucha.

== See also ==
- Kombucha
