= Cariuma =

Brazilian footwear brand

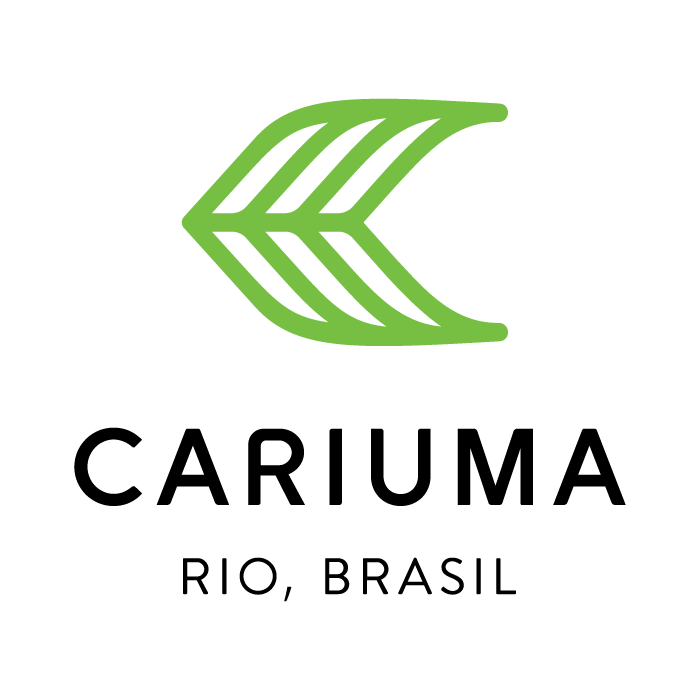

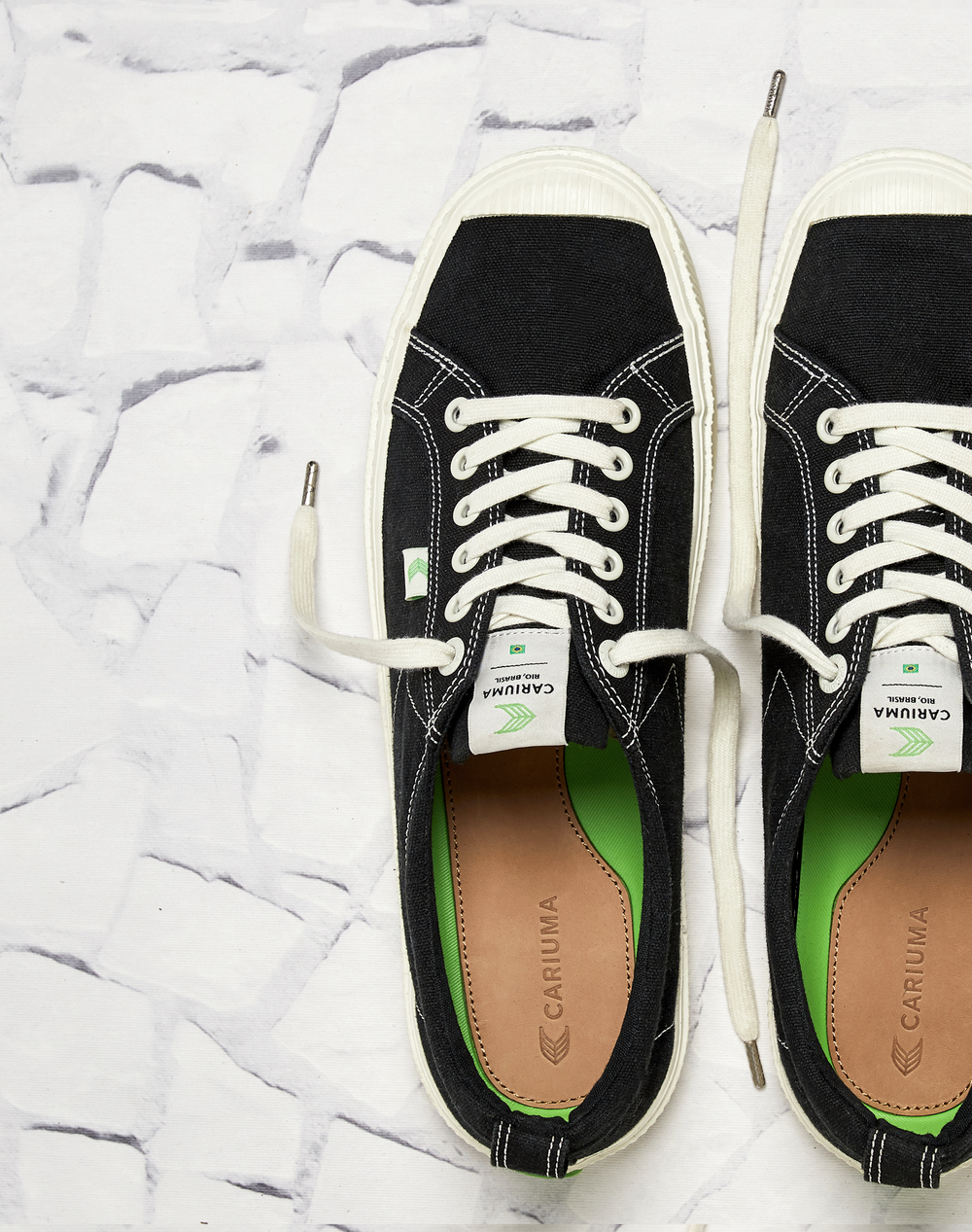
- Industry: Footwear
- Founded: 2018; 8 years ago
- Headquarters: Rio de Janeiro, Brazil
- Products: Sneakers
- Website: www.cariuma.au

Cariuma Central Pre Ltd. is a Brazilian footwear and lifestyle brand founded in 2018. The company's shoes are marketed as being produced in a sustainable manner using organic products like bamboo and cotton to make environmentally friendly footwear.

Cariuma's headquarters are in Rio De Janeiro, Brazil, but it also has a presence in Singapore. As of late 2025, the brand is now owned by the Brazilian e-commerce group ZZ MALL (ZZAB Comércio de Calçados Ltda).ZZ Mall became sole shareholder that October, and took shares by founders and venture backers. Prior to this, Cariuma raised $16.5M-$24M in funding by East Ventures, and Innova Capital.

== History ==
The company was founded in 2018 by David Python and Fernando Porto while they were at Harvard University studying for their MBA. Python was recruited by a family-run shoe company during his studies and helped run the factory, while Porto had previously started his own shoe company at 18 but went bankrupt at 23. Together, they decided to start a new shoe company using both of their knowledge and expertise.

Since late 2025, Carimua is owned by ZZ Mall. The firm acquired all 15.73 million shares of the brand. Before the acquisition, investing companies included East Ventures, Innova Capital, 4M Holding, ACTAI Ventures, EXOR Seeds, and Heliconia Capital.

== Social responsibility ==
As part of the company's core values, the founders wanted to ensure that the shoes they produced were not only sustainable for the environment but also that the company engaged in socially responsible work. Apart from using organic and vegan materials for its shoes, the company also engages in reforestation and helps plant trees in the Amazon rainforest.

== Popularity ==
The driving force of the company's growth and popularity has been in the skating scene, where its shoes have become popular among skaters. This has led the company to release skating shoes in addition to its regular sneakers.
