= Helsinki Process on Globalisation and Democracy =

The Helsinki Process on Globalization and Democracy is a joint initiative of Finland and Tanzania that resulted from the Helsinki Conference of December 2002. According to the Finnish government, "the Helsinki Process searches for novel and empowering solutions to the dilemmas of global governance. It aims to offer a forum for open and inclusive dialogue between major stakeholders".

== Background ==
The Helsinki Process is a Finnish government foreign initiative. While some countries are focused internally on how their policies can contribute to just globalisation, Finland is more oriented towards external initiatives, such as during the Cold War when Finland helped facilitate the east–west negotiations. The Helsinki Process is an attempt by Finland to encourage north–south engagement.

Through its partnership with Tanzania, Finland launched a platform where countries from the North and South can work together to mitigate the adverse impact of globalisation and manage the process equitably. This initiative serves as a forum for governments from the North and South, international organizations, private sector, civil society, and other stakeholders. By 2005, the Helsinki Process hosted a two-day conference that attracted 700 participants from 79 countries.

== Phases ==
The Helsinki Process has two phases.

The first phase of the process occurred from 2003 to September 2005. During this phase "the high-level Helsinki Group and three thematic Tracks worked on developing a concept for multi-stakeholder cooperation in global problem solving and suggested ways of addressing various global problems using this concept."

The second Phase of the process occurred from October 2005 to the end of 2007. The purpose of this phase was to:

1. Promote the implementation of selected proposals made during the first phase of the process
2. Continue multi-stakeholder dialogue for finding feasible solutions to global problems
3. Promote multi-stakeholder cooperation in institutions and mechanisms of global governance
4. Strive to achieve the aims of the Millennium Declaration and the MDGs by 2015
5. Create a framework for solving global problems beyond 2015
6. Address the democracy, coherence, and compliance deficits in global governance
