= B Lab =

U.S. non-profit organization

- Founded: 2006; 20 years ago
- Founder: Andrew Kassoy, Jay Coen Gilbert, Bart Houlahan
- Location: Philadelphia, Pennsylvania, US
- Website: bcorporation.net

B Lab is a non-profit organization that was founded in 2006 in Berwyn, Pennsylvania, by Andrew Kassoy, Jay Coen Gilbert and Bart Houlahan. B Lab created, and awards, the B corporation certification for for-profit organizations. The "B" stands for beneficial and indicates that the certified organizations voluntarily meet certain standards of transparency, accountability, sustainability, and performance, with an aim to create value for society, not just for traditional stakeholders such as the shareholders.

B Corp evaluates applicants on five criteria: governance, workers' rights, community impact, environmental impact and "stewardship of its customers". To be certified, companies must achieve a score of 80 or higher out of 200 in each category. Once a company passes the B Lab's "Impact Assessment", it must then pay an annual fee which is based on its location and gross annual revenue. The waiting list for assessment can be up to two years.

In addition to awarding B Corporation certifications, B Lab also administers the B Impact Management programs and software, and also advocates for benefit corporation statutes at the state level. (The B Corporation certification should not be confused with state-sanctioned benefit corporation status.)

In 2020, B Lab created an SDG Action Manager to help companies adopt the United Nations' Sustainable Development Goals (SDG).
