= Low-profit limited liability company =

Legal form of business entity in the US

A low-profit limited liability company (L3C) is a legal form of business entity in the United States. Commonly referred to as a hybrid structure, it has characteristics of both for-profit and non-profit entities. L3Cs were created to comply with the Internal Revenue Service (IRS) program-related investments (PRIs) rules which allow most typically private foundations the ability to maintain tax-exempt status through investments in qualifying businesses and/or charities. With a social mission as the primary objective and a secondary objective of profit generation, the L3C legal form is considered a viable option for businesses seeking a reputation or marketability as a social enterprise.

== Background and concept ==
The L3C structure was designed by Robert M. Lang, Jr., who was the CEO of a New York-based family foundation. Lang developed the structure as a way for foundations to clear tax and regulatory hurdles when it came to donations. With the first L3C statute being enacted in 2008, L3Cs are considered a relatively young legal form of business entity. In 2013, there were 711 L3Cs throughout the United States and by 2020 there were 1,700 L3Cs.

An L3C is a for-profit, social enterprise venture that has a primary goal of performing a socially beneficial purpose with a secondary goal of maximizing profits. It is a hybrid structure that combines the legal and tax flexibility of a traditional LLC, the social benefits of a non-profit organization, and the branding and market positioning advantages of a Benefit Corporation. The L3C is obligated to be mission-driven by law which gives a clear order of priorities while also aligning with Lang's initial design intention of being a structure that can take donations from foundations.

The L3C makes it easier for socially oriented businesses to attract investments from foundations and additional money from private investors. Unlike the traditional LLC, the L3C's articles of organization are required by law to mirror the federal tax standards for program-related investing. A program-related investment (PRI) is one way in which foundations can satisfy their obligation under the Tax Reform Act of 1969 to distribute at least 5% of their assets every year for charitable purposes in order to maintain their tax-exempt status. While foundations usually meet this requirement through grants, investments in L3Cs and charities that qualify as PRIs can also fulfill the requirement while allowing foundations to receive a return.

== General characteristics ==
While L3Cs are a separate legal form of business entity, L3Cs structure most closely emulates that of a limited liability company (LLC). The most notable difference between L3Cs and LLCs is that L3Cs are required to have a socially beneficial mission as their primary objective. Below are several noteworthy characteristics of L3Cs:

=== Formation ===
L3Cs are formed by filing articles of organization with the Secretary of State within a state that has L3C statute provisions. For businesses primarily operating in a state without L3C statute provision, it is possible to still legally form as an L3C by (1) incorporating in a state with an L3C statute provision, (2) registering as a foreign business doing business in that particular state, and (3) appointing a registered agent within that particular state. Within the articles of organization, the Registered Agent will be designated. Many states have an initial filing fee along with an annual fee and annual report filing requirement necessary for an L3C to maintain its legal status.

Following filing, the members of the L3C must execute a formal operating agreement. In the operating agreement, an L3C needs to define its purpose per the provisions of IRS Treasury Regs.Sec.53.4944-3(a):

1. an L3C must significantly further the accomplishment of one or more charitable purposes;
2. the production of income and appreciation of property cannot be a significant purpose of the L3C; and
3. an L3C cannot seek to accomplish any political or legislative purposes

In addition to meeting IRS Treasury Regs.Sec.53.4944-3(a), many states require the label "L3C" or "low-profit limited liability company" to appear in the name of the organization. Each state may have state-specific requirements that govern L3C formation.

=== Duration ===
The lifetime or duration of an L3C usually extends beyond the life of its members because it takes on its own legal personhood. Thus, the death or withdrawal of a member does not impact the existence of the L3C.

=== Management ===
L3C's have the option to be member-managed or manager-managed. This distinction should be made within the operating agreement of the business. The default is member-managed which means that the members of the L3C are responsible for delegating and performing the day-to-day operational functioning of the business along with determining strategic direction for the business. When an L3C is manager-managed, the members designate either members or non-members to take on managerial roles for the business and who act as agents for the organization. A manager-managed selection does not necessarily mean that members lose their voting rights on material issues regarding the business unless indicated or contracted otherwise within the operating agreement.

=== Member fiduciary duties ===
Members of an L3C are considered a fiduciary of the organization. Depending on a member's role in the organization, they may have varying fiduciary duties. Two common fiduciary duties are a duty of care and a duty of loyalty. Violations of these duties can result in a civil lawsuit and lead to compensatory damages and punitive damages. Note that some states allow for fiduciary duties to be altered within the operating agreement.

=== Member liability ===
Members of the L3C have limited liability. In other terms, member liability is limited to their capital contribution to the L3C except for member's individual torts. This means that the members are not personally responsible for the contracts, debts, and/or actions of the business. In rare circumstances, members may be held further liable under the doctrine of piercing the corporate veil. Through piercing the corporate veil, courts remove the protection of limited liability and hold members of the entity personally liable for the business's contracts, debts, and/or actions of the business.

=== Distribution of member's interest ===
While L3Cs have a primary objective of accomplishing a social mission, L3Cs can have a secondary objective of raising profit. The profits can be distributed to members similar to an LLC. This characteristic is a key defining feature between L3Cs and non-profits. The default distribution is by the percentage of ownership; however, members can contract otherwise within the operating agreement on how profits are distributed.

=== Transferability of member's interest ===
The ability for a member to transfer their interest or right to profit is often limited; however, members can contract otherwise within the operating agreement. A member's interest is separate from membership. This means that an individual can transfer their member's interest but remain a member of the L3C.

=== Federal income taxation ===
Because an L3C is a for-profit entity, it is not tax-exempt. L3Cs are taxed the same as LLCs for federal income tax purposes. This means L3Cs can elect to be taxed as a sole-proprietorship/partnership, C-Corporation, or even as an S-Corporation in some states. By default, an L3C with two or more members is taxed as a partnership while an L3C with one member is taxed as a sole proprietorship. Both of these elections are considered pass-through taxation because the profits/losses and thus taxes of a business are directly passed on to the members via their individual tax returns. When taxed as a C-Corporation, the entity will pay corporate taxes before profit is distributed to members who will also be required to pay tax on their gains. This is sometimes called double taxation. Prior to electing a taxation form, members of the L3C should consider the personal tax consequences of each election form.

=== Convertibility ===
It is possible to convert from an existing legal form of business entity to an L3C and vice versa. Tax implications and formality requirements differ between each legal form of business entity and the different obligations from state-to-state.

== Legislation ==
The creation of L3C legislation is reliant on the establishment of a state statute. To create such a statute, legislation must be passed that amends the state's general limited liability company (LLC) law. Note that a business can operate as an L3C within a state that does not have an L3C statute by incorporating in a state that does have an L3C statute and filing as a foreign firm doing business.

Vermont was the first state to pass an L3C statute in April 2008 which effectively allowed for the L3C legal form to operate in every state along with internationally. L3C statutes currently exists in: Illinois, Louisiana, Maine, Michigan, Missouri, North Dakota, Rhode Island, Utah, Vermont, Wyoming, Puerto Rico, and the federal jurisdictions of the Crow Indian Nation of Montana and the Oglala Sioux Tribe. Legislation has been written for 26 additional states but has not yet been introduced.

In May, 2012, the IRS released proposed regulations that broaden the landscape of what constitutes an acceptable PRI by adding nine new examples of investments that would qualify, along with some general principles. An amendment to the Illinois L3C law that would allow for a more expansive description of the purposes for which L3Cs can be created, consistent with the proposed examples of PRIs set forth by the IRS in 2012, unanimously passed the Illinois Senate on April 17, 2013, and has been referred to the Illinois House Rules Committee. The expanded clause would make Illinois the first state to authorize L3Cs whose purposes may reflect the whole range of statutorily sanctioned PRIs to include religious, scientific, and literary organizations. Legislation is also pending at federal level that will simplify the process for receiving IRS approval that an investment qualifies as a PRI.

Previously, North Carolina authorized L3Cs. However, as of January 1st, 2014, the state no longer recognizes the L3C legal structure. North Carolina did away with the L3C structure largely because lawmakers stated that a plain LLC can be used for the same purpose. Previously existing L3Cs incorporated in North Carolina can continue to use their designation. New entities wishing to be an L3C within North Carolina can incorporate within a state with an L3C statute while continuing to operate in North Carolina.

== Funding ==
As mentioned, the initial inspiration for the L3C form was to create a way for foundations to meet donation requirements. However, beyond foundations, L3Cs see funding and investments from a variety of sources including trusts, endowments, pension funds, individual investors, corporations, other businesses, and even government entities. To simplify the understanding of how L3C funding traditionally flows, it is beneficial to break it into three segments.

- Segment I: Investment from foundations for PRI
  - The IRS mandates that foundations direct 5% of their annual funds to charitable or educational purposes to keep their tax-exempt status. Traditionally this is achieved via grants to non-profit organizations; however, program-related investments (PRIs) serve as an alternative option and can be preferred as it creates the potential for a return on investment.
  - A PRI can be made to either a for-profit or non-profit entity. It can be performed as a loan, loan guarantee, equity purchase, or another investment form so long as it achieves a charitable purchase.
  - By definition, L3Cs must outline in their operating agreements how they will meet the provisions of IRS Treasury Regs.Sec.53.4944-3(a) which indicates the requirements for PRIs. However, because the IRS has not determined that all L3Cs have met PRI requirements, firms can receive a Private Letter Ruling (PLR) from the IRS to verify their status as qualified PRI recipients. Receiving a PLR is a costly and time-consuming endeavor.
  - However, receiving a PLR often opens up L3Cs to more PRI funding.
- Segment II: Investment from corporations, businesses, and individuals
  - In addition to funding from PRIs, L3Cs may see funding come from corporations, businesses, and individuals. These parties are often seeking a higher return on investment than PRIs.
  - Similar to PRIs, this funding can be received in numerous forms including loans, loan guarantees, equity purchases, or any other investment vehicle form.
  - Note that for an L3C to sell securities, it will have to follow SEC guidelines to conduct a legal and proper sale.
  - Individual investors will also likely have to achieve accredited investor status as governed by the SEC. One exception to this requirement is through the 2012 JOBS Act, Regulation D, which allows for the public to purchase equity in private companies via crowdfunding.
- Segment III: Funding from banks and financial institutions
  - The final segment for funding is through banks and financial institutions.
  - This type of financing is often done through loans which can be difficult for a new venture to receive due to a lack of credit history and limited assets that can be used as collateral. One option for receiving a loan with limited credit is to seek out a Small Business Administration (SBA) backed loan.
  - One benefit to this type of funding is that return on investment is usually set at a particular yield meaning these institutions take on risk but receive a capped return; however, in return for their risk and lack of upside reward they seek a liquidation preference.

== Pros and cons ==
Since the creation of L3Cs, there have been both proponents and opponents to this legal form of business entity. Below outlines several key arguments for both sides.

Pros
L3Cs can attract a large amount of funding from foundations and institutions that are less risk-averse than typical investors because there is limited yield expectation.
There is a simple filing process compared to other legal forms of business entities.
L3Cs are immediately recognized as brands with a socially beneficial purchase. People buy more frequently from businesses with a social mission. In 2020, 77% of consumers indicated that they are motivated to purchase from a company that is committed to "making the world a better place."
L3Cs mission may attract more employees. In 2020, 60% of employees indicated they would take a pay-cut to work at a firm that has a purpose-driven mission.
L3Cs have greater flexibility in determining the financial and non-financial rights of their owners as compared to corporations including benefit corporations.

Cons
The IRS has yet to officially confirm that all L3Cs qualify for PRIs. Thus, some foundations are hesitant to make financial commitments to L3Cs. To verify a firm can receive PRIs, L3Cs can obtain a Private Letter Ruling (PLR) from the IRS which verifies the firm's status as being an acceptable recipient of PRIs. Private Letter Rulings can take 12 to 18 months to be processed and average legal fees of over $50,000 along with a substantial IRS fee as well.
Many attorneys and lawmakers argue that L3Cs can perform the same functions that a well crafted LLC can do.
The number of states that have L3C statutes is still very limited which requires foreign firms to follow additional formalities to legally operate.
While not yet proven, some proponents of L3Cs theorize that foundations will preference low-yield PRIs to grants. Thus, charities that rely on grant money will be harmed in the process.

== Examples of L3Cs ==
The types of businesses that can become L3Cs is broad and usually acceptable as long as it meets state statute requirements. Existing L3C businesses are in fields including but not limited to: alternative energy, food bank processing, media consulting, art funding, job creation programs, economic development, real estate, environmental remediation, and medical research. One example is SEEDR L3C, founded in 2008 in Atlanta to develop hardware, software, service, and policy solutions that help improve access to healthcare in Africa. In 2009, the Gates Foundation gave SEEDR L3C a $529,566 investment to fund the development of insulated containers for vaccine transport in developing countries. Today, SEEDR L3C's clients and funders include the US Centers for Disease Control & Prevention (CDC), Medecins Sans Frontieres (MSF), and UNICEF.

== See also ==
- Benefit corporation
- Social purpose corporation
- Community interest company (similar legal structure under United Kingdom law)
- Social entrepreneurship
