= B Corporation (certification) =

Social and environmental certification of for-profit companies

Certified B Corporation logo. This logo can only be used by companies certified by B Lab.

In business, a company that uses the "Certified B Corporation" trademark (also B Corporation or B Corp) is a for-profit corporation certified for its governance practices and its environmental and social impact by B Lab, a private global non-profit organization.

To be granted a company must meet B Lab's latest standards that are operative since 2026. These standards include mandatory requirements across seven important topics : Purpose & Stakeholder Governance, Fair Work, Justice, Equity, Diversity & Inclusion, Human Rights, Climate Action, Environmental Stewardship & Circularity and Government Affairs & Collective Action. Companies must also meet legal requirements concerning stakeholder governance, pay an annual fee based on their revenue, and undergo independent third-party verification. Under these latest standards, to be maintain, a certified company must go through the five-year cycle, with additional requirements and assessments at years three and five.

As of November 2026, there are more than 11,000 Certified B Corporations across 163 industries in 104 countries.

== Purpose ==
Example of a B Corp certification label

B Lab certification is a third-party standard requiring companies to meet social sustainability, environmental performance, and accountability standards. Certified firms must also remain transparent to the public regarding the score they receive on the assessment. This certification applies to the whole company across all product lines and issue areas.

One hurdle in pursuing certification is the administrative and legal costs a corporation faces when aligning its business model with B Lab's regulations. As a matter of law in Massachusetts, and other states that recognize the status, the certification itself carries no legal weight for shareholders, stakeholders, or employees. Instead, it serves as a branding tool. Academic research has analyzed B Corp certification as a signaling mechanism that may influence how investors and other stakeholders evaluate firms.

=== Benefits of certification ===
Certification introduces no additional legal liabilities to a C corporation or other for-profit business structures, provided their models adhere to B Lab's framework. Many C corporations seek B Corp certification to gain goodwill. Similar to other business associations, certified B Corporations and their employees have access to a number of discounts from outside entities and fellow members.

A study of 52 businesses in Spain revealed that the main motivations to get B Corp Certification are mostly internal. In fact, a company can see benefits in improving itself by following the B Corp standards and in differentiating itself from traditional profit oriented-businesses. The certification can become a real tool for businesses to continuously improve their practices and to achieve the Sustainable Development Goals. Some external motivations such as the visibility given to the company's commitment to social and environmental aspects are also desirable.

=== Challenges encoutered ===
B Lab certification has no legal status and is lacking in mandatory due diligence mechanisms. B Lab has been criticized for framing private sector led multi-stakeholder governance as a substitute for public sector regulation. In order to obtain and maintain a B Corporation certification, B Lab charges annual administrative and legal fees depending on the revenue generated by the respective companies which could result in a perverse incentive.

B Lab develops private, non-consensus standards rather than adhering to voluntary, consensus-based international standards. This has the potential for confusion and fragmentation in the marketplace for social responsibility. B Corporation has also been criticized for not being the "force for radical change" required to tackle the world's pressing problems. B Lab certification is not accredited. The European Commission proposed directive will require mandatory accreditation of verifiers. Private sector Multi-Stakeholder Initiatives (MSIs) may adopt weak or narrow standards that better serve corporate interests than rights holder interests.

== History and development ==
The B Corp movement started in 2006 in the US with the creation of B Lab. This initiative was led by three college friends, Jay Coen Gilbert, Bart Houlahan and Andrew Kassoy. B Lab emerged from their shared ambition to use the power of for-profit businesses to create public social and environmental value. Essentially, they wanted to create a real movement and allow companies to make statements about their responsible impact without legal requirements needed. By the end of 2007, 81 businesses were certified and had joined the movement.

Well-known businesses like Patagonia in 2011, Kickstarter in 2013 and Ben & Jerry's in 2012 became certified.

The movement eventually expanded beyond the US, particularly in Latin America and the Caribbean, with the creation of Sistema B, the first B Lab partner outside of the US. Its mission is to adapt B Corp certification's concept to a different regional economical and social context.

== Distinction from benefit corporation ==
In the United States, a benefit corporation is a legal status conferred by state law in the US. Legislation for the passage of benefit corporation legal status has been passed in 35 states, including Delaware.

B Lab certification is privately issued by a non-profit organization run by people principally from the business community. It has no legislative framework, and is not needed to obtain benefit corporation status.

== Certification process ==
The company needs to adhere their corporate legal structure to B Lab regulation in order to qualify for the certification process.

=== Online assessment ===
To obtain a B Corporation certification, a company first completes an online assessment. Companies that earn a minimum score of 80 out of 200 points undergo an assessment review process, essentially a conference call verifying the claims made in their assessment. Companies are required to provide supporting documentation before they are certified.

The assessment covers the company's entire operation and measures the positive impact of the company in areas of governance, workers, community, the environment, as well as the product or service the company provides. Socially and environmentally-focused business model points ultimately are accrued in their relevant impact area (governance, workers, community or environment). Depending on a company's industry, geographic location, and number of employees, the online assessment adjusts the weightings of the question categories to increase its relevancy. For instance, companies with more employees will have a heavier weighting in the workers category, and companies in manufacturing will have a heavier weighting in the environment category.

To maintain credibility, the B Corporation certification standard operates under principles that are independent, comprehensive, comparable, dynamic, and transparent. B Lab has an established standards advisory council that can independently make decisions with or without the support of B Lab. As of May 2014, 28 of 30 members were listed by their business affiliation. The council recommends improvements to the B Corp assessment on a biennial basis. There is a 30-day public consultation period before releasing a new version of the B Corporation assessment.

Currently the B Corp Impact Assessment is its sixth version which released in January 2019.

=== Requirements ===
Certification also requires companies to integrate their stakeholder commitments into the company governing documents. In the United States, the avenue for corporations making the legal amendment to certify will depend on the state in which they are incorporated. Some states, known as "constituency" states, will allow for this change in the articles of incorporation, but other states, known as "non-constituency states", will not; and many states now have the option of adopting the benefit corporation legal structure, which also meets B Lab's requirements for B Corp certification. Beyond the corporate model, other for-profit business entities make an amendment of the company by-laws or governing documents. These include:

- The establishment of clear wording to "consider stakeholder interests" in company articles of incorporation or company by-laws.
- Define "stakeholders" as their employees, the community, the environment, suppliers, customers, as well as existing shareholders.
- No prioritization of one stakeholder over another.
- Allowing for the company's values to exist under new management, investors, or ownership.

However, B Lab certification allows the company bylaws to remain secret.

The fact that B Corp standards are not legally enforceable, and that none of a companies' governing bodies and leadership are liable for damages if a company fails to meet them has also been flagged as a problem.

=== Verification and transparency requirements ===
On completing the assessment, a company is required to meet certain transparency requirements and background checks to become a certified B Corp. These requirements are: an in-depth review of public record of the companies, employees, products and other relative topics and randomised site visits. Companies are required to re-certify every 3 years.

== Distinction between B Corp and the norm ISO-14001 ==
B Corp certification can be compared to other sustainable standards such as the ISO-14001 norm. While B Corp evaluates an overall business' social and environmental performance, ISO-14001 focuses on establishing and improving an environmental management system (EMS). ISO-14001 is internationally recognized and contributes to climate action, with the aim of achieving climate neutrality and becoming resilient and adaptive in the climate change context.

B Corp and ISO-14001 both play an important role in corporate responsibility, with different approaches. ISO-14001 evaluates regulatory compliance to environmental laws and regulations, resource efficiency, risk management, and continuous improvement. B Corp certification also covers the environment, but also addresses the impacts on governance, workers, community, and customers. These two certifications can be complementary, as ISO-14001 can be a good foundation for environment requirements from B Lab. In fact, a study revealed that ISO-14001 businesses certified B Corp have higher scrores in the environmental dimension. B Corp can also expand a company's sustainable strategy to social and goverance impact.

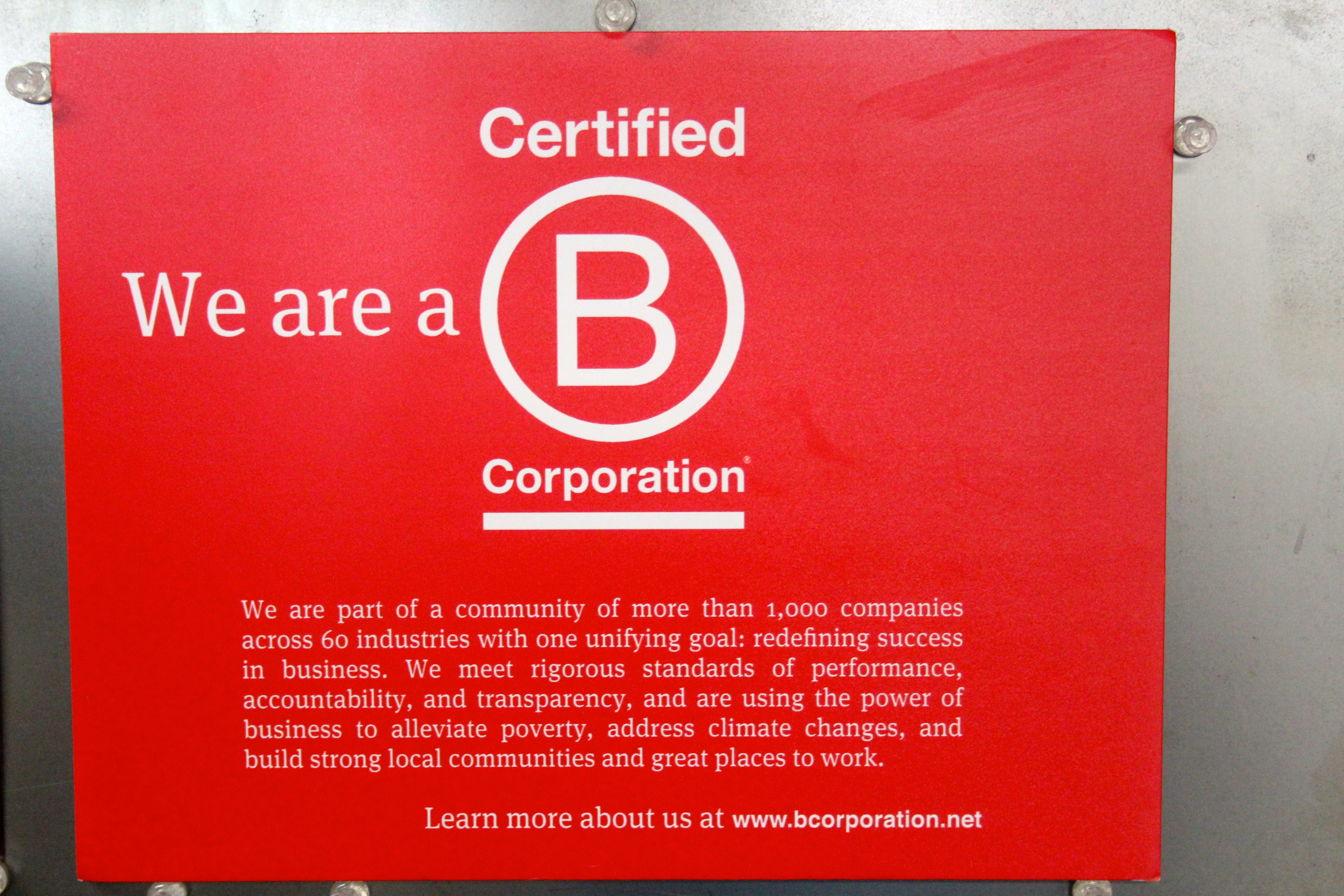
A corporation displaying signage in their workplace highlighting that they are B certified with a description of what that certification entails.

== Criticism and controversy ==
In 2021, BrewDog, a Fully Certified B Corp, was accused by former staff as having a "rotten culture". BrewDog's B Corp status was subsequently rescinded. In 2024, Aqua, a B Corp-certified bottled water brand, was identified as the most common type of litter found in Indonesian rivers, according to an audit by the river-cleanup NGO Sungai Watch.

In 2022, 30 Certified B Corps joined together with certification watchdog Fair World Project to petition against Nespresso's Certification as a B Corp, considering only 28% of their aluminum capsules are recycled. B Lab's decision to certify corporations with single use products, effectively putting these companies into the category of good corporate citizens, has resulted in accusations of greenwashing. B-Corp was described as "capitalism through certification" by Stir to Action, a UK co-operative infrastructure body that focuses on strategic economic development projects, with calls for more fundamental reforms that prioritize shared prosperity, democracy in the workplace, and sustainability.

In July 2024, four Havas agencies lost their B Corp status over work for Shell plc.

After announcing the decision to drop their B Corp Certification in February 2025, Dr. Bronner's Magic Soaps company issued a statement in May 2025 outlining their critiques of B Lab's official revision V7 of the B Corp Standards, echoing concerns of other B Corp certified companies of the potential for "greenwashing" by companies that otherwise fall short of the original goals of B Corp certification. Claiming in their February 2025 press release to have had the "highest B Corp score globally to-date of 206.7, surpassing the previously stated score ceiling of 200", Dr. Bronner's asserts:

"Business for good" is more than a trendy and profitable marketing strategy. As a purpose-driven company, we do business to model a more just economy, and to demonstrate that a truly constructive multi-stakeholder approach to capitalism could be the norm. The integrity of the B Corp Certification has become compromised and remaining certified now contradicts our mission.

There is also evidence that B Corp certification may not lead to sustainability outcomes such as the United Nations' Sustainable Development Goals (SDGs). Academic literature has also highlighted the ambivalent nature of B Corp certification, noting both its potential to promote responsible business practices and ongoing debates about its effectiveness and governance.

== International adoption ==
In November 2026, there were 11,160 Certified B Corporations across 163 industries in 106 countries, including US and Canada (2000+ companies), Australia and Aotearoa New Zealand (800+ companies), Europe (2780 companies), United Kingdom (3000+ companies), Africa (125 companies), and Afghanistan. The most active community outside of the United States is Sistema B. Recent research has examined how national institutional environments shape the global diffusion of B Corp certification across countries. Since 2012, Sistema B has been the adaptation of the B Corps movement in Latin America, including in Argentina, Brazil, Chile, Uruguay and Colombia. This non-profit adapts proprietary certifications and evaluation metrics and modifies both to the context of each country. B Lab also assists Sistema B in incorporating a benefit corporation distinction into local legal systems.

== See also ==
- List of benefit corporations
- Low-profit limited liability company
- Corporate governance
- Corporate social responsibility
- Multistakeholder governance
- Social purpose corporation
- Sustainable business
