= Benefit corporation =

Type of for-profit entity

Map of U.S. states which have passed laws allowing the formation of benefit corporations: Passed into law. No existing law. Bill failed a vote in the state's legislature.

In business, particularly in United States corporate law, a benefit corporation (or in some U.S. states, a public benefit corporation) is a type of for-profit corporate entity whose goals include making a positive impact on society. Laws concerning conventional corporations typically do not define the "best interest of society", which has led to the belief that increasing shareholder value (profits and/or share price) is the only overarching or compelling interest of a corporation. Benefit corporations explicitly specify that profit is not their only goal. An ordinary corporation may change to a benefit corporation merely by stating in its approved corporate bylaws that it is a benefit corporation, while in some jurisdictions, the corporation's name must also be changed to state that it is a benefit corporation as well.

A company chooses to become a benefit corporation in order to operate as a traditional for-profit business while simultaneously addressing social, economic, and/or environmental needs. A benefit corporation's directors and officers operate the business with the same authority and behavior as in a traditional corporation, but are required to consider the impact of their decisions not only on shareholders but also on employees, customers, the community, and the local and global environment. For an example of what additional impacts directors and officers are required to consider, view the Maryland Code § 5-6C-07 – Duties of director. The nature of the business conducted by the corporation does not affect its status as a benefit corporation. Instead, it provides a justification for including public benefits in their missions and activities.

The benefit corporation legislation ensures that a director is required to consider other public benefits in addition to profit, preventing shareholders from using a drop in stock value as evidence for dismissal or a lawsuit against the corporation. Transparency provisions require benefit corporations to publish annual benefit reports of their social and environmental performance using a comprehensive, credible, independent, and transparent third-party standard. However, few of the states have included provisions for the removal of benefit corporation status or fines if the companies fail to publish benefit reports that comply with the state statutes.

As of 2022, 37 U.S. states authorized the creation of benefit corporations and four were working on it. Outside those jurisdictions there are no legal standards that define what constitutes a benefit corporation. With jurisdictions that recognize this form of business, a benefit corporation is intended "to merge the traditional for-profit business corporation model with a non-profit model by allowing social entrepreneurs to consider interests beyond those of maximizing shareholder wealth." In jurisdictions where regulations have not been enacted, a benefit corporation need not be certified or audited by the third-party standard. Instead, it may use third-party standards solely as a rubric to measure its own performance.

== History ==
=== United States ===
In April 2010, Maryland became the first U.S. state to pass benefit corporation legislation. As of March 2018, 36 states and Washington, D.C., have passed legislation allowing for the creation of benefit corporations: and enhance corporate responsibility.

State	Date passed	Date in effect	Legislation
Alabama	December 31, 2020	January 1, 2021	Act 2020-73, §8.
Arizona	April 30, 2013	December 31, 2014	SB 1238 Archived March 4, 2016, at the Wayback Machine
Arkansas	April 19, 2013	July 18, 2013	HB 1510
California	October 9, 2011	January 1, 2012	AB 361
Colorado	May 15, 2013	April 1, 2014	HB 13-1138
Connecticut	April 24, 2014	October 1, 2014	SB 23, HB 5597 Section 140
Delaware	July 17, 2013	August 1, 2013	SB 47
Georgia	July 29, 2020	January 1, 2021	HB 230
Florida	June 20, 2014	July 1, 2014	SB 654, HB 685
Hawaii	July 8, 2011	July 8, 2011	SB 298
Idaho	April 2, 2015	July 1, 2015	SB 1076
Illinois	August 2, 2012	January 1, 2013	SB 2897
Indiana	April 30, 2015	July 1, 2015	HB 1015
Iowa	June 8, 2021	June 8, 2021	HB 844
Kansas	March 30, 2017	July 1, 2017	HB 2153
Kentucky	March 7, 2017	July 1, 2017	HB 35 Archived June 7, 2017, at the Wayback Machine
Louisiana	May 31, 2012	August 1, 2012	HB 1178 Archived September 21, 2021, at the Wayback Machine
Maine	Jun 17, 2019	Jun 17, 2019	LD 1519
Maryland	April 13, 2010	October 1, 2010	SB 690/HB 1009
Massachusetts	August 7, 2012	December 1, 2012	2012 Acts, Chapter 238
Minnesota	April 29, 2014	January 1, 2015	SF 2053, HF 2582
Montana	April 27, 2015	October 1, 2015	HB 2458
Nebraska	April 2, 2014	July 18, 2014	LB 751
Nevada	May 24, 2013	January 1, 2014	AB 89 Archived June 7, 2015, at the Wayback Machine
New Hampshire	July 11, 2014	January 1, 2015	SB 215
New Jersey	January 10, 2011	March 1, 2011	S 2170 Archived September 26, 2015, at the Wayback Machine
New Mexico	February 18, 2020	February 18, 2020	HB 118, Bill History
New York	December 12, 2011	February 10, 2012	A4692-a and S79-a
Ohio	December 18, 2020	March 24, 2021	SB 21
Oklahoma	April 15, 2019	November 1, 2019	HB 2423
Oregon	June 18, 2013	January 1, 2014	HB 2296
Pennsylvania	October 12, 2012	January 1, 2013	HB 1616
Rhode Island	July 17, 2013	January 1, 2014	HB 5720
South Carolina	June 6, 2012	June 14, 2012	HB 4766
Tennessee	May 20, 2015	January 1, 2016	HB 0767/SB 0972
Texas	June 14, 2017	September 1, 2017	HB 3488
Utah	April 1, 2014	May 13, 2014	SB 133
Vermont	May 19, 2010	July 1, 2011	S 263
Virginia	March 26, 2011	July 1, 2011	HB 2358
Washington, D.C.	February 8, 2013	May 1, 2013	B 19-058 Archived September 27, 2015, at the Wayback Machine
West Virginia	March 31, 2014	July 1, 2014	SB 202
Wisconsin	November 27, 2017	February 26, 2018	SB298 Act 77

Connecticut's benefit corporation law is the first to allow "preservation clauses", which allow the corporation's founders to prevent it from reverting to a 'For Profit' entity at the will of their shareholders.

==== Public benefit LLCs ====
A subset of benefit corporation, the public benefit LLC, allows for limited liability companies the same opportunities afforded to corporations under a state's benefit corporation law.

State	Date passed	Date in effect	Legislation
Delaware	July 23, 2018	August 1, 2018	SB 183, 149th Gen. Assem.
Kansas	April 18, 2019	July 1, 2019	HB 2039
Maryland	May 19, 2011	June 1, 2011	HB 1511, SB 595
Oregon	June 18, 2013	January 1, 2014	HB 2296
Pennsylvania	November 21, 2016	February 19, 2017	HB 1398
Utah	March 19, 2018	March 19, 2018	HB 186

Similar bills have been introduced in Connecticut and Illinois.

==== Social purpose corporations ====
Some states have passed legislation for creating social purpose corporations (SPCs), which are more flexible in their legal requirements and responsibilities compared to benefit corporations.

State	Date passed	Date in effect	Legislation
California	October 9, 2011	January 1, 2012	SB 201 and SB 1532 for FPCs; revised and renamed as SPCs in 2015 via SB 1301
Florida	June 20, 2014	July 1, 2014	SB 654, HB 685
Washington	March 30, 2012	June 7, 2012	HB 2239

==== Low-profit limited liability companies ====
Low-profit limited liability companies (L3Cs) were created to comply with the Internal Revenue Service (IRS) program-related investments (PRIs) rules (26 U.S.C. § 170(c)(2)(B)) which allow most typically private foundations the ability to maintain tax-exempt status through investments in qualifying businesses and/or charities. They blend aspects of law regarding limited liability companies with aspects of non-profit law, but remain for-profit companies for tax purposes.

State	Date passed	Date in effect	Legislation
Illinois	August 4, 2009	January 1, 2010	SB 239
Louisiana	June 21, 2011	June 21, 2011	HB 1421
Maine	June 8, 2009	June 8, 2009	LD 1265
Michigan	January 15, 2009	January 15, 2009	SB 1446
Rhode Island	June 8, 2011	January 1, 2012	SB 0353
Utah	April 1, 2013	May 14, 2013	SB 21
Vermont	April 30, 2008	April 30, 2008	HB 775
Wyoming	February 26, 2009	July 1, 2009	HB 0182

==== Public benefit cooperatives ====
In Colorado, all four types of cooperatives (worker, producer, consumer and multi-stakeholder/limited-liability cooperatives) may register as benefit corporations under the Colorado Public Benefit Corporations Act while retaining their cooperative status.

=== Outside of the United States ===
==== Canada ====
In May 2018, the leader of the British Columbia Green Party introduced a bill to amend the Business Corporations Act to permit the incorporation of "benefit companies" in British Columbia. On June 30, 2020, British Columbia became the first province in Canada to offer the option of incorporating as a benefit company.

==== Colombia ====
In 2018, Colombia introduced benefit corporation legislation.

==== Israel ====
Israeli law defines a public benefit company in chapter 9 of its Companies Law, with the current definition stemming from a 2007 amendment. Public benefit companies may only draw their stated goals from a closed list codified in law, and are prohibited from distributing dividends.

==== Italy ====
In December 2015, the Italian Parliament passed legislation recognizing a new kind of organization, named Società Benefit, which was directly modeled after benefit corporations in the United States.

==== United Kingdom ====
In the United Kingdom, Community Interest Companies (CIC) were introduced in 2005, intended "for people wishing to establish businesses which trade with a social purpose..., or to carry on other activities for the benefit of the community".

== Differences from traditional corporations ==
Historically, U.S. corporate law has not been structured or tailored to address the situation of for-profit companies that wish to pursue a social or environmental mission. While corporations generally have the ability to pursue a broad range of activities, corporate decision-making is usually justified in terms of creating long-term shareholder value.

The idea that a corporation has as its purpose to maximize financial gain for its shareholders was first articulated in Dodge v. Ford Motor Co. in 1919. Over time, through both law and custom, the concept of "shareholder primacy" has come to be widely accepted. This was reaffirmed in 2010 for Delaware corporations by the case eBay Domestic Holdings, Inc. v. Craig Newmark, et al., 3705-CC, 61 (Del. Ch. 2010)., in which the Delaware Chancery Court stated that a non-financial mission that "seeks not to maximize the economic value of a for-profit Delaware corporation for the benefit of its stockholders" is inconsistent with directors' fiduciary duties. However, the fiduciary duties do not list profit or financial gains specifically, and to date no corporate charters have been written that identify profit as one of those duties.

In the ordinary course of business, decisions made by a corporation's directors are generally protected by the business judgment rule, under which courts are reluctant to second-guess operating decisions made by directors. In a takeover or change of control situation, however, courts give less deference to directors' decisions and require that directors obtain the highest price in order to maximize shareholder value in the transaction. Thus a corporation may be unable to maintain its focus on social and environmental factors in a change of control situation because of the pressure to maximize shareholder value.

Mission-driven businesses, impact investors, and social entrepreneurs are constrained by this legal framework, which is not equipped to accommodate for-profit entities whose mission is central to their existence.

Even in states that have passed "constituency" statutes, which permit directors and officers of ordinary corporations to consider non-financial interests when making decisions, legal uncertainties make it difficult for mission-driven businesses to know when they are allowed to consider additional interests. Without clear case law, directors may still fear civil claims if they stray from their fiduciary duties to the owners of the business to maximize profit.

By contrast, benefit corporations expand the fiduciary duty of directors to require them to consider non-financial stakeholders as well as the interests of shareholders. This gives directors and officers of mission-driven businesses the legal protection to pursue an additional mission and consider additional stakeholders. The enacting state's benefit corporation statutes are placed within existing state corporation codes so that the codes apply to benefit corporations in every respect except those explicit provisions unique to the benefit corporation form.

== Provisions ==
Typical major provisions of a benefit corporation are:

Purpose

- Shall create general public benefit.
- Shall have the right to name specific public benefit purposes
- The creation of public benefit is in the best interests of the benefit corporation.

Accountability

- Directors' duties are to make decisions in the best interests of the corporation
- Directors and officers shall consider effect of decisions on shareholders and employees, suppliers, customers, community, environment (together the "stakeholders")

Transparency

- Shall publish annual Benefit Report in accordance with recognized third party standards for defining, reporting, and assessing social and environmental performance
- Benefit Report delivered to: 1) all shareholders; and 2) public website with exclusion of proprietary data

Right of action

- Only shareholders and directors have right of action
- Right of action can be for 1) violation of or failure to pursue general or specific public benefit; 2) violation of duty or standard of conduct

Change of control/purpose/structure

- Shall require a minimum status vote which is a 2/3 vote in most states, but slightly higher in a few states

Benefit corporations are treated like all other corporations for tax purposes.

== Benefits ==
Benefit corporation laws address concerns held by entrepreneurs who wish to raise growth capital but fear losing control of the social or environmental mission of their business. In addition, the laws provide companies the ability to consider factors other than the highest purchase offer at the time of sale, in spite of the ruling on Revlon, Inc. v. MacAndrews & Forbes Holdings, Inc. Chartering as a benefit corporation also allows companies to distinguish themselves as businesses with a social conscience, and as one that aspires to a standard they consider higher than profit-maximization for shareholders. Yvon Chouinard, founder of Patagonia, has written "Benefit corporation legislation creates the legal framework to enable companies like Patagonia to stay mission-driven through succession, capital raises, and even changes in ownership, by institutionalizing the values, culture, processes, and high standards put in place by founding entrepreneurs."

Oregon House Bill 3572, signed by the governor of Oregon in July 2023, allows public contracting agencies to award contracts to benefit corporations if the cost of the goods and services is not more than 5% higher than that available from another company.

== Benefit corporation vs. certified benefit corporation ==
There is a difference between being a benefit corporation in a state, and being a certified benefit corporation also known as a B Corporation. B Corporations voluntarily promise to run their firm with social and environmental causes as a concern. To receive their certification from B Lab they must score a minimum of 80 out of 200 on a survey called the B impact assessment. Next, they will have to pass through an audit process. Finally, the firms wishing to remain certified will be required to pay an annual fee to B Lab. Furthermore, companies will pledge to incorporate as a benefit corporation before their re-certification.

== Benefit corporations and cooperatives ==
Benefit corporations are not synonymous with cooperatives, which are a type of corporate governance in which the governance and shares are equally held by their members, such as all employees or all consumers. However, a benefit corporation may also be organized as a cooperative or vice versa.

== Taxation ==
A public benefit corporation is a legal entity that is organized and taxed as either an S corporation or C corporation. An S or C corporation will not change its tax status upon transferring to a public benefit corporation, while an LLC, partnership or sole proprietorship will have to. While public benefit corporations are taxed the same as their underlying corporation status, there is added benefit to taxation on charitable contributions. If a firm makes donations to a qualifying non-profit, the charitable contributions receive a tax-deductible status. This will lower a firm's taxes compared to a typical C-corporation that is not donating money and only focusing on short term profits.

== Possible incentives to change to a benefit corporation ==
Reorganizing as a public benefit corporation affords a corporation's directors and founders protection from shareholder lawsuits when pursuing decisions that benefit the public at the expense of short-term profits. Furthermore, firms that transition typically experience advantages in retaining employees, increasing their customer loyalty and attracting prospective talent that will mesh well into the company culture.

== Transition process ==
Changing status to a public benefit corporation requires several steps. First, the firm should choose one or more specific public benefit projects that it will pursue. Next, the articles of incorporation should be amended to state at the beginning that the firm is a public benefit corporation. The term public benefit corporation (PBC) or another abbreviation may be added to the entity's name if the founders choose. Finally the share certificates that are issued by the entity should state that the firm is a public benefit corporation. A shareholder vote is required to amend the articles which must include "non-voting" shares. The vote must gain a two-thirds majority to pass, depending on the Articles of Incorporation. Shareholders should be notified early that dissenter's rights apply. Dissenter's rights mean that those that vote against the amendment and qualify, may require the company to buy back their shares at fair value before the change. Firms making the transition should also perform a "due diligence review" of their business contracts, affairs and status in order to avoid any unforeseen liability associated with changing the form of the entity.

The transition process is different state by state but for Colorado it is as follows. First, the firm must prepare the aforementioned amended articles. Then, they also amend their bylaws and assign responsibilities to the board of directors. Next, the amendments must be approved by the directors before going to a shareholder vote. Finally they file the amended articles of incorporation with the secretary of the state.

If the prior entity is an LLC or partnership there is an extra step required. For these entities the articles of incorporation themselves and the related bylaws must first be prepared and filed with the state secretary. Only then will it be possible to merge or transition the previous form into the benefit corporation.

== Investor and consumer preferences ==
According to William Mitchell Law Review journal, about 68 million US customers have a preference for making decisions about their purchases based on a sense of environmental or social responsibility. Some individuals even go as far as using their purchases to "punish" companies for bad corporate behavior when it pertains to environmental or social cause. Others do the opposite, and use their purchasing power to reward firms that they believe are doing social or environmental good. The Mitchell Law Review also states that around 49% of Americans have at some point in time boycotted firms whose behavior they see as "not in the best interest of society." Recent research also suggests that when variables like price and quality are held constant, 87% of customers would switch from a less socially responsible brand to a more socially responsible competitor.

== See also ==
- B corporation (certification) – Social and environmental certification of for-profit companies
- Charitable organization – Nonprofit organization with charitable purpose
- Community interest company – UK company using their profits and assets for the public good
- Community organization – Civil society non-profit operating in a distinct area
- Conscious business – Business concept
- Examples of Delaware benefit corporations (known legally as public benefit corporations or PBCs):
  - Kickstarter – US-based crowdfunding platform
  - Change.org – American petition website
  - TED (conference) – American-Canadian organization of conferences
  - Anthropic – American artificial intelligence company
  - OpenAI – American artificial intelligence company
- Flexible purpose corporation – California corporation pursuing a social benefit
- Green America – US non-profit organization
- Impact investing – Investing for socio-environmental impact and profit
- Low-profit limited liability company – Legal form of business entity in the US
- Public-benefit nonprofit corporation – Chartered by a US state government
- Social enterprise – Type of organisation
- Social purpose corporation – For-profit that enables, without requiring, social or environmental decision making
- Socially responsible investing – Any investment strategy combining both financial performance and social/ethical impact
- Stakeholder theory – Management and ethical theory that considers multiple constituencies
- Sustainable business – Minimal negative or positive effect on the environment
- Workplace spirituality – Grassroots movement since early 1920s
