= List of social enterprises =

This is an annotated list of social enterprises sufficiently notable to have a Wikipedia article, in alphabetical order. For quick navigation, click on one of the letters:

== A ==
- Aarong
- Acumen
- Appropriate Infrastructure Development Group
- Aravind Eye Hospitals
- Ashoka

== B ==
- Barefoot College
- Benetech
- Better World Books
- Bharat Financial Inclusion Limited
- BioLite
- BookBox
- BRAC

== C ==
- CAP Markets
- Care2
- Casa Mesita
- Change.org
- Charity Checkout
- CharityVillage.com
- Chavez for Charity
- Chemonics
- Cherie Amie
- Closing the Loop
- Comic Relief
- Cycling Without Age

== D ==
- Deep Springs International
- Defy Ventures
- DuckDuckGo

== E ==
- Ecosia
- Elephant Parade
- Enercoop
- Engine No. 1
- Envirofit International

== F ==
- Fair Trade USA
- Five Talents
- FlipGive

== G ==
- Glad Foundation
- Grassroots Business Fund
- Grameen Bank
- Grama Vidiyal
- Greyston Bakery

== H ==
- Higher Ground
- Housing Works
- Husk Power Systems
- HVAC (organization)

== I ==
- Institute for OneWorld Health

== J ==
- Jaipur Rugs

== K ==
- Kiva

== L ==
- LifeStraw
- Locast

== M ==
- Masarang Foundation
- Me to We
- MicroConsignment

== N ==
- Newman's Own
- Nuru International

== O ==
- One Acre Fund
- Orangi Pilot Project

== P ==
- PAMbio
- Partners In Health
- Pratham
- Proximity Designs

== R ==
- RepaNet
- RWB 330

== S ==
- Samasource
- Schwab Foundation for Social Entrepreneurship
- Sea Ranger Service
- SEKEM
- Shristi
- SIRUM

== T ==
- TeachAids
- Techreturns
- TerraCycle
- Toms Shoes
- Trew Era Cafe
- ThankYou
- Tony's Chocolonely

== V ==
- Vollpension

== W ==
- WakaWaka

== Y ==
- Yunus Social Business – Global Initiatives
