= Social enterprise =

Type of organisation

A social enterprise is an organisation that applies commercial strategies to maximise improvements in financial, social and environmental well-being. Profit made through fundraising or the sale of products is reinvested in the organisation's mission, making them more sustainable than a non-profit organisation that may solely rely on grant money, donations or government policies. A social enterprise's main purpose is to promote, encourage, and make social change in a financially sustainable way. Unlike conventional businesses, social enterprises embed social or environmental goals into their core objectives while maintaining financial sustainability. They aim to create social value while generating income, reinvesting profits into their mission rather than relying solely on philanthropy. Social enterprises can provide income-generating opportunities to address basic needs, particularly for people living in poverty. They combine financial viability with a social purpose and can expand or replicate their models to increase impact. They are often considered more sustainable than non-profit organisations, which may rely heavily on donations or government support.

== Overview ==
=== Origins and definitions ===
One of the first examples of a social enterprise, in the form of a social cooperative, can be traced back to the Victorian era. Like social cooperatives, social enterprises are believed to have emerged as a result of state and market failure. However, market failure is emphasised in the UK, while state failure is emphasised in the United States. Contemporary social enterprises are viewed to have been created as a result of the evolution of non-profits.

The first description of a social enterprise as a democratically owned and run trading organisation that is financially independent, has social objectives and operates in an environmentally responsible way, was put forward by Freer Spreckley in the UK in 1978 and later written as a publication in 1981. It was developed as an alternative commercial organisational model to private businesses, co-operatives, and public enterprises. The concept, at that time, had five main principles divided into three values and two paradigm shifts. The three values, now referred to as the triple bottom line were:

- Trading and financially viable independence
- Creating social wealth
- Operating in environmentally responsible ways

The two paradigm shifts were:

- A common ownership legal structure where members/owners have one voting share and different forms of investment
- Democratic governance, where each worker/community resident is a member with one vote

It was intended as part of the original concept that social enterprises should plan, measure and report on financial performance, social-wealth creation, and environmental responsibility by the use of a social accounting and audit system.

Social enterprise has philanthropic roots in the United States and cooperative roots in Europe and Asia. In the US, the term is associated with 'doing charity by doing trade', rather than 'doing charity while doing trade'. In other countries, there is a much stronger emphasis on community organising, democratic control of capital, and mutual principles than on philanthropy.

=== Types and differences ===
Social enterprises can be structured as a business, a partnership for profit, or a non-profit. Depending on in which country the entity exists and the legal forms available, they may take the form of a co-operative, mutual organisation, a disregarded entity, a social business, a benefit corporation, a community interest company, a company limited by guarantee, or a charity organisation. They can also take more conventional structures. Social enterprises are dynamic, requiring adaptation to ensure they meet the needs of communities and individuals in an ever-changing world. Their shared common thread is that they all operate to achieve a balanced financial, social and environmental set of objectives. Types of social enterprises includes trading enterprises, financial institutions, community organisations, and NGOs and charities.

Trading enterprises are worker- and employee-owned trading enterprises, co-operatives, and collectives. These vary from very large enterprises—such as John Lewis Partnership in the UK and the Mondragon Corporation in Spain—to medium-sized enterprises owned by their staff with traditional management hierarchies and pay differentials, to small worker cooperatives with only a few directors and employees who work in less hierarchical ways and practice wage parity. Within the trading enterprises, there are employee-owned enterprises and membership-owned enterprises. Examples of membership organisations registered as social enterprises are community enterprises, housing co-operatives, community interest companies with asset locks, community centres, pubs and shops, associations, housing associations, and football clubs. These usually exist for a specific purpose and trade commercially. All operate to reinvest profits in the community. They have large memberships that are customers or supporters of the organisation's key purpose. There are village cooperatives in India and Pakistan that were established as far back as 1904.

Organisations that do not take the distinct form of either a private, public, or non-profit organisation are classified as hybrid organisations. For legal and tax purposes, hybrid forms are classified as for-profit entities. The most common types of hybrid organisations are the low-profit limited liability company (L3C) and the benefit corporation (B-Corp). L3C's main objective is to achieve socially beneficial goals and do so by employing the financial and flexible advantages of a limited liability company. States in the United States that have authorised the use of the L3C model have established three requirements: to operate for charitable or educational purposes, not the production of income, and not the fulfilment of a political or legislative agenda. A benefit corporation, or B-Corp, is a corporation that operates to achieve or create a "general public benefit".

Many non-governmental organisations (NGOs) and charities operate commercial consulting and training enterprises or subsidiary trading enterprises, such as Oxfam International. The profits are used to provide salaries for people who provide free services to specific groups of people or to further the social or environmental aims of the organisation. While not all social enterprises are non-profits, and vice versa, some social enterprises operate in a non-profit form. They earn income for their goods or services and are typically regarded as non-profits that use business strategies to generate revenue to support their charitable missions.

The organisational and legal principles embedded in social enterprises have, in some instances, come from non-profit organisations. Non-profit organisations rely on governmental and public support, but can struggle to obtain funding and, as result, have started to rely on profits from their own social change operations. The methods by which social enterprises create sustainable revenue streams differ between social businesses, but all share the goal of abandoning the need for government or donor support. Gregory Dees and Beth Anderson discuss this difference in funding strategies as the innovation that differentiates the social enterprise from the traditional non-profit actor. The Social Enterprise Alliance (SEA) identified four factors that they believe caused this transition: increase in non-profit operating costs; decline in government and public philanthropic support; increased competition due to growth in the charitable sector; and expansion in the demand for non-profit provided services. In 2012, survey data from non-profits in 12 countries found that donations accounted for 12% of income, with the largest source of income (43%) coming from revenue-generating activities. Some non-profits have evolved their business model to model that of a social enterprise. This change has resulted in a type of hybrid organisation that does not have concrete organisational boundaries. Various scholars have argued that this may have come about due to the marketisation of the non-profit sector, which resulted in many non-profit firms placing more focus on generating income. Other scholars have used institutional theory to conclude that non-profits have adopted social enterprise models, because such models have become legitimised and widely accepted. Some organisations have evolved into social enterprises.

Social impact may refer to the overall effects of a business, but a business that has social impact may or may not be a social enterprise. Corporate social responsibility (CSR) is a practise that businesses can use to be conscious of the social and environmental impacts of their activities. There are a variety of CSR markers, such as accountability and internal and external elements. Social enterprises place a lot of emphasis on external social responsibility as a result of their social objectives, so social impact is built into the organisation. However, there has been debate on whether or not social enterprises place enough emphasis on internal CSR, such as human resources and capital management, health and safety standards, adaptation to innovation and change, and the quality of management within the organisation. Since a large majority of social enterprises do not have sufficient funding, they are unable to pay competitive wages to their employees, and, as a result, have to resort to other, non-financial techniques to recruit employees. Many managers utilise the social component of the social enterprise's dual mission and purpose for this. Financial institutions are savings and loan organisations such as credit unions, microcredit organisations, cooperative banks, and revolving loan funds, and are membership-owned social enterprises. Credit unions were first established in the 1850s in Germany and spread internationally. Cooperative banks have likewise been around since the 1870s, owned as a subsidiary of a membership co-operative. In recent times, microcredit organisations have sprung up in many developing countries to great effect. Local currency exchanges and social value exchanges are also being established.

Socially responsible investing (SRI) seeks to maximise both financial gain and social impact. Many commercial enterprises would consider themselves to have social objectives, but commitment to these objectives is motivated by the perception that such commitment will ultimately make the enterprise more financially valuable. These are organisations that might be more properly said to be operating corporate responsibility policies. Social enterprises differ in that their commitment to impact is central to the mission of the business. Like social enterprise, social entrepreneurship has a variety of existing definitions. Currently, there is not a widely accepted standard definition for the term, and descriptions vary in level of detail. There is an emphasis on change agents for social entrepreneurship, in contrast to the organisational focus of social enterprises. Social entrepreneurship usually takes place in the non-profit sector, with a focus on creating and implementing new solutions.

Tensions between social missions and business ventures within a social enterprise are separated into four distinct categories: performing, organising, belonging, and learning. Performance tensions arise as organisations seek to fulfil various conflicting goals, such as varying stakeholder demands, social mission goals, and performance metrics. A major challenge is figuring out how to gauge success with conflicting goals. Organising tensions are caused by inconsistencies in organisational structure, culture, and human resource practices. Many social organisations grapple with whom to hire, as many want to help disadvantaged people but also need workers with business skills to ensure the success of the enterprise. Organisations face the challenge of deciding which organisational structure and legal form (e.g., non-Profit, for-profit) to operate under. Belonging tensions arise from identification or a sense of belonging to contrasting goals and values, which creates internal organisational conflict. These tensions are amplified by the maintenance of relationships with stakeholders who may have conflicting identities within the organisation. Learning tensions are a result of conflicting time horizons (i.e., short-term vs. long-run). In the short term, organisations aim for stability, which can be evaluated based on metrics such as costs, profits, and revenues, but in the long run, they want growth, flexibility, and progress in achieving their social mission.

=== Academia ===
When social enterprise first emerged, much of the scholarly literature focused on defining the key characteristics and definitions of social enterprise. Since then, there is more of a focus on the emergence of the social enterprise sector, as well as the internal management of social enterprise organisations. Due to the dual-purpose missions of social enterprises, organisations cannot directly employ the typical management strategies of established business models. Recent academic literature has argued against prior positively held views of social enterprises success in striking a balance between the two tensions and instead argued that the social mission is being compromised in favour of financial stability. Prioritising social good over financial stability contradicts rational firm management, which typically prioritises financial and profit-seeking goals. As a result, different management issues arise that range from stakeholders (and management) agreeing on the firm's goals but disagreeing on an action plan to management and stakeholders disagreeing on the firm's goals. Some social enterprises have taken on same-sector and cross-sector partnerships, while others continue to operate independently.

The first academic paper to propose worker co-operatives involved in health and rehabilitation work as a form social enterprise was published in 1993. The scale and integration of co-operative development in the 'red belt' of Italy (some 7,000 worker, and 8,000 social co-operatives) inspired the formation of the EMES network of social economy researchers who subsequently spread the language to the UK and the rest of Europe through influential English language publications. The first international social enterprise journal was established in 2005 by Social Enterprise London (with support from the London Development Association). The Social Enterprise Journal has been followed by the Journal of Social Entrepreneurship, and coverage of issues pertaining to the social economy and social enterprise is also covered by the Journal of Co-operative Studies and the Annals of Co-operative and Public Economics. The European Social Enterprise Research Network (EMES) and the Co-operative Research Unit (CRU) at the Open University have also published research into social enterprise. The Skoll World Forum, organised jointly by Oxford and Duke universities, brings together researchers and practitioners from across the globe.

In the United States, Harvard, Stanford and Princeton universities built on the work of Ashoka and contributed to the development of the social entrepreneurship field through project initiatives and publications. As of 2018, the field of social enterprise studies had not yet developed firm philosophical foundations, but its advocates and academic community were becoming more engaged with critical pedagogies, such as that of Paulo Freire, and critical traditions in research, like critical theory, institutional theory and Marxism, in comparison to private-sector business education. Teaching related to the social economy draws explicitly from the works of Robert Owen, Proudhon, and Karl Marx, with works by Bourdieu and Putnam informing the debate over social capital and its relationship to the competitive advantage of mutuals. This intellectual foundation, however, does not extend as strongly into the field of social entrepreneurship, where there is more influence from writings on liberalism and entrepreneurship by Joseph Schumpeter in conjunction with the emerging fields of social innovation, actor-network theory, and complexity theory to explain its processes. Social enterprise, unlike private enterprise, is not taught exclusively in a business school context, as it is increasingly connected to the health sector and to public service delivery. However, Oxford University's Said Business School does host the Skoll World Forum, a global event focused on social entrepreneurs.

== Africa ==
=== Kenya ===
In Kenya, many NGOs use business models to improve the lives of people, mainly in rural Kenya. KOMAZA is a social enterprise that plants trees with smallholder farmers and uses economies of scale to enable them to access high value markets for processed trees. Another organisation, RISE Kenya, runs projects to mitigate climate change in the semiarid Eastern Province of Kenya. They also run weaving projects whereby women who would traditionally engage in weaving make products that are marketed in Nairobi and in European and American markets. Other social enterprises in Kenya include the One Acre Fund, Nuru International and M-Pesa, the latter of which facilitates economic transactions via mobile phone. The organisation Alive & Kicking has produced over 200,000 sports balls from its stitching centre in Nairobi. Social enterprises iHub and NaiLab are centres for technological enterprise, with ventures such as Tandaa in cooperation with the ICT Board of Kenya and Akirachix.

=== Zambia ===
Social enterprises in Zambia are often focused on the creation of sustainable employment. Alive & Kicking established a stitching centre in Lusaka in 2007, which employs 50 stitchers and produces 2,000 sports balls a month. Zambikes produces a range of bicycles from their Lusaka factory, including 'Zambulances' and ones made from bamboo, and provide three levels of mechanic training.

== Asia ==
=== China ===
Researcher Meng Zhao states that social enterprise as a concept emerged in China around 2012, although it was not yet a well-known idea among the general public, and the Chinese government was still "trying to understand the new phenomenon". He identified three forms in China: the social enterprise; the social startup; and the startup for social good. The terms "startup" is used because it carries some of the spirit associated with "enterprise" in English, such as innovation, risk taking or "venture".

There is no separate legal entity for social enterprises in Hong Kong. They are normally registered as companies or non-profit organisations. The Hong Kong Government defines social enterprises as businesses that achieve specific social objectives, and its profits will be principally reinvested in the business for the social objectives that it pursues, rather than distribution to its shareholders. In recent years, venture philanthropy organisations, such as Social Ventures Hong Kong and Social Enterprise Business Centre of the Hong Kong Council of Social Service, have been set up to invest in viable social enterprises with a significant social impact.

=== India ===
In India, a social enterprise may be a non-profit NGO, often registered as a Society under the Societies Registration Act, 1860; a Trust registered under various Indian State Trust Acts; or a Section 8 Company registered under the Companies Act, 2013. India has around three million NGOs, including a number of religious organisations and trusts, like temples, mosques and gurudwara associations, who are not considered social enterprises. In the agricultural sector, International Development Enterprises has helped pull millions of small farmers out of poverty in India. Another area of social enterprise in India and the developing world are bottom of the pyramid (BOP) businesses, which were identified and analysed by C. K. Prahalad in Fortune at the Base of the Pyramid.

The term "social enterprise" is not widely used in India. Instead, terms like NGOs and NPOs (non-profit organisations) are used, where these kind of organisations are legally allowed to raise fund for non-business activities. NGOs in India raise funds through some services, often fund raising events and community activities, and occasionally products. Child Rights and You and Youth United are examples of social enterprises that raise funds through their services, fund-raising activities (organising events, donations, and grants) or products to further their social and environmental goals. According to SOPAR-Canada's sister organisation Bala Vikasa Social Service Society, "Social Enterprise is a hybrid business with a goal of solving social problems, while also generating revenues and profits like any other enterprise. However, when it comes to choosing between profits or social cause, social cause is paramount for social enterprises, while profits are considered only for sustainability."

=== Malaysia ===
Social Enterprise Alliance Malaysia defines social enterprises as "organizations created to address social problems that use business models to sustain themselves financially...[they] seek to create not only financial returns but also social returns to their beneficiaries." In Malaysia, government bodies, like MaGIC, seek to strengthen Malaysia's position as an emerging innovation nation. One of MaGIC's key missions is "nurturing and navigating local startup and social enterprise into successful and sustainable businesses". One initiative by MaGIC in 2017 was the Impact Driven Enterprise Accreditation (IDEA). MaGIC also launched Buy For Impact, which encourages companies to purchase products or services from social enterprises. This initiative promotes conscious buying behaviours among the general public and the private sector, stressing the importance and impact of purchasing power.

On April 23, 2022, Prime Minister Ismail Sabri Yaakob outlined a new direction for the country on social entrepreneurship development in his report, Social Entrepreneurship Action Framework 2030 (SEMy2030). SEMy2030 will provide more structured training on the adaptation of technology and digitalisation, widen access to financing and financial support, and provide access to the domestic and international markets.

=== Philippines ===
In December 1999, a group of entrepreneurs, executives, and academics in Metro Manila started the Social Enterprise Network (SEN), which serves as a networking opportunity for like-minded individuals to share their interests and experience. One of its projects, the Cooperative Marketing Enterprise (CME), was eventually adopted by the Foundations for People Development. CME is devoted solely to providing the need for cooperatives, micro, small, and medium enterprises for the marketing of their products.

The course Social Entrepreneurship and Management was first offered at the University of Asia and the Pacific School of Management in 2000. This course was developed and taught by Dr. Jose Rene C. Gayo, then the Dean of the School of Management. It was offered as an elective for the senior students of the Bachelor of Science in Entrepreneurial Management. In March 2001, the university held a seminar called Social Enterprises: Creating Wealth for the Poor.

One social enterprise in the Philippines is GKonomics International, Inc., a non-stock, non-profit organisation incorporated in 2009. They are a Gawad Kalinga partner in social enterprise development aiming to build a new generation of producers.

=== South Korea ===
The majority of Korean social enterprises are primarily concerned with job creation. The Social Enterprise Promotion Act was approved in December 2006 and put into effect in July 2007. It was amended in 2010. Article 2 defines a social enterprise as "an organization which is engaged in business activities of producing and selling goods and services while pursuing a social purpose of enhancing the quality of local residents' life" by providing social services and battling job scarcity. These social services include "education, health, social welfare, environment and culture and other service proportionate to this". The Ministry of Labor establishes a Basic Plan for Social Enterprises Support every five years, as decreed in Article 5. Enterprises, cooperatives, and non-profits can all be recognised as social enterprises, which are eligible for tax reduction and/or financial supports from the national, provincial, or local governments. 680 entities were recognised as social enterprises as of October 2012. The Korea Social Enterprise Promotion Agency was established to promote social enterprises, which include Happynarae and Beautiful Store.

=== Thailand ===
In Thailand, social entrepreneurship is small but growing. Thammasat University in Bangkok is the Southeast Asia partner of the Global Social Venture Competition (GSVC-SEA). Every year, emerging social enterprises present their business models, which range from agriculture to technology, tourism and education. In 2013, the winners of GSVC-SEA were Wedu Global and the agricultural organisation CSA Munching box. The government of Thailand supports the creation of new social enterprises via the Thai Social Entrepreneurship office (TSEO). The Royal Family became involved in social entrepreneurship through brand creations such as the Mae Fah Luang Foundation's Doi Tung.

Major social enterprises in Thailand include ChangeFusion, led by the Ashoka Fellow Sunit Shrestha; Singha Park Chiangrai, which hired 1200 local unemployed people; and Mechai Viravaidya's Population and Community Development Association (PDA).

== Central/South America ==
=== Chile ===
Social enterprises in Chile adopt various forms, like cooperatives, associations, private limited companies or corporations. The Ministry of Economy developed a legal form used to establish the rights and duties for social enterprises. Chile's Productivity, Innovation and Growth Agenda, which has 47 measures, 10 bills and 37 administrative initiatives, invested US$1.5 million into programmes to support social enterprises between 2014 and 2018. The Chilean government's Chilean Economic Development Agency (CORFO) initiative helped implement programmes like the Social Innovation Program and the Seed Subsidy for Flexible Asignation to Support Social Innovation Start-up Program, both of which have provided seed capital to incubators supporting social entrepreneurs. The Ministry of Social Development also promoted grant-matching funds, like Más por Chile and Incubia Fund to support the development programmes aiming to reduce poverty and strengthen youth.

== Europe ==
=== Definition ===
The European research network, EMES, uses a more Weberian 'ideal type' definition for social enterprises, rather than a prescriptive definition. This relies on nine criteria in two categories:

- Economic criteria:
  - Continuous production and/or sale of goods and services (rather than predominantly advisory or grant-giving functions)
  - High level of autonomy from public authorities or private companies, even if they may benefit from grants and donations. Their members have the right to participate ('voice') and to leave the organisation ('exit').
  - Significant economic risk dependent on the efforts of their members
  - Minimum number of paid workers
- Social criteria:
  - Explicit aim of community benefit, including the promotion of a sense of social responsibility at the local level
  - Citizen initiative
  - Decision-making not based on capital ownership
  - Participatory character, involving those affected by the activity. In many cases, one of the objectives is to strengthen democracy at local level through economic activity.
  - Limited distribution of profit to avoid profit-maximising behaviour

Meanwhile, as part of its Social Business Initiative, which ran from 2011 until 2014, the European Commission developed its own definition based on three key criteria: social objective, limited profit distribution, and participatory governance. Here, social enterprises are defined as "an operator in the social economy whose main objective is to have a social impact rather than make a profit for their owners or shareholders". It uses entrepreneurship and innovation to provide and market goods and services, and uses its profits primarily to achieve social objectives. Additionally, it is "managed in an open and responsible manner and, in particular, involve[s] employees, consumers and stakeholders affected by its commercial activities".

The Commission uses the term 'social enterprise' to cover the following types of business:

- Those for which the social or societal objective of the common good is the reason for the commercial activity, often in the form of a high level of social innovation
- Those where profits are mainly reinvested with a view to achieving this social objective
- Those where the method of organisation or ownership system reflects their mission, using democratic or participatory principles or focusing on social justice

This definition is inclusive of businesses providing social services and/or goods and services to vulnerable persons (access to housing, health care, assistance for elderly or disabled persons, inclusion of vulnerable groups, child care, access to employment and training, dependency management, etc.); and of businesses with a method of production of goods or services with a social objective (social and professional integration via access to employment for people disadvantaged in particular by insufficient qualifications or social or professional problems leading to exclusion and marginalisation) but whose activity may be outside the realm of the provision of social goods or services.

=== Czech Republic ===
In the Czech Republic, a working party stemming from the development partnerships in the EQUAL programme agreed on specific distinctions in April 2008. They defined social entrepreneurship as an organisation that "develops independent business activities and is active on the market in order to solve issues of employment, social coherence and local development. Its activities support solidarity, social inclusion and growth of social capital mainly on local level with the maximum respect of sustainable development." This includes complementary activities of NGOs destined to reinvest profit into the main public benefit activity of an organisation. The group stipulated that the broad definition of social entrepreneurship should not be directly bound to legal benefits and financial support because the concept of social entrepreneurship might be threatened by misuse and disintegration. Conditions of eventual legal and financial support should be discussed by experts. The legal form a social enterprise takes may not always be seen as important, however, they must be subject to private law. According to the existing legal system, they can function in a form of cooperatives, civic associations, public benefit associations, church legal entities, Ltd., stock companies, and sole traders. Budgetary organisations and municipalities are not social enterprises as they are not autonomous, but parts of public administration.

These definitions stem from the four basic principles the group believes should be followed by social enterprises. These standards were settled as the minimum so that they should be observed by all legal entities and all types of social enterprises. Specific types of enterprises that are undergoing pilot verification within CIP EQUAL projects and that are already functioning in the Czech Republic are social firms employing seriously disadvantaged target groups, and municipal social cooperatives as a suitable form of entrepreneurship with the view of development of local communities and microregions. A social economy is a "complex of autonomous private activities realised by different types of organisations that have the aim to serve their members or local community first of all by doing business". They tend to focus on solving issues of unemployment, social coherence and local development, and pour any profit back into the community. Social economies are created and developed using the triple bottom line. Citizens are encouraged to become involved and internal relations stress the inclusion of members and/or employees in decision-making and self-management.

=== Finland ===
In Finland, a law was passed in 2004 that defines a social enterprise (sosiaalinen yritys) as any sort of enterprise that is entered on the relevant register and at least 30% of whose employees are disabled or long-term unemployed. As of March 2007, 91 such enterprises had been registered, the largest with 50 employees. In the UK, the more specific term "social firm" is used to distinguish such "integration enterprises". This legal definition of a social enterprise made it difficult for actual social entrepreneurship to enter the Finnish consciousness and public debate, so a new term, yhteiskunnallinen yrittäjyys (societal entrepreneurship), was dubbed and promoted by the early players in the field. Nowadays, the term is recognised, accepted and even promoted by entrepreneurial NGOs, entrepreneurs themselves, co-operatives, and government organisations. The Finnish Social Enterprise Research Network (FinSERN) collects and exchanges national and international research data, maintains connections with social enterprise researchers and research networks around the world, and finds financing opportunities for research. There is also a growing interest in impact investment in Finland.

=== Italy ===
Italy passed a law in 2005 on imprese sociali, to which the government has given form and definition by Legislative Decree no. 155, dated 24 March 2006. Under Italian law, a social enterprise is a private entity that provides social utility goods and services, acting for the common interest and not for profit.

In an effort to develop social enterprises and measure social impact, the Italian governmental work placement agency, Italia Lavoro, has developed a method to calculate the social efficiency of their project, from an economic point of view. For example, they measure the economic value to the society of providing a job to a disabled person. Since 1997, Italia Lavoro has provided work placements to people with health problems or mental and physical disabilities and to those who are socially disadvantaged. To this aim, they help people who have fallen through the cracks of the general work system to reintegrate themselves into society through the creation of small and medium non-profit enterprises.

Also intended to generate more social enterprises is the non-profit cooperative Make a Change, which provides financial, operational and management support to social start-ups. In 2010, they organised the first edition of a contest to elect the Social Entrepreneur of the Year. This year's winner was the social cooperative Cauto, which manages the entire trash life-cycle in the Province of Brescia. One-third of Cauto's workers are disabled or disadvantaged. Another of Make a Change's contests is called The World's Most Beautiful Job. In 2010, the Tavern of the Good and Bad project by Domus de luna from Cagliari won the competition. The tavern employs mums and children recently graduated from rehabilitation programmes. The prize consisted of a grant of €30,000 and 12 months of professional consulting and support. The awards ceremony was included in the programme of the Global Entrepreneurship Week.

=== Spain ===
Empresas de inserción are a type of social enterprise in Spain.

=== United Kingdom ===
In the UK, the accepted definition of social enterprise is a "business with primarily social objectives whose surpluses are principally reinvested for that purpose". This definition comes from the 2002 Department of Trade and Industry report Social Enterprise: a strategy for success and is used by sector bodies such as Social Enterprise UK and Social Enterprise Mark CIC. In the British context, social enterprises include community enterprises, credit unions, trading arms of charities, employee-owned businesses, co-operatives, development trusts, housing associations, social firms, and leisure trusts. Whereas conventional businesses distribute their profit among shareholders, in social enterprises the surplus tends to go towards one or more social aims which the business has – for example, education for the poor, vocational training for disabled people, environmental issues or for animal rights, although this may not always be the case. Social enterprises are often seen as distinct from charities and from private sector companies with policies on corporate social responsibility. An emerging view, however, is that social enterprise is a particular type of trading activity that sometimes gives rise to distinct organisation forms reflecting a commitment to social cause working with stakeholders from more than one sector of the economy. Following broad consultation, the UK's Social Enterprise Unit adopted a broader definition which is independent of any legal model. This latitudinarian definition could include not only companies limited by guarantee and industrial and provident societies but also companies limited by shares, unincorporated associations, partnerships, and sole traders.

Freer Spreckley and Cliff Southcombe established the first specialist support organisation in the UK Social Enterprise Partnership Ltd. in March 1997. They identified three common characteristics of social enterprises:

- Enterprise orientation: They are directly involved in producing goods or providing services to a market. They seek to be viable trading organisations, with an operating surplus.
- Social aims: They have explicit social aims such as job creation, training or the provision of local services. They have ethical values including a commitment to local capacity building, and they are accountable to their members and the wider community for their social environmental and economic impact.
- Social ownership: They are autonomous organisations with governance and ownership structures based on participation by stakeholder groups (users or clients, local community groups, etc.) or by trustees. Profits are distributed as profit sharing to stakeholders or used for the benefit of the community.

The UK has also developed a legal form called the community interest company (CIC). CICs are a type of limited company designed specifically for those wishing to operate for the benefit of the community rather than for the benefit of the owners of the company. This means that a CIC cannot be formed or used solely for the personal gain of a particular person, or group of people. Legislation caps the level of dividends payable at 35% of profits and returns to individuals are capped at 4% above the bank base rate. CICs can be limited by shares, or by guarantee, and have a statutory "asset lock" to prevent the assets and profits being distributed, except as permitted by legislation. This ensures the assets and profits are retained within the CIC for community purposes, or transferred to another asset-locked organisation, such as another CIC or charity. A CIC cannot be formed to support political activities and a company that is a charity cannot be a CIC, unless it gives up its charitable status. However, a charity may apply to register a CIC as a subsidiary company.

Another type of social enterprise category in the UK is a social firm, a business set up specifically to create employment for people otherwise severely disadvantaged in the labour market.

Organisations

A survey conducted for the Social Enterprise Unit in 2004 found that there were 15,000 social enterprises in the UK (counting only those that were incorporated as companies limited by guarantee or industrial and provident societies). This is 1.2% of all enterprises in the UK. They employed 450,000 people, of whom two-thirds were full-time, plus a further 300,000 volunteers. Their combined annual turnover is £18 billion, and the median turnover is £285,000. Of this, 84% is from trading. In 2006, the government revised this estimate upwards to 55,000, based on a survey of a sample of owners of businesses with employees, which found that 5% defined themselves as social enterprises. A 2013 estimates suggested that there were approximately 68,000 social enterprises in the UK, contributing £24 billion to the UK economy. Using the EU definition of social economy, the annual contribution of social enterprises to the UK economy is four times larger, at £98 billion, because it includes the contribution of all co-operatives, mutuals and associations that produce goods or services to improve human well-being.

British social enterprises include Belu Water, The Big Issue, Divine Chocolate, Cafédirect, Camara, The Co-operative Group, Eden Project, Fairfield Materials Management Ltd, HCT Group, John Lewis Partnership, Kitty's Launderette, Launch It, London Symphony Orchestra, Skoll Centre for Social Entrepreneurship, Technology Trust, Two Fingers Brewing Co., and Welsh Water.

Bodies

The first agency in the UK, Social Enterprise London (SEL), was established in 1998 following collaboration between bodies supporting co-operative enterprise. It worked with the London Development Agency (LDA) to establish both an undergraduate degree in social enterprise at the University of East London and a Social Enterprise Journal, which is now managed by Liverpool John Moores University. SEL built a network of over 2,000 social enterprises and social entrepreneurs, directly brokered over 500 social enterprise jobs under the Department for Work and Pensions's Future Jobs Fund, and delivers consultancy and business support across the world. SEL is just one arm of the national Social Enterprise UK (SEUK), which liaises with similar groups in each region of England, as well as in Northern Ireland, Scotland, and Wales.

Social Enterprise Mark CIC was the accreditation and standards body responsible for what was previously the only internationally available social enterprise accreditation, the Social Enterprise Mark and Social Enterprise Gold Mark. It existed to recognise and promote the capabilities of social enterprises as competitive, sustainable businesses, dedicated to maximising social impact above shareholder profit. It ensured the social enterprise business model remained ethical, credible, and commercial through accreditation. More than 200 organisations held the Social Enterprise Mark/Gold Mark accreditation.

In 2002, the National Council for Voluntary Organisations (NCVO) established the Sustainable Funding Project. Using funds from Futurebuilders England, Centrica, and Charity Bank, this project promoted the concept of sustainability through trading to voluntary groups and charities. From 2005 onward, NCVO began using the term social enterprise to refer to voluntary sector trading activities.

In 2002, the British government launched a unified Social Enterprise Strategy and established a Social Enterprise Unit (SEnU) to co-ordinate its implementation in England and Wales, primarily to consult on a new type of company to support social enterprise development. The SEnU was initially established within the Department of Trade and Industry (DTI), and in 2006 became part of the newly created Office of the Third Sector, under the wing of the Cabinet Office. After a consultation, the SEnU found that policy development was increasingly influenced by organisations in the conventional "non-profit" sector rather than those with their origins in employee-ownership and co-operative sectors. The 2003 DTI report on the consultation shows the disproportionate influence of charitable trusts and umbrella organisations in the voluntary sector, and evidence now exists that the voices of progressive employee-owned organisations were marginalised in the course of producing the report. In April 2012, Prime Minister David Cameron launched Big Society Capital, the world's first social investment wholesaler. Capitalised with a total of £600 million, it was built to distribute funds to intermediaries that will lend money to social enterprises, charities, and community groups.

In 2012, Social Enterprise UK ran the 'Not In Our Name' campaign against Salesforce.com, a global software and CRM company that had begun using the term 'social enterprise' to describe its products and had applied for 'social enterprise' trademarks in the EU, US, Australia, and Jamaica. The campaign was supported by similar organisations in the US (the Social Enterprise Alliance), Canada, South Africa, and Australia. An open letter was sent to the CEO and Chairman of Salesforce.com asking Salesforce.com to stop using the term 'social enterprise'. It was signed by people and organisations around the world, including Muhammad Yunus, Richard G. Wilkinson, and Kate Pickett. Salesforce said it would withdraw applications to trademark the term 'social enterprise', and remove any references to 'social enterprise' in its marketing materials in the future.

==== Scotland ====
In Scotland, social enterprise is a devolved function and is part of the remit of the Scottish Government. Activities are coordinated by the Scottish Social Enterprise Coalition, and intellectual leadership is provided by the Social Enterprise Institute at Heriot-Watt University in Edinburgh, established under the directorship of Declan Jones. SENScot, based in Edinburgh, supports social entrepreneurs through a variety of activities, including a weekly email bulletin by co-founder Lawrence Demarco. The Social Enterprise Academy "deliver[s] leadership, enterprise, and social impact programmes" throughout Scotland, and further support is provided by Development Trusts Association Scotland and Co-operative Development Scotland.

== Middle East ==
There is no separate legal entity for, or proper definition of, social enterprises in the Middle East. Most social enterprises register as companies or non-profit organisations. However, social enterprises in the Middle East are active and innovating in a variety of sectors and industries. A majority of the existing social enterprises are engaged in human capital development and are training leaders with the experiences and skills needed to enhance the region's global competitiveness and social goals. These include the growing interest among youth in achieving social impact and growth in volunteerism among youth.

Among the social entrepreneurs listed on the Schwab Foundation's website whose work impacted the Middle Eastern in 2013 were Mohammad Abbad Andaloussi (Morocco), Ibrahim Abouleish (Egypt), Eli Beer (Israel), Ron Bruder (United States), Jim Fruchterman (United States), Essma Ben Hamida (Tunisia), Laila Iskander (Egypt), Wendy Kopp (United States), Roy Prosterman (United States), Linda Rottenberg (United States), Soraya Salti (Jordan), Tom Szaky (Canada), and Yuval Wagner (Israel).

== North America ==
=== Canada ===
The Social Enterprise Council of Canada (SECC) defines social enterprises as "businesses owned by nonprofit organizations, that is directly involved in the production and/or selling of goods and services for the blended purpose of generating income and achieving social, cultural, and/or environmental aims. Social enterprises are one more tool for non-profits to use to meet their mission to contribute to healthy communities." Canadian social enterprise characteristics vary by region and province in the ways they differentiate social enterprises from other types of businesses, not-for-profits, co-operatives, and government agencies. Significant regional differences in legislation, financing, support agencies and corporate structures can be seen across Canada as a result of different historical development paths in the social economy.

Social enterprises may directly address social needs through their products and services, the number of people they employ, or the use of their financial surplus. This can distinguish them from "socially responsible for-profit businesses", which create positive social change indirectly through the practice of corporate social responsibility (e.g., creating and implementing a charitable foundation; paying fair wages to their employees; using environmentally friendly raw materials; providing volunteers to help with community projects). Social enterprises may use earned revenue strategies to pursue a double or triple bottom line, either alone (as a social economy business, in either the private or the not-for-profit sector) or as a significant part of a not-for-profit corporation's mixed income stream that may include charitable contributions and public sector assistance. This distinguishes them from some traditional not-for-profit corporations, which may rely in whole or part on charitable and government support.

Habitat for Humanity ReStore, Eva's Print Shop, and ME to WE are some well-known social enterprises operating in Canada.

=== United States ===
The Social Enterprise Alliance defines social enterprises as "organizations that address a basic unmet need or solve a social or environmental problem through a market-driven approach". In the U.S., two distinct characteristics differentiate social enterprises from other types of businesses, non-profits, and government agencies:

- Social enterprises directly address social needs through their products and services or through the numbers of disadvantaged people they employ
- Social enterprises use earned revenue strategies to pursue a double or triple bottom line, either alone or as part of a non-profit's mixed revenue stream. The double bottom line consists of social goals and profit maximisation. Here, the two are not contradictory; however, proper financial management to achieve positive profits is necessary in order to undertake the organisations social goals. The triple bottom line is essentially the double bottom line, with the addition of environmental sustainability. It focuses on economic vitality, environmental sustainability, and social responsibility.

In the U.S., a social enterprise is distinct from social entrepreneurship, which broadly encompasses such diverse players as B-Corp companies, socially responsible investors, "for-benefit" ventures, Fourth Sector organisations, CSR efforts by major corporations, "social innovators," and others. All these types of entities grapple with social needs in a variety of ways, but, unless they directly address social needs through their products or services or the numbers of disadvantaged people they employ, they do not qualify as social enterprises. According to a paper published by De Gruyter in 2019, some common challenges facing social enterprises in the U.S. include legal form, governance challenges, difficulties in measuring impact, lack of clear identity, problems in accessing capital, and management tensions.

Society Profits offers third-party accreditation to social enterprise businesses.

== Oceania ==
=== Australia ===
In Australia, a social enterprise is a business that exists specifically to "make the world a better place". The Social Enterprise National Strategy (SENS) project was started in 2020 with the aim of developing the country's "first social enterprise strategy and [to] secure Federal Government support for its implementation". The group's advisory committee included the Australian Centre for Rural Entrepreneurship (ACRE), Social Enterprise Network Victoria (SENVIC), Social Traders, the South Australian Social Enterprise Council, YLab, Good Cycles and the English Family Foundation (EFF). Their work resulted in the foundation of Social Enterprise Australia in February 2022. This organisation was intended to "facilitate and lead the development of a national strategy" for social enterprise. Its mission was framed around "environmental care, people-centred services, access to decent work, and community-led innovation". A 2022 report by SENS showed that there were more than 12,000 social enterprises operating in Australia, employing more than 206,000 people and making a sum contribution of $21.3 billion to the economy.

In 2017, the Centre for Social Impact at Swinburne University undertook a comprehensive mapping project of social enterprise in Victoria. The report identified 3,500 social enterprises in Victoria alone, employing over 60,000 people, or 1.8% of the state's workforce. Victoria's social enterprises contributed over $5.2 billion in gross output to the state's economy. 20% of Victoria's social enterprise workforce in 2017 was people with disability (i.e., 12,000 jobs) and 7% of jobs were held by people previously experiencing long-term unemployment.

Social Enterprise Australia's People and Planet First initiative offers "global verification," which identifies social enterprises as affordable and sustainable.

== See also ==
- Bottom of the pyramid
- Citizen enterprise
- Corporate social entrepreneurship
- Impact investing
- List of social enterprises
- Micro-enterprise
- MicroConsignment
- Mutualism (economic theory)
- Social venture capital

== Sources ==
- Aiken, Mike (2010). "Taking the Long View: Conceptualizing the challenges facing UK third sector organisations in the social and welfare field". In Evers, Adalbert; Zimmer, Annette (eds.). Turbulent environments: The impact of commercialization on organisational legitimacy and the quality of services. Baden-Baden: Nomos Publishing.
- Billis, David (2010). Hybrid Organizations in the Third Sector. Basingstoke: Palgrave MacMillan.
- Gergen, Christopher; Vanourek, Gregg (2008). Life Entrepreneurs: Ordinary People Creating Extraordinary Lives. Jossey-Bass. ISBN 978-0-787-98862-3.
- Lynch, Kevin; Walls, Julius (2009). Mission, Inc.: The Practitioner's Guide to Social Enterprise. Berrett-Koehler Publishers. ISBN 9781576754795.
- Nyssens, Marthe, ed. (2006). Social Enterprises in Europe: Between Market, Public Policies and Communities. London: Routledge. ISBN 9780415378796.
- Pearce, John (1993). At the Heart of the Community Economy. London: Calouste Gulbenkian Foundation. ISBN 9780903319638.
- Spear, Roger (2001). "11. United Kingdom: Labour Market Integration and Employment Creation". In Spear, Roger; Defourney, Jacques; Favreau, Louis; Laville, Jean-Louis (eds.). Tackling Social Exclusion in Europe. Aldershot: Ashgate.
- Spreckley, Freer (2011). "Social Enterprise Planning Toolkit" (PDF). The British Council.
- Woodin, Tom; Crook, David; Carpentier, Vincent (2010). Community and Mutual Ownership: A historical review. York: Joseph Rowntree Foundation.
- Wyler, Steve (2009). A History of Community Asset Ownership. London: Development Trusts Association. ISBN 9780956359704.
