= Ole Kassow =

Ole Kassow may refer to:

- Ole Kassow (rower) (born 1935), Danish rower
- Ole Kassow (social entrepreneur) (born 1966), Danish social entrepreneur
