= Kassow (disambiguation) =

Kassow is a municipality in Germany.

Kassow may also refer to:

- Ole Kassow (rower) (born 1935), Danish rower
- Ole Kassow (social entrepreneur) (born 1966), Danish social entrepreneur
- Samuel Kassow (born 1946), American historian

== See also ==
- Kassowal, Pakistan
