= Entrenched clause =

Part of a constitution that restricts amendments

An entrenched clause or entrenchment clause of a constitution is a provision that makes certain amendments either more difficult or impossible to pass. Overriding an entrenched clause may require a supermajority, a referendum, or the consent of the minority party. The term eternity clause is used in a similar manner in the constitutions of Brazil, the Czech Republic, Germany, Greece, India, Iran, Italy, Morocco, Norway, and Turkey, but specifically applies to an entrenched clause that can never be overridden. However, if a constitution provides for a mechanism of its own abolition or replacement, like the German Basic Law does in Article 146, this by necessity provides a "back door" for getting rid of the "eternity clause", too.

Any amendment to a constitution that would not satisfy the prerequisites enshrined in a valid entrenched clause would lead to so-called "unconstitutional constitutional law"—that is, an amendment to constitutional law text that appears constitutional by its form, albeit unconstitutional due to the procedure used to enact it or due to the content of its provisions.

Entrenched clauses are, in some cases, seen as justified as protecting the rights of a minority from the dangers of majoritarianism. In other cases, the objective may be to prevent amendments to the constitution that would pervert the fundamental principles it enshrines. However, entrenched clauses are often challenged by their opponents as being undemocratic.

== Africa ==
=== Algeria ===
The Algerian Constitution of 2016 contains clauses about the term limit and the duration of the presidential term.

=== Egypt ===
Article 226 of the Constitution of Egypt, defining the amendment procedure, ends with an entrenched clause stating that "In all cases, texts pertaining to the re-election of the president of the republic or the principles of freedom and equality stipulated in this Constitution may not be amended, unless the amendment brings more guarantees."

The Tahrir Institute for Middle East Policy suggested that the 2019 constitutional amendments extending president Abdel Fattah el-Sisi's term from four to six years and allowing him to run for a third consecutive term were in violation of this article.

=== Morocco ===
In the Constitution of Morocco, eternity clauses exist that ensure certain provisions cannot be amended, including the role of Islam in the nation's law, and the role of the king of Morocco in law.

=== South Africa ===
There are several examples of entrenched clauses that ultimately failed in their objectives, since their protections were undermined in unintended ways. For instance, the South Africa Act 1909, the initial constitution of the Union of South Africa, contained entrenchment clauses protecting voting rights in the Cape Province, including those of some Coloureds, that required two-thirds of a joint session of parliament to be repealed. The Coloureds, however, later lost their voting rights after the Government restructured the Senate and packed it with its sympathisers so that they were able to achieve said supermajority in what is known as the Coloured vote constitutional crisis.

=== Tunisia ===
The Tunisian Constitution of 2014 prohibits amending the constitution to change the duration of a presidential term or the maximum number of terms an individual can serve.

== Americas ==
=== Brazil ===
Entrenched clauses of the Constitution of Brazil are listed in Article 60, Paragraph 4:

No proposal of amendment shall be considered which is aimed at abolishing:

1. the federative form of State;
2. the direct, secret, universal and periodic vote;
3. the separation of the Government Powers;
4. individual rights and guarantees.

There are other clauses that implicitly cannot be amended, mostly because they are dependent of the subjects above.

=== Canada ===
The amendment formula for the Constitution of Canada (sections 38–49 of the Constitution Act, 1982) contains multiple levels of entrenchment, but the issues most firmly entrenched (which can only be changed by the federal government with the unanimous consent of all provinces) under section 41 are the monarchy, each province's minimum allocation of representatives in Parliament, English-French bilingualism, the composition of the Supreme Court of Canada, and section 41 itself.

=== Honduras ===
The Constitution of Honduras has an article stating that the article itself and certain other articles cannot be changed in any circumstances. Article 374 of the Honduras Constitution asserts this unmodifiability, stating, "It is not possible to reform, in any case, the preceding article, the present article, the constitutional articles referring to the form of government, to the national territory, to the presidential period, the prohibition to serve again as President of the Republic, the citizen who has performed under any title in consequence of which she/he cannot be President of the Republic in the subsequent period." This unmodifiable article played an important role in the 2009 Honduran constitutional crisis.

=== United States ===
Article V of the United States Constitution temporarily shielded certain clauses in Article I from being amended. The first clause in Section 9, which prevented Congress from passing any law that would restrict the importation of slaves prior to 1808, and the fourth clause in that same section, a declaration that direct taxes must be apportioned according to the state populations, were explicitly shielded from constitutional amendment prior to 1808.

Article V also shields the first clause of Article I, Section 3, which provides for equal representation of the states in the United States Senate, from being amended. This has been interpreted to require unanimous ratification of any amendment altering the composition of the Senate. However, the text of the clause would indicate that the size of the Senate could be changed by an ordinary amendment if each state continued to have equal representation. Alternatively, Article V theoretically could be amended to remove such an entrenched clause designation, and then the clause could be amended itself.

The Crittenden Compromise and Corwin Amendment, both proposed in the months leading up to the Civil War but never passed, would have enshrined slavery in the Constitution and prevented Congress from interfering with it.

== Asia and Oceania ==
=== Australia ===
As Australian Parliaments have inherited the British principle of parliamentary sovereignty, they may not entrench themselves by a regular act. Therefore, the entrenchment of the national flag in the Flags Act of 1953 is without force as the entrenchment clause could be removed (through normal legislative amendment) by later parliaments.

The Commonwealth Constitution is entrenched as it may only be amended by referendum; the amendment must gain the support of a majority of Australian voters nationwide, plus a majority of voters in a majority of states. These provisions are specified in section 128. The Imperial Parliament's power to amend it in Australian law was limited by the Statute of Westminster Adoption Act 1942 and terminated by the Australia Act 1986.

State laws respecting the constitution, powers or procedure of the parliament of a state need to follow any restrictions specified in state law on such acts, by virtue of section 6 of the Australia Act. This power does not extend to the whole constitution of the state, and the Parliament of Queensland has ignored entrenchments in amending its constitution. Consequently, it is possible that the entrenchment clauses are not entrenchable, preventing state law from having effectively entrenching clauses.

=== India ===
The Supreme Court in 1973 has developed the basic structure doctrine which holds that certain features of the constitution are fundamental in nature and cannot be modified through parliamentary amendment. The Supreme Court defined the constituents of the components of the basic structure as

1. Supremacy of the Constitution
2. Republicanism & democratic system
3. Secularism
4. Separation of powers
5. Federalism
6. Mandate to build a welfare state
7. Right to individual freedoms
8. Manitainance of the unity & sovereignty of the country.

=== Indonesia ===
Article 37 on Chapter 16 of the Constitution of Indonesia governs the constitutional amendment procedure, yet it also specifies that the status of Indonesia as a unitary state is unmodifiable. The Ministry of Home Affairs, the Ministry of Defense as well as the Ministry of Foreign Affairs is also stated within the Constitution to not be dissolvable.

Empowered by Article 2(3) of the Constitution, People's Consultative Assembly (MPR) has passed several Resolutions of the People's Consultative Assembly (TAP MPR) that lies below the Constitution and over Laws (Undang-Undang). The assembly has through Resolution number II/MPR/2003 renounced its own ability to enact further resolutions other than those specified in that Resolution. Article 24C of the Constitution gives the Constitutional Court power to test constitutionality of Laws against Constitution, but did not express the same power to assess TAP MPR. Therefore, under current constitutional order, any remaining previous Resolutions is regarded as entrenched laws.

=== Iran ===
The final Article of the Constitution of the Islamic Republic of Iran, Art. 177, ensures that particular aspects of the Constitution are unalterable. These include the Islamic character of the government and laws, the objectives of the republic, the democratic character of the government, "the absolute wilayat al-'amr and the leadership of the Ummah", the administration of the country by referendum, and the role of Islam as the state religion.

=== Malaysia ===
Another example of entrenchment would be the entrenching of portions of the Malaysian Constitution related to the Malaysian social contract, which specifies that citizenship be granted to the substantial Chinese and Indian immigrant populations in return for the recognition of a special position for the indigenous Malay majority. The Constitution did not initially contain an entrenched clause; indeed, one of the articles later entrenched, Article 153, was initially intended to be subject to a sunset clause. However, after the May 13 incident of racial rioting in 1969, Parliament passed the Constitution (Amendment) Act 1971. The Act permitted criminalisation of the questioning of Articles 152, 153, 181, and Part III of the Constitution.

Article 152 designates the Malay language as the national language of Malaysia; Article 153 grants the Malays special privileges; Article 181 covers the position of the Malay rulers; and Part III deals with matters of citizenship. The restrictions, which even covered Members of Parliament, made the repeal of these sections of the Constitution unamendable or repealable by de facto; however, to entrench them further, the Act also amended Article 159(5), which covers Constitutional amendments, to prohibit the amending of the aforementioned Articles, as well as Article 159(5), without the consent of the Conference of Rulers — a non-elected body comprising the rulers of the Malay states and the governors of the other states.

=== New Zealand ===
Section 268 of the Electoral Act (part of the constitution of New Zealand) declares that the law governing the maximum term of Parliament, along with certain provisions of the Electoral Act relating to the redistribution of electoral boundaries, the voting age, and the secret ballot, may only be altered either by three-quarters of the entire membership of the House of Representatives, or by a majority of valid votes in a popular referendum.

However, Section 268 is not itself protected by this provision, so a government could legally repeal Section 268 and go on to alter the entrenched portions of law, both with a simple majority in Parliament.

=== Sri Lanka ===
In Sri Lanka, the Constitution includes entrenched provisions that require both a two-thirds majority in Parliament and a nationwide referendum for amendment. These entrenched provisions, specified in Article 83 of the Constitution, include the following:

- Articles safeguarding the unitary state (Article 2), sovereignty of the people (Article 3), freedom of religion and thought (Articles 9, 10, and 11), and symbols of the nation such as the national flag and anthem (Articles 6, 7, and 8).
- Provisions related to the term limits of the President (Article 30(2)) and the duration of Parliament (Article 62(2)), but only when these limits are extended to over six years. If these terms are shortened, a referendum is not required.
- Article 83 itself, which governs the requirement for a referendum for amending these entrenched provisions.

=== Turkey ===
Article 4 of the Constitution of Turkey prohibits the first three articles from being amended or becoming the subject of a proposed amendment. The three articles are as follows:

- Article 1: specifying the Turkish state as a republic;
- Article 2: characterizing the republic as "a democratic, secular and social state governed by rule of law, within the notions of public peace, national solidarity and justice, respecting human rights, loyal to the nationalism of Atatürk, and based on the fundamental tenets set forth in the preamble;
- Article 3: establishing Turkish as the official language, the design of the national flag, İstiklal Marşı as the national anthem, and Ankara as the capital.

== Europe ==
=== Bosnia and Herzegovina ===
Article X of the Constitution of Bosnia and Herzegovina, defining the amendment procedure, provides in paragraph 2 that the rights and freedoms as established in Article II of the Constitution may not be eliminated or diminished, and that the paragraph 2 itself may not be altered.

=== Czech Republic ===
Article 9 of the Czech Constitution, which concerns supplementing and amending the Constitution, states that "the substantive requisites of the democratic, law-abiding State may not be amended". This provision was invoked in 2009 when the Constitutional Court of the Czech Republic struck down a Constitutional Act adopted to invoke a one-off early legislative election. The disputed Act was judged to be an individual decision in violation of then-effective constitutional procedure regulating early elections.

The Constitution also contains an explicit eternity clause whereby the Constitutional Court is the ultimate arbiter of the effect of European law on the Constitution.

=== Estonia ===
Article 1 of Estonian Constitution states that "The independence and sovereignty of Estonia are timeless and inalienable." As part of Chapter 1 of the Constitution, this provision may only be changed by a referendum (and such a referendum could only be organized after obtaining a 3/5 supermajority in the parliament). This provision, however, does not prevent Estonia from being a member of the European Union and delegating some of its decision-making power to central EU institutions as long as "fundamental constitutional principles" are not breached (according to the special Constitution Amendment Act passed on a referendum in 2003).

=== France ===
The French Constitution states in Title XVI, Article 89, On Amendments to the Constitution, "The republican form of government shall not be the object of any amendment" thus forbidding the restoration of the monarchy or the empire.

=== Germany ===
The German eternity clause (German: Ewigkeitsklausel) is Article 79 paragraph (3) of the Basic Law for the Federal Republic of Germany (German: Grundgesetz). The eternity clause establishes that certain fundamental principles of Germany's democracy can never be removed, even by parliament. The fundamental principles, (i.e., "the basic principles" of Articles 1 and 20), are as follows:

- Duty of all state authority: "The dignity of man is inviolable. To respect and protect it is the duty of all state authority." (Article 1)
- Acknowledgement of human rights: "The German people therefore acknowledge inviolable and inalienable human rights as the basis of every community, of peace and of justice in the world." (Article 1 Paragraph 2)
- Directly enforceable law: "The following basic rights bind the legislature, the executive and judiciary as directly enforceable law." (Article 1 Paragraph 3)
- Republic (form of government): (Article 20 Paragraph 1)
- Federal state (Länder): (Article 20 Paragraph 1)
- Social state (welfare state): (Article 20 Paragraph 1)
- Sovereignty of the People: "All state authority emanates from the People." (Article 20 Paragraph 2)
- Democratic: "All state authority is exercised by the people by means of elections and voting and by specific legislative, executive and judicial organs." (Article 20 Paragraph 2)
- Rule of law (Rechtsstaat): "Legislation is subject to the constitutional order. The executive and judiciary are bound by the law." (Article 20 Paragraph 3)
- Separation of powers: "Specific legislative, executive and judicial organs", each "bound by the law". (Article 20 Paragraphs 2–3)

The original purpose of this eternity clause was to ensure that the establishment of any dictatorship in Germany would be clearly illegal; in legal practice the clause was used by plaintiffs at the Federal Constitutional Court challenging constitutional amendments that affected Articles 1, 10, 19, 101, and 103 regarding restrictions of legal recourse. Although these basic principles are protected from being repealed, their particular expression may still be amended, such as to clarify, extend or refine an entrenched principle.

The Parlamentarischer Rat (Parliamentary Council) included the eternity clause in its Basic Law specifically to prevent a new "legal" pathway to a dictatorship as was the case in the Weimar Republic with the Enabling Act of 1933 and Article 48 of the Weimar Constitution.

It is not lawful for any political party, any legislation or any national commitment to violate "the basic principles" of "this Basic Law" laid down in Articles 1 and 20. Furthermore, the only way that Articles 1 and 20 can be removed is through Article 146, which requires "a constitution that is adopted by a free decision of the German People". So long as the principles of Articles 1 and 20 are retained, they may be amended (as Article 20 has indeed been amended to establish a 'right of resistance'), but the full protection of the eternity clause does not extend to such amendments.

Unlike the Weimar Constitution, which made human rights only an objective, the eternity clause and Articles 1 and 20 make specific demands of "all state authority" regarding "human rights" (that is, "the basic rights" guaranteed in "this Basic Law") and have established specific legislative, executive and judicial organs in "the constitutional order" of "this Basic Law", each with separate functions bound by the law. These are "the basic principles" of the democratic rule of law (German: Rechtsstaat) and the separation of powers, which are principles endorsed by three United Nations resolutions.

=== Greece ===
The Greek eternity clause is Article 110 of the Greek Constitution. This article states that every article of the Constitution can be revised by the Parliament, with the exception of the fundamental ones, which establish Greece as a parliamentary republic and those of articles 2 paragraph 1, article 4 paragraphs 1, 4 and 7, article 5 paragraphs 1 and 3, article 13 paragraph 1 and article 26. These fundamental articles include:

- Republic (form of government): "The form of government of Greece is that of a parliamentary republic." Art. 1 Para. (1);
- Sovereignty of the people: "Popular sovereignty is the foundation of government." Art. 1 Para. (2);
- Democracy: "All powers derive from the People and exist for the People and the Nation; they shall be exercised as specified by the Constitution." Art. 1 Para. (3);
- Duty of all state authority: "The dignity of man is inviolable. To respect and protect it is the duty of all state authority." Art. 2 Para. (1);
- Rule of law: "Every Greek is equal before the law." Art. 4 Para. (1);
- Public functions: "Only Greek citizens shall be eligible for public service, except as otherwise provided by special laws." Art. 4 Para (4);
- Titles of nobility: "Titles of nobility or distinction are neither conferred upon nor recognized in Greek citizens." Art. 4 Para (7);
- Acknowledgement of free personality: "All people shall have the right to develop freely their personality and to participate in the social, economic and political life of the country, insofar as they do not infringe the rights of others or violate the Constitution and the good usages." Art. 5 Para (1);
- Personal liberty: "Personal liberty is inviolable. No one shall be prosecuted, arrested, imprisoned or otherwise confined except when and as the law provides." Art. 5 Para. (3);
- Freedom of religion: "Freedom of religious conscience is inviolable. The enjoyment of civil rights and liberties does not depend on the individual's religious beliefs." Art. 13 Para. (1)
- Separation of powers: "Specific legislative, executive and judicial organs", Art. 26.

=== Ireland ===
The Constitution of the Irish Free State was required in parts to be consistent with the 1922 Anglo-Irish Treaty, including the Oath of Allegiance and the Governor-General. The checks to protect this were removed by, for example, the Irish taking control of advice to the Governor-General, and later the abolition of the Senate when it proved obstructive.

In debate surrounding the 2018 relaxation of abortion laws, there were proposals to entrench certain aspects of the legislation, which was deemed unconstitutional. An attempt to overturn the 34th Amendment to the constitution on the basis that amendments were impermissible if they contradicted other provisions of the constitution was rejected by the Court of Appeal.

=== Italy ===
Article 139 of the Constitution of Italy, which came into effect in 1948, provides that the republican form of government shall not be a matter for constitutional amendment.

=== Portugal ===
In the Constitution of Portugal, an eternity clause exists in the form of article 288. Titled Material limits on revision, it provides that the following can never be removed through amendment:

- National independence and the unity of the state;
- The republican form of government;
- The separation between church and state;
- Citizens’ rights, freedoms and guarantees;
- The rights of workers, workers’ committees and trade unions;
- The coexistence of the public, private and cooperative and social sectors of ownership of the means of production;
- The existence of economic plans, within the framework of a mixed economy;
- The appointment of the elected officeholders of the entities that exercise sovereignty, of the organs of the autonomous regions and of local government organs by universal, direct, secret and periodic suffrage; and the proportional representation system;
- Plural expression and political organisation, including political parties, and the right of democratic opposition;
- The separation and interdependence of the entities that exercise sovereignty;
- The subjection of legal norms to review of their positive constitutionality and of their unconstitutionality by omission;
- The independence of the courts;
- The autonomy of local authorities;
- The political and administrative autonomy of the Azores and Madeira archipelagos.

=== Romania ===
On Title VII, Article 152, the Constitution of Romania lists the limits of revision:

1. The provisions of this Constitution with regard to the national, independent, unitary and indivisible character of the Romanian State, the republican form of government, territorial integrity, independence of justice, political pluralism and official language shall not be subject to revision.
2. Likewise, no revision shall be made if it results in the suppression of the citizens' fundamental rights and freedoms, or of the safeguards thereof.
3. The Constitution shall not be revised during a state of siege or emergency, or in wartime.

=== Spain ===
Most of the body of the Constitution of Spain can be modified by a three-fifths majority of both chambers of the Cortes Generales, or an absolute majority of the Senate and a two-thirds majority of the Congress of Deputies if the first method of approval fails.

However, modifications of the Preliminary Title (sovereignty and constitutional principles), the First Section of the First Title (fundamental rights and liberties of Spanish citizens), or the Second Title (the monarchy), as well as drafting a full new Constitution replacing the current, would require a two-thirds majority of both chambers, an immediate new general election, a two-thirds majority of the newly elected chambers, and a final referendum.

Constitutional amendments cannot be introduced during wartime or a state of emergency.

=== Ukraine ===
Article 157 of the Constitution of Ukraine states:

The Constitution of Ukraine shall not be amended, if the amendments foresee the abolition or restriction of human and citizens' rights and freedoms, or if they are oriented toward the liquidation of the independence or violation of the territorial indivisibility of Ukraine.

The Constitution of Ukraine shall not be amended in conditions of martial law or a state of emergency.

=== United Kingdom ===
The doctrine of parliamentary supremacy holds that Parliament may pass any law it wishes, with the exception that it cannot bind its successors (or be limited by its predecessors). Moreover, the UK's constitution is uncodified, being contained instead in informal conventions, standing orders of the two Houses of Parliament, and ordinary legislation (in particular Acts of Parliament). Therefore, the constitution is unentrenched as previous legislation can be amended by the passing of statute, requiring a simple majority vote in the House of Commons.

Notions of entrenchment have emerged in consideration of a number of constitutional statutes, including the Parliament Acts 1911 and 1949. (See R (Jackson) v Attorney General [2005] UKHL 56.)

Andrew Blick, Senior Lecturer in Politics at King's College London, argues that the use of a supermajority requirement for the House of Commons in the Fixed-term Parliaments Act 2011 represents a move towards entrenched clauses in the UK Constitution. Nevertheless, after failing to secure the required supermajority for an election in 2019, the government passed the Early Parliamentary General Election Act 2019, which only required a simple majority, to override the act and call an early general election. The Fixed-term Parliaments Act 2011 was subsequently repealed and replaced by the Dissolution and Calling of Parliament Act 2022, which deleted the supermajority requirement altogether and reinstated the government's power to call an election at will.

== Company law ==
Provisions may also be entrenched in the constitutions of corporate bodies. An example is in the memoranda and articles of a company limited by guarantee, in which the principles of common ownership may be entrenched. This practice can make it almost impossible for the company's members to dissolve the company and distribute its assets amongst them. This idea has more recently been extended in the UK through the invention of the community interest company (CIC), which incorporates an asset lock. Other companies in the UK may make provision for entrenchment of certain articles so that, for example, the specified articles may only be amended or repealed by agreement of all the members of the company or by a court order. In India there is similar provision in section 5 of the Companies Act 2013.

== See also ==
- Basic structure doctrine
- Peremptory norm
- Rigid constitution
