= Techreturns =

- Industry: Electronics - reuse and recycle
- Headquarters: Amsterdam, Netherlands
- Products: Used electronic equipments
- Services: Buys and sells used electronic equipment
- Website: www.techreturns.nl

Techreturns Nederland BV (2009-2014) was a Dutch company founded with the aim to reduce electronic waste by buying used electronics, especially mobile phones, from consumers and companies to repair them and give them a second life. Techreturns was founded in Amsterdam in 2009. It was member of Social Enterprise Nederland, an organization that supports social enterprises. Techreturns was declared bankrupt in December 2014.

Some clients choose to donate mobile phone through organisations such as Masterpeace and Artis Zoo. Techreturns sold the second hand devices mainly in Asia and Africa where there is a market for affordable, quality electronics. Sales also took place in Europe, especially in the Netherlands through its sister company BeatsNew.

Techreturns was connected to Closing the Loop a foundation collecting e-waste in developing countries for recycling. Involved in this project were also the organisations Fairphone and Text to Change.

Techreturns appeared multiple times in the Dutch media, for instance in a discussion about sustainability initiatives by the Dutch government, an annual summary of Dutch sustainable businesses 2013 by MVO Netherlands and in the consumer television programme Kassa on 14-01-14 in a segment about reuse versus recycling in the electronic industry.
