= Social Enterprise London =

British social enterprise agency

Established in 1998, Social Enterprise London (SEL) is the strategic agency for the development of social enterprise in London. SEL works with individuals, enterprises, organisations, government and other statutory bodies to provide enterprising solutions to social and environmental challenges and to create new ways of doing business.

== History ==
The first social enterprise agency in the UK, Social Enterprise London was established in 1998 after collaboration between co-operative businesses (Poptel, Computercraft Ltd, Calverts Press, Artzone), a number of co-operative development agencies (CDAs), and infrastructure bodies supporting co-operative enterprise development (Co-operative Training London, Co-operative Party, London ICOM, Co-operatives UK). SEL's first chief executive, Jonathan Bland, brought experience from Valencia where a business support infrastructure for co-operative enterprise was established using learning from the Mondragón region of Spain. SEL did more than provide support to emerging businesses: it created a community of interest by establishing an undergraduate degree in social enterprise and a Social Enterprise Journal. Allison Ogden-Newton, formerly CEO of Women's Education in Building (WEB), took over from Bland in 2004.

In July 2012 SEL announced that it would be integrating its key activities with the national body, Social Enterprise UK.

== Mission ==
SEL states that its mission is to "support and promote the success of social enterprises, positioning London as the global leader of the social enterprise movement".

== Board ==
SEL's board brings together some of the country's leading social entrepreneurs. The board includes (as co-chairs) Mark Sesnan, managing director of Greenwich Leisure Limited and Sophi Tranchell, former Chief Executive of Divine Chocolate.

== Activities ==
SEL is or has been the social enterprise strategic partner to organisations including the London Development Agency (LDA) and London borough councils. SEL operates as a social enterprise in its own right, running a wholly owned trading subsidiary that markets bespoke consultancy services, social enterprise training and publications. It delivers consultancy and business support across the world in countries including Vietnam, Korea and Croatia.

SEL worked with the LDA to establish a postgraduate degree in social enterprise development and management at the University of East London, led by Jon Griffith. (There was also an undergraduate degree, at the same university, led by Siobhan Riordan and Gladius Kulothungan).

In 2004 SEL developed and launched the Social Enterprise Journal, now managed by Liverpool John Moores University and published by Emerald Group Publishing.

It also runs the London Social Enterprise Network, a network of over 2,400 social enterprises and social entrepreneurs based across the world.

In October 2010 SEL developed and launched Transitions, a programme of training and consultancy designed to support public sector workers and public bodies keen to explore the potential of establishing 'spin out' social enterprises to deliver public services.

The organisation directly brokered over 500 social enterprise jobs under the DWP's Future Jobs Fund.
