= Citizen enterprise =

The term citizen enterprise started to be used in the United States in 2008 to describe businesses that practice corporate social responsibility (CSR).

== Information ==
In some countries, such as Papua New Guinea, the term is used to describe companies owned by citizens of that country, rather than by foreigners.

It should not be confused with social enterprise, which is a more complex notion involving origin, ownership and participation as well as objectives, activities and the use of profits.
