= Fairfield Materials Management Ltd =

British social enterprise based in Manchester

- Company type: Social enterprise
- Founded: 2003
- Headquarters: Openshaw, Manchester, UK
- Area served: North West of England
- Key people: Emma Smith, Ian Trippier, Val Rawlinson, Chris Walsh, Karen Usher, Eric Lowry
- Number of employees: 7 paid staff
- Website: http://www.fairfieldcompost.co.uk/

Fairfield Materials Management Ltd is a Manchester-based social enterprise that operates a community waste management project at Manchester’s New Smithfield Market focused on minimising waste, and bringing social and environmental benefits to Greater Manchester.

By utilising 'in-vessel composting', Fairfield Materials Management established the UK’s first sustainable biodegradable waste management system to operate on a wholesale market, diverted 16,500 tonnes of organic market waste material away from landfill between 2003 and 2008.

Fairfield has developed a composting production model that processes fruit, vegetable, plant and woody waste into peat-free, British Standards Institution PAS 100 accredited compost. It operates on a site fully licensed by the Environment Agency.

In 2003 Fairfield was recognised as the most innovative social enterprise within its sector by The Composting Association.

== History ==
Fairfield Materials Management was founded in 2003 by a small group of ecological activists, horticulturists and social entrepreneurs.

Fairfield Materials Management was initiated by Val Rawlinson (Director) after she became involved in an East Manchester anti-incineration campaign in 1996. The incinerator was not built, but Lucy Danger and Val Rawlinson realised that they had to show Manchester that environmental and social alternatives were available and working successfully throughout the United Kingdom and so Fairfield Composting was established by Val who began promoting home composting and supplying compost bins. and Lucy set up EMERGE Recycling recruiting Val as a director.

Val also recognised the need for a commercial sized composting system for New Smithfield Market and choose a Vertical Composting Unit (VCU) system as the preferred technology; Emma Smith was recruited as a waste auditor in November 2001 to undertake a waste composition analysis of Smithfield Market's waste. Chris Walsh joined the team and between 2001 and 2003 the group secured several hundred thousand pounds through grants and loans, designed the site, obtaining planning permission and a waste management licence.

In 2003 Fairfield began operating and initially diverted waste from four market traders, taking in green waste from Manchester City Council and producing compost. In 2004 a further two composting units were added and in 2005 a final three units were added to the system. This enabled Fairfield to process all of the market's fruit and vegetable waste through the in-situ technology. Whilst remaining a director of Fairfield Val set up Debdale Eco Centre(DEC) and with Emma's help secured funding to promote home composting. WRAP funding later enabled DEC to run a project supplying low cost compost bins which achieved high home composting levels. When Manchester City Council working in partnership with BIFFA introduced the Green Bin home composting levels were reduced negating the work undertaken by Val. Val retired from DEC aged 70 in 2010 but continues as a Director of Fairfield

In 2009 the Fairfield Group in partnership national renewable energy business Bio Group Ltd secured planning permission in Bredbury, Stockport for their second waste management site.
