= Empresa de insercion =

Empresas de Inserción ("Insertion companies" or "EI's") are businesses within the Spanish social economy. EIs are a special type of social enterprise that focus on employment for the most disadvantaged and excluded.

Spanish law for "Empresas de Inserción" defines them as follows: "[an] integration enterprise or cooperative corporation that, legally constituted and duly qualified by relevant regional organizations in this field, performs any economic activity of producing goods and services, designed to make arrangements for social integration and social and labor training of people experiencing social exclusion as a transition to regular employment.

"For these purposes, it must [protect] workers from extreme and difficult situations, [and] as part of their pathways to integration, [establish] custom processes, assist[ ] in paid work, [and] train[ ] in the workplace [in] labor and social habituation. Also, these companies should have intervention or support services to facilitate [ ] labor insertion subsequent [to] incorporation into the regular labor market".

From 2000 to 2002, the 12 areas surveyed had a total of 14,200 EI in 40 different business structures. The vast majority of EI in Spain are in Basque Country and in Catalonia.
