= Social Enterprise UK =

UK community interest company

Social Enterprise UK (previously known as The Social Enterprise Coalition) is a community interest company founded in April 2002 in the United Kingdom. It functions as the national membership and campaigning body for the social enterprise movement in Britain.

== Organisation ==
Social Enterprise UK liaises with similar groups in each region of England, as well as in Northern Ireland, Scotland and Wales. It is a membership organisation. In 2011, more than seven thousand social enterprises were members of Social Enterprise UK. Social enterprises sometimes deliver public services.

== History ==
The Social Enterprise Coalition was founded in April 2002 as a community interest company.

In 2007, Claire Dove took over the role of chair from Glenys Thornton, she runs the social enterprise Blackburne House in Liverpool.

Between 2007 and 2010, the organisation ran a social enterprise ambassador scheme. It spent £860,000 on the project. The Office of the Third Sector support the ambassador scheme.

Since January 2010, Social Enterprise UK's chief executive has been Peter Holbrook. Previously he had worked at the social enterprise Sunlight Development Trust, based in Gillingham, Kent. In took over the role after Jonathan Bland.

In 2011, Social Enterprise Coalition was rebranded as Social Enterprise UK as it is now known. Its company name was changed from 'The Social Enterprise Coalition' to 'Social Enterprise Coalition CIC' in 2013.

In 2012, Social Enterprise UK ran the 'Not In Our Name' campaign against Salesforce.com, a global software and CRM company, that had begun using the term 'social enterprise' to describe its products and had applied for 'social enterprise' trademarks in the EU, US, Australia, and Jamaica. The campaign was supported by similar organisations in the US (the Social Enterprise Alliance), Canada, South Africa, and Australia. An open letter was sent to the CEO and Chairman of Salesforce.com asking Salesforce.com to stop using the term 'social enterprise'. It was signed by people and organisations around the world, including Muhammad Yunus (Grameen Bank founder and Nobel Peace Prize laureate), Richard G. Wilkinson and Kate Pickett (co-authors of The Spirit Level). Salesforce said they would withdraw applications to trademark the term 'social enterprise', and remove any references to 'social enterprise' in its marketing materials in the future.

In July 2012, Social Enterprise London announced that it would be integrating its key activities with Social Enterprise UK.

In January 2017, Victor Adebowale became the chair of Social Enterprise UK.

== UK Social Enterprise Awards ==
Social Enterprise UK deliver the UK Social Enterprise Awards in cooperation with Cwmpas, Social Enterprise Northern Ireland and Social Enterprise Scotland.

== Publications ==
- No More Business as Usual: A Social Enterprise Manifesto, published February 2010, aiming to raise the profile of social enterprises in advance of the general election taking place that year. The manifesto aimed to increase the contribution of social enterprises threefold between 2010 and 2020, building on its £24bn per year economic impact in 2010.
- Fightback Britain: A report on the state of social enterprise survey (2011)
- SEUK: The People's Business A report on the state of social enterprise survey (2013)
- Leading the World in Social Enterprise - State of Social Enterprise Report 2015 (2015).
