= Rigid constitution =

Most supreme law, above other law

Rigid constitution is a constitution which stands above the other laws of the country, while flexible constitutions do not.

A. V. Dicey defines a rigid constitution as one under which certain laws, called constitutional laws or fundamental laws "cannot be changed in the same manner as ordinary laws." A rigid constitution set forth "specific legal/constitutional obstacles to be overcome" before it may be amended, such as special approval of the people by referendum, a supermajority or special majority in the legislature, or both. In contrast, a flexible constitution is one in which the legislature may amend the constitution's content and principles through use of the ordinary legislative process.

== See also ==
- Constitutional amendment – Formal change to the text of the constitution of an entity
- Entrenched clause – Part of a constitution that restricts amendments
- Parliamentary sovereignty – Constitutional legal doctrine
- Uncodified constitution – Legal doctrine source of rigid constitution
