= Cycling Without Age =

- Abbreviation: CWA
- Formation: 2012; 14 years ago
- Founders: Ole Kassow
- Type: Nonprofit organization (NPO)
- Headquarters: Copenhagen, Denmark
- Region served: Worldwide
- Services: Provide free trishaw rides for the elderly
- Key people: Ole Kassow (Founder); Pernille Bussone (Director)
- Volunteers: 33,000
- Website: cyclingwithoutage.org

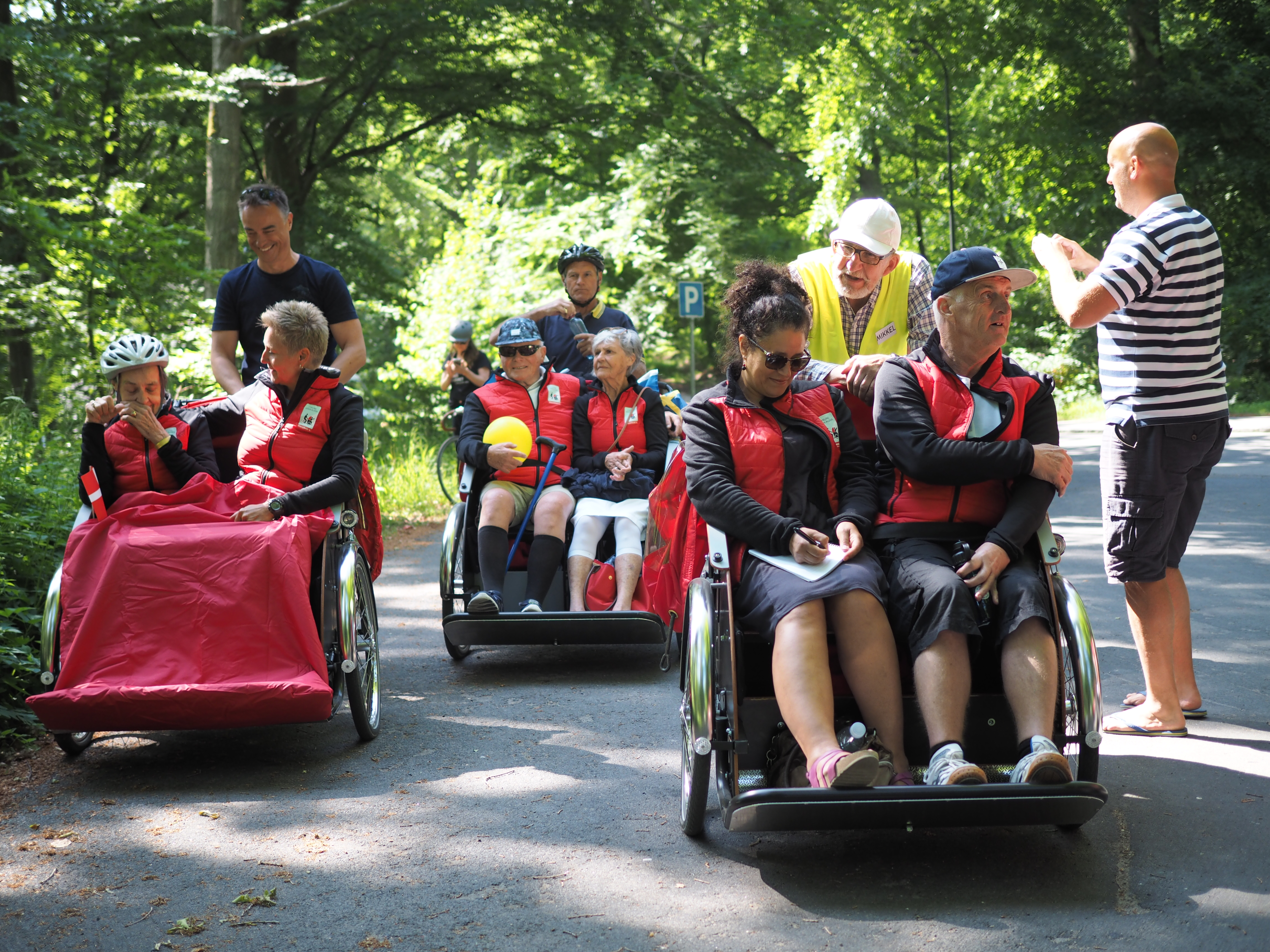
Øresund Tour (2016)

Cycling Without Age (CWA) is a nonprofit organization founded in Copenhagen, Denmark in 2012. By 2020, this initiative had expanded into 50 countries, serving over 1.5 million people worldwide.

Cycling Without Age offers recreational mobility to seniors in the form of volunteer-piloted trishaw rides. The passengers and their volunteer riders (called "pilots") are also encouraged to communicate and bond with each other.

Cycling Without Age has chapters throughout the world. Each chapter is typically at the service of a specific nursing home. The trishaw rides are offered by local volunteer pilots. These rides enable seniors with limited mobility to explore their neighbourhood and the surrounding nature.

== History ==
The history of Cycling Without Age began in Copenhagen in 2012 when the 47-year-old social entrepreneur Ole Kassow cycled to work every day. As he passed a nursing home, he noticed a 97-year-old man with a walker. Inferring from the popularity of cycling in Copenhagen, Kassow assumed the man had been a cycler when he was younger. Later, Kassow received permission from the care home to carry a resident in a trishaw, a positive experience that led to more residents asking for rides.

When Kassow wrote to the city council of Copenhagen and asked for the financing of the trishaw for the senior citizens' home, his idea was met with support; five trishaws were ordered. With a parade of the new trishaws in April 2013, the initiative was presented to the public.

Kassow's idea gave rise to the initiative Cykling uden alder (transl. English: "Cycling without age", German: "Radeln ohne Alter") which spread quickly in Denmark and soon afterwards in many countries around the world. As of March 2020, there were 2200 regional chapters with over 3000 trishaws in more than 50 countries in Europe, North America, Asia and Australasia.

== Operations ==
Often when a Cycling Without Age chapter is formed in a neighbourhood area. That group then organizes a trishaw and makes it available for excursions to surrounding senior citizens' facilities and other social institutions. Volunteers are instructed in the handling of the trishaw and make themselves available as pilots in their free time. Other Cycling Without Age chapters are associated with a specific social institution and serve only that facility.

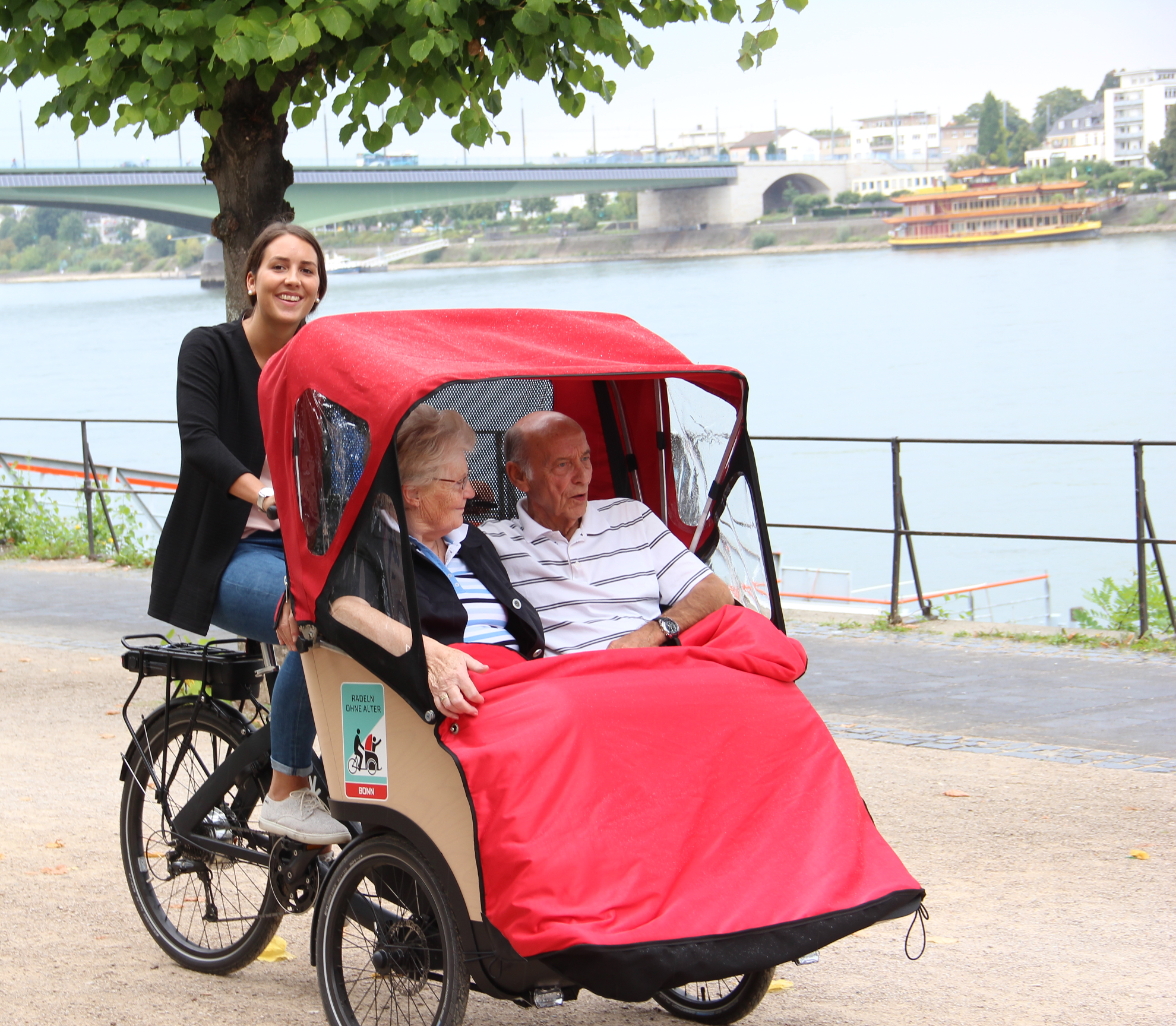
A Cycling Without Age outing along the Rhine river near Bonn, Germany

All trips with the senior citizens are always free, and communications between the volunteer and the passengers are encouraged. The organization emphasises the story told by the elderly passengers, instructing the volunteer riders to pay attention to them as well as utilizing them in their social media promotions. To facilitate the communication, a special type of trishaw is used so that the passengers sitting in the front can clearly hear what the pilot says, and the pilots can easily listen to their passengers' stories.

== Impact ==
A 2018 study at the Hospital Sant Pau in Barcelona, Spain, reported that all 14 participants felt that the relationship with the volunteer pilot was very positive. The majority "loved the trips, felt more motivated and would recommend CWA. The main reasons they liked CWA" was "going out for a ride and get distracted."

In 2019, a study by the German Institut für Bildung, Erziehung und Beratung (Institute for Education, Upbringing and Guidance) found that the trips offered by Cycling Without Age generally have a positive effect on older people. The passengers benefit from the many new social contacts and perceive the outings as an enrichment for their everyday life. With the extended range of travel, they can experience the great outdoors again and visit places they have fond memories of. In particular, however, the passengers enjoy the conversations with the trishaw pilot and other people they meet.

Due to the special design of the trishaws used by Cycling Without Age (passengers in front, rider at the back), communication is possible at any time without any problems: 'The social isolation, which is a major hurdle in everyday life for many seniors, is inevitably reduced or even dissolved by Cycling Without Age — from which not only the seniors, but also the pilots themselves benefit enormously. The positive experiences with the pilots are also very far-reaching. They lose fear of contact with the older generation and learn to interact with them in a casual and relaxed manner. The drivers can combine sporting activity with social commitment and also have important interpersonal experiences.'

A 2019 impact study from Singapore found that nursing home residents experienced an increase in self-reported mood and outlook on life of 80% after 5 rides. Among young volunteers the report found a 36% increase in comfort level communicating and interacting with seniors.

A 2020 study in Scotland also looked at the effects of the Cycling Without Age initiative on the mood and well-being of residents in senior citizens' facilities: "Analyses revealed significant improvements in mood and wellbeing at follow-up on ride days versus no ride days."

Reports in the media confirm the positive impacts of trishaw outings with seniors and their drivers: "It creates extraordinary experiences for them. They come out of that building and they get that wind in their hair and they are smiling from ear to ear." "Many of the passengers talk about the joy of having the wind in their hair again. Some passengers have told me after a ride 'I am so happy' which makes me tear up!"
