= French Empire =

French Empire (French: Empire Français) may refer to:

- First French Empire, ruled by Napoleon I from 1804 to 1814 and in 1815 and by Napoleon II in 1815, the French state from 1804 to 1814 and in 1815
- Second French Empire, led by Napoleon III, the French state from 1852 to 1870
- French colonial empire, the territories administered by France from the 16th century to the mid-20th century
- Francia, or the Frankish Empire of Charlemagne, the territory inhabited by the Franks, a West Germanic tribal confederation, from 481 to 843
- Empire style, an early 19th-century design movement
- Second Empire architecture, a late 19th-century design movement
