= Glad Foundation =

Danish foundation

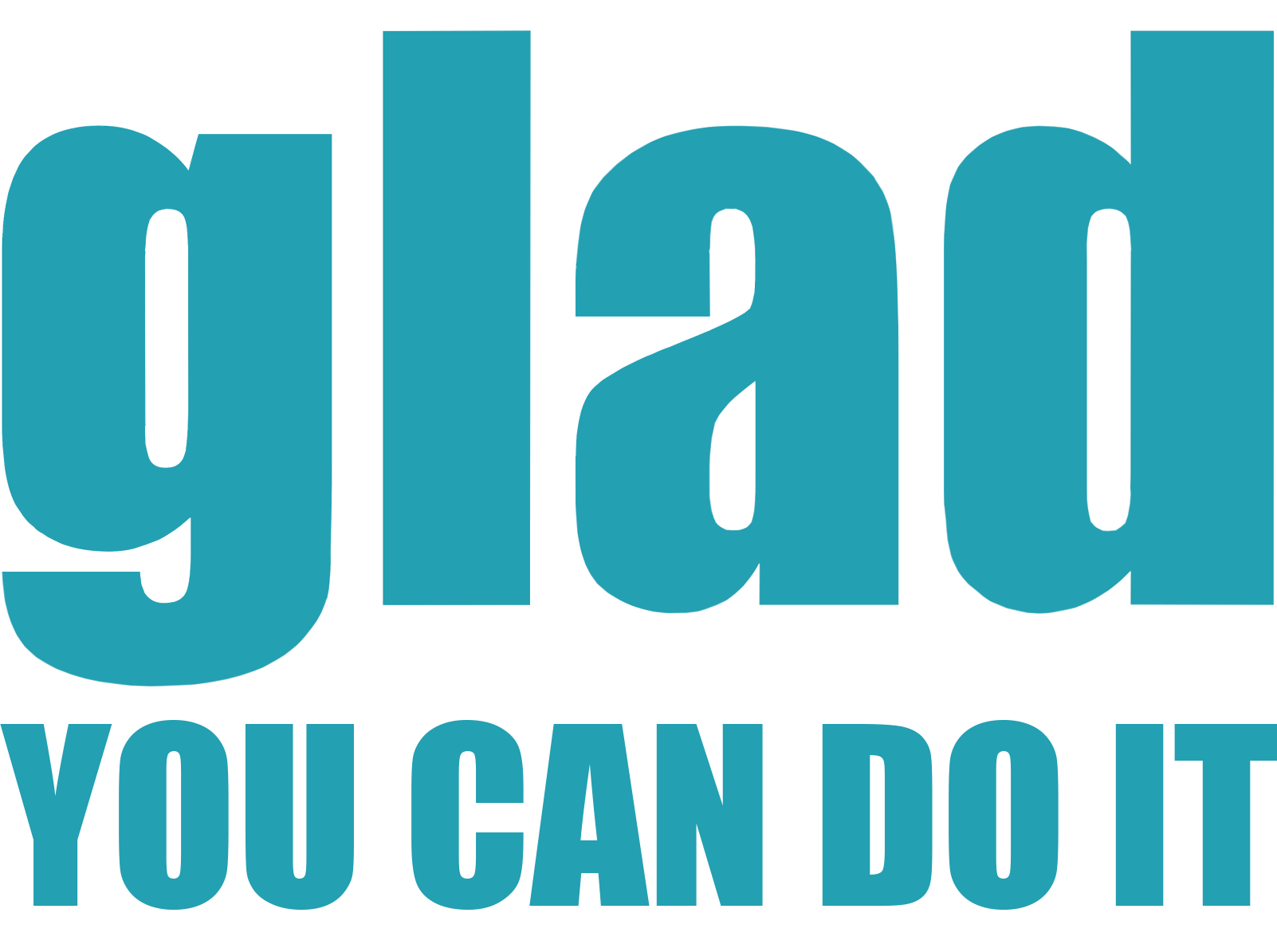
- Country: Denmark

Glad Foundation (Danish: Glad Fonden) is a Danish social enterprise aimed at inclusion of people with different abilities. It began in 1999, with their television station called TV-Glad. The station is the world's first television station for people with developmental disabilities. TV-Glad is part of the Glad Foundation, which is a growth focused company that trains and employs people with and without disabilities to produce services, products, cultural experiences and content for different media of a quality that can compete on market terms.

Glad Foundation have around 300 employees in four cities in Denmark. Glad Foundation Esbjerg, Glad Foundation Ringsted, Glad Foundation Aabenraa and finally Glad Foundation Copenhagen where it all began. TV-Glad broadcasting programs on configurations are local TV channels in Denmark.
