= Launch It =

Youth enterprise charity in the UK

- LYST logo
- Abbreviation: LYST
- Formation: 2000
- Type: Charity
- Purpose: Youth Enterprise
- Location: United Kingdom
- Official language: English
- Chief Executive: Patrick Shelley
- Website: Official website

Launch It (formerly the London Youth Support Trust), is a youth enterprise charity in the United Kingdom founded in 2000 to help young people from disadvantaged backgrounds. Through their business incubation centres, they provide young people aged 18–30 with guidance and space at a subsidised rent to develop their business.

They have centres in Tottenham, Aylesbury, Peckham and Mitcham. The Trust's newest centre, The Mitcham Enterprise Centre, was opened by Siobhain Mcdonagh, the MP of Merton in 2018.

== Centres ==
=== Tottenham Green Enterprise Centre (TGEC) ===
The Tottenham Green Enterprise Centre was set up as a joint venture involving the London Borough of Haringey, the Tottenham Task Force, the College of North East London and North London TEC. In 2008, the London Youth Support Trust took over the running of the centre, hosting a range of different businesses.

=== 639 Enterprise Centre ===
The 639 Enterprise Centre, based in Tottenham, was established with funding from the Mayor of London's Regeneration fund, targeted at improving communities damaged by the 2011 London Riots. The centre was opened by Boris Johnson, Mayor of London in May 2013.

Alongside business space and guidance, the centre also offers help finding work, placements and volunteering opportunities to the local community. In 2014, the centre became a CitySafe Haven, dedicated to the life of 17-year-old Godwin Lawson, a Tottenham resident who died in a knife attack in 2010.

=== Mitcham Enterprise Centre ===
On 25 January 2018, Launch It opened up their newly refurbished enterprise centre in Mitcham. With the help of Moat Homes and United Living, Launch It was able to rejuvenate the centre into business planning, to help accessing funding, to mentoring and digital skills training, there is a wide range of services available, all completely free. Siobhain Mcdonagh, the MP for Merton/Mitcham, opened the center.

=== Peckham Enterprise Centre ===
The Peckham Enterprise centre is Launch It's main centre in South London. Opened on 1 April 2016, Peckham has been an innovation for many young entrepreneurs and has proven to be a successful addition to Launch It. A partnership between Launch It and Southwark Council, the centre hosts 11 start-up businesses and gives pre-starts a space to work in its hot-desking area. The indoor garden contains 7 modified sheds that have been transformed into office spaces.

=== Dundee Enterprise Centre ===
Launch It Dundee opened in May 2019 right in the heart of Dundee City Centre at Kandahar House. Launch It Dundee is a separate charity (charity number – SCO48425), supported in its setup by the Launch It Trust.
