= Wedu Global =

Thai non-profit foundation

Wedu
- Company type: Non-profit foundation, registered in both Cambodia and Thailand
- Founded: 2012
- Founder: Mario Ferro and Mari Sawai
- Headquarters: Bangkok, Thailand
- Website: www.weduglobal.org

Wedu is a non-profit foundation that supports the development of women leaders in South and Southeast Asia through mentorship, leadership development, and education financing. Wedu stands for 'women's education'. Founded in 2012 and headquartered in Bangkok, Thailand, Wedu operates as a Thai-registered foundation and a Cambodian-registered organisation.

The organisation's vision is “a world where half of all leaders are women”, and its programs focus on enabling women to access capability, capital, and community to advance their leadership journeys.

== History ==
Wedu was founded in 2012 by Mario Ferro and Mari Sawai. The organisation began by working with small cohorts of women leaders in Cambodia through mentorship-based support.

Over time, Wedu expanded regionally and developed an integrated leadership ecosystem combining structured leadership development, education financing, and long-term mentorship. Its model evolved in response to structural barriers affecting women's access to higher education, professional advancement, and leadership opportunities in Asia.

== Mission and approach ==
Wedu works to address systemic and internal barriers that limit women's leadership in Asia, including restricted access to education, financing, and professional networks. Its model combines three core pillars:

- Capability – leadership development through structured courses and academies focused on self-awareness, goal setting, and applied leadership skills;
- Capital – access to education financing through income-sharing agreements (ISAs), reducing upfront financial barriers; and
- Community – long-term mentorship and peer networks supporting sustained leadership growth.

This integrated approach is designed to support women across different stages of their personal and professional development.

== Programmes ==
=== Leadership development ===
Wedu delivers leadership programmes such as the Introduction to Leadership course and the Women's Leadership Academy, which focus on self-awareness, goal-setting, and leadership skills development.

These programmes are often delivered in partnership with regional initiatives, including the Young Southeast Asian Leaders Initiative (YSEALI).

=== Mentorship ===
Wedu's Global Mentorship Programme provides structured, one-on-one mentoring relationships between women leaders and professionals across sectors. The programme typically runs in multi-month cycles and focuses on leadership development, confidence-building, and network expansion.

The organisation has also implemented mentorship initiatives in humanitarian contexts, including collaborations with the International Rescue Committee (IRC) for refugee communities along the Thailand-Myanmar border and the International Federation of Red Cross and Red Crescent Societies (IFRC) for the Women as Humanitarian Leaders programme.

=== Education funding ===
The organisation operates an Income Sharing Agreement (ISA) programme, an education financing model, funded by Pioneer Fund. Pioneer Fund is a blended finance mechanism composed of philanthropic and patient capital. Wedu's ISAs enable women to access education without upfront costs. Participants repay a fixed percentage of their future income after completing their studies, creating a revolving fund that supports future participants.

Wedu is considered the longest-standing and most experienced operator in the Income Sharing space across Asia and the only women-centred one.

== Impact and reach ==
As of 2024, Wedu has supported over 5,000 women across more than 15 countries in South and Southeast Asia through its programmes.

Key reported outcomes include the following:

- Over 1,700 participants completed leadership courses in 2024;
- More than 1,100 women participated in leadership academies;
- Hundreds of mentorship matches are facilitated annually; and
- Ongoing expansion of education financing through its ISA programme

Wedu's community includes women leaders, mentors, and partners from over 30 countries, forming a regional network focused on advancing gender equality in leadership.

== Strategy and focus areas ==
Wedu's 2025–2027 strategy focuses on addressing interconnected challenges affecting women leaders in Asia, including the following:

- Climate change and climate resilience
- The care economy and unpaid labour
- Barriers to economic empowerment

The organisation aims to expand access to leadership opportunities and support women-led solutions to these challenges.

== Partnerships and recognition ==
Wedu collaborates with philanthropic foundations, social investors, civil society organisations, educational institutions, and corporate partners to deliver its programmes across South and Southeast Asia.

=== Income Sharing Agreement (ISA) partners ===
Wedu's education financing model is supported by philanthropic and blended finance partners, including these:

- Pioneer Fund
- Octava Foundation
- The Social Investment Consultancy Ltd (TSIC)
- Circle of Angels
- Kiva
- The Sunline Foundation
- Synergy Social Ventures
- Nepal Communiversity
- Yuwa
- Abeer Akhter ZamZam
- Thabyay Education Foundation
- Institut Nasional Flores

These partnerships contribute to the capital base of Wedu's revolving income-sharing fund and support expansion of access to higher education.

=== Leadership programmes and mentorship partners ===
Wedu has collaborated with regional and international organisations to deliver leadership development and mentorship initiatives, including the following:

- U.S. Mission to ASEAN
- International Rescue Committee (IRC)
- International Federation of Red Cross and Red Crescent Societies (IFRC)
- Feminist Food Journal
- AGREA Agricultural Systems International

These collaborations have included leadership training delivery, mentorship programmes, and initiatives in humanitarian and community-based contexts.

=== Corporate partners ===
Wedu has also worked with corporate partners supporting programme delivery, community engagement, and professional exposure opportunities, including the following:

- Twilio
- visit.org
- Shangri-La Phnom Penh
