= Chavez for Charity =

Jewelry companies of the United States

Chavez for Charity (CFC) is a line of jewelry founded by Julie Marie Chavez and Joe Cerbo, launched in 2013. Chavez uses the line to raise money and awareness for more than a dozen charities; donating a portion of the proceeds based on the color of jewelry purchased. Each bracelet is unique and features different beads, stones, and charms.

In 2013, Chavez for Charity donated a total of $165,000. From 2013 to early 2015 the total amount donated is reported to be $400,000, which was disbursed to its partner charities. Julie Marie Chavez was honored at the January 2014 Pre-Grammy Party for the Whole Planet Foundation.

== Accessory Lines ==
Chavez for Charity is best known for its generous donation amount of 25% and has reached $1 Million dollars in donations. The accessory line includes signature and children's lines, with each line supporting 10 different charities. The signature line includes Alex's Lemonade Stand Foundation, Water.org, V-Day, Fisher House Foundation, Gift for Life, Dr. Susan Love Foundation, Whole Planet Foundation, Partners In Health, Matthew Shepard Foundation and Best Friends Animal Society. The Chavez for Charity Kids line is composed of charities relating to children's issues, including STOMP Out Bullying, Pencils of Promise, Whole Kids Foundation, After-School All-Stars, The Lunchbox Fund, Jumpstart for Young Children, HollyRod Foundation, Geffen Playhouse .

Each charity is represented by a different color. Chavez for Charity donates 25% of its gross profits to the charity that corresponds with the colors purchased.
