= HVAC (organization) =

HVAC.com
- Company type: Private
- Headquarters: Indian Land, South Carolina, United States
- Industry: Heating and cooling
- Website: www.hvac.com

HVAC.com is an Indian Land, South Carolina, United States-based website. It provides information to consumers on HVAC topics.
