= Gregory Dees =

American scientist and professor

- Born: October 16, 1950
- Died: December 20, 2013 (aged 63)

Academic background
- Education: University of Cincinnati (BA); Yale (Masters); Johns Hopkins University (PhD)

Academic work
- Discipline: business
- Institutions: Stanford Graduate School of Business; Fuqua School of Business
- Main interests: social entrepreneurship

Gregory Dees (James Gregory Dees; October 16, 1950 – December 20, 2013), referred to as the father of social entrepreneurship education, was an American scientist, professor, founder and director of the Center for Social Entrepreneurship Development (CASE) of Duke University.

== Biography ==
Dees was born on October 16, 1950, in Cincinnati, Ohio.

He graduated with a bachelor's degree in philosophy from the University of Cincinnati, a master's degree in public and private management from Yale, and a doctorate in philosophy from Johns Hopkins University.

He co-founded the Center for Social Innovation at Stanford's Graduate School of Business.

Dees joined the faculty of the Duke University Fuqua School of Business as Adjunct Professor of Social Entrepreneurship in 2001.

While at Duke, he co-founded Center for Social Entrepreneurship Development (CASE) with Beth Battle Anderson.

He chaired the World Economic Forum’s Global Agenda Councils on social entrepreneurship and on social innovation.

Dees died on December 20, 2013, while at Duke Hospital.

== Publications ==
=== Books ===
- Enterprising Nonprofits: A Toolkit for Social Entrepreneurs (2001, ISBN 978-0-471-15116-6)
- Strategic Tools for Social Entrepreneurs: Enhancing the Performance of Your Enterprising Nonprofit (2002, ISBN 978-0-471-15068-8)

=== Selected papers ===
- The Meaning of "Social Entrepreneurship" (1998)
- For-Profit Social Ventures (2003)
- Taking social entrepreneurship seriously (2007) doi:10.1007/BF02819936

== Awards ==
- Harvard's Apgar Award for Innovation in Teaching (1995)
- The Aspen Institute and Ashoka lifetime achievement award in social entrepreneurship education (2007)
