= Future Jobs Fund =

2009 UK government jobs initiative

The Future Jobs Fund (FJF) was a UK government initiative introduced in 2009 which aimed to help long term unemployed people back into employment.

== Initiative ==
It was cut by the Coalition government, Prime Minister David Cameron claiming the scheme was "expensive, badly targeted and did not work". However, a 2012 report by the Department for Work and Pensions (DWP) found that the scheme produced a net benefit though tax receipts and a reduced benefits bill. It estimated that the FJF programme resulted in:

- a net benefit to participants of approximately £4,000 per participant
- a net benefit to employers of approximately £6,850 per participant
- a net cost to the Exchequer of approximately £3,100 per participant
- a net benefit to society of approximately £7,750 per participant

Under the baseline assumptions, the total net cost of the programme to the Exchequer was estimated to be approximately £330m. The gross cost to the Exchequer was approximately £720m but it is estimated to have recouped roughly 50 pence for each pound that was spent on the programme.

The Cameron-Clegg government replaced the FJF with the expanded programme Youth Contract.

== See also ==
- New Deal of the Mind
