= Ole Kassow (social entrepreneur) =

Danish social entrepreneur

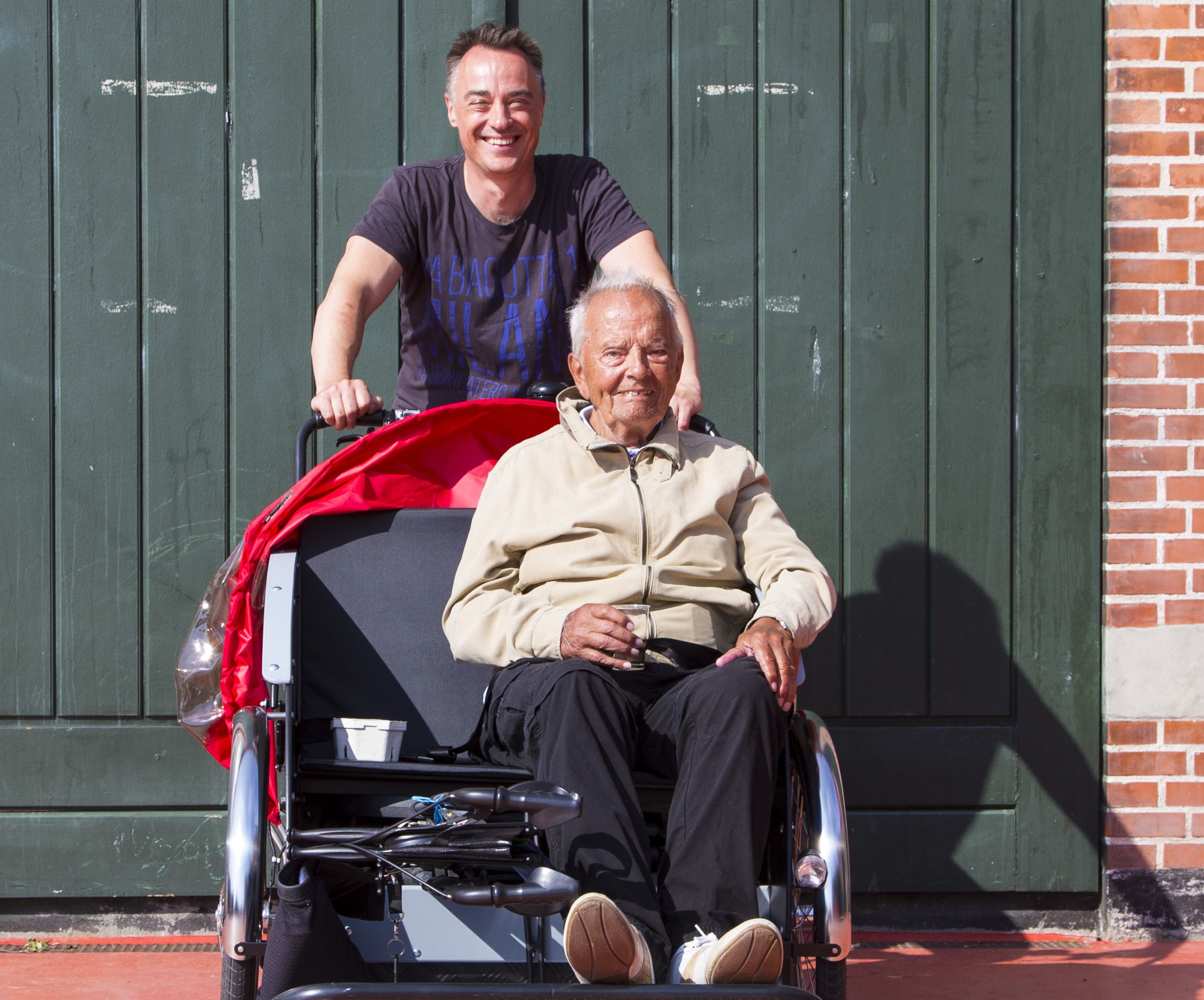
- Ole Kassow with Thorkild Thim who inspired him to start Cycling Without Age
- Born: June 26, 1966 (age 59); Odense, Southern Denmark (Syddanmark), Denmark
- Occupation: Social entrepreneur
- Known for: founder of Cycling Without Age

Ole Kassow (born 26 June 1966) is a Danish social entrepreneur. He founded the nonprofit organization Cycling Without Age in 2012.

== Early life ==
Ole Kassow was born in Odense, Denmark. He grew up with a handicapped father and brother, experiencing at an early age stigmatization and exclusion of persons with certain disabilities. However, his father's practical jokes and humour to overcome the handicaps in their life and to infuse happiness into people around them helped to develop Ole's positive attitude towards disabilities and old age.

== Education ==
After completing high school, Ole travelled to various countries to learn more about different cultures and languages. He then attended the University of Southern Denmark between 1986 and 1990, where he enrolled in the programme International negotiation – economics, language and culture and finished it with a master's degree (cand. negot.).

Until 2012, Ole Kassow worked for several companies as product manager, director, CEO, and consultant. He also supported the founding of various commercial startup companies.

== Career ==
In 2004, he started his own business ″olekassow.com″ providing betterness consultancy to ″inspire and help companies [to] reach their potential″. In 2012, Ole Kassow and others founded ″The Bike Republic″ (Cykelrepublikken), an NGO supporting the fight for improvements to the city infrastructure for cyclists and pedestrians. Also in 2012, he started the company ″Purpose Makers″ which believes ″that the future belongs to purpose-driven companies and organizations. They will have strong cultures, engaged and happy employees and enthusiastic customers, patients, citizens and users. They're here to change the world.″

His most prominent endeavour was the founding of the Cycling Without Age organization in 2012. This movement enables senior citizens with limited mobility to enjoy outings with volunteer-piloted trishaws. By March 2020, this movement had spread to more than 50 countries with 2,200 local chapters operating 3,000 trishaws, serving 1.5 million people by 33,000 trained cycle pilots.

In 2017, Ole Kassow was awarded the Ashoka Fellowship – only the second Danish person to receive this notable award.

Ole Kassow lives and works in Copenhagen, Denmark.

== Awards ==
- Danish Community Award (Fællesskabsprisen) (2014)
- Peter Elming Award (Peter Elming-Prisen – annual award by the Danish Cyclists Federation) (2014)
- Ashoka Fellow (2017)
