= Ole Kassow (rower) =

Danish rower (born 1935)

Personal information
- Full name: Ole Bjarne Kassow
- Nationality: Danish
- Born: 25 September 1935 (age 89); Helsingør, Denmark

Sport
- Sport: Rowing

Ole Bjarne Kassow (born 25 September 1935) is a Danish rower. He competed in the men's coxless four event at the 1960 Summer Olympics. In 1966, he received the badge of honor from the Københavns Roklub (Copenhagen Rowing Club).
