= Closing the Loop =

Dutch social enterprise that offers a closed loop service for mobile phones

Closing the Loop is a company that offers a closed loop service for mobile phones. The Dutch social enterprise is based in Amsterdam, the Netherlands. It was founded with the aim to reduce electronic waste (e-waste). It does this by offering users and sellers of phones a way to make their device material-neutral and waste free. The company pays people in emerging markets to collect scrap phones. These phones are then recycled for Closing the Loop’s customers. The proposition works on a one for one basis, where a customer’s phone is ‘offset’ by the recycling of a broken phone. Known customers are Shiftphone, T-Mobile, KPMG, the city of Utrecht, Rabobank and the Dutch national government.

Closing the Loop buys and collects 'end-of-life' scrap phones in African countries, where many used phones from Europe and the US get a second life. The waste Closing the Loop collects, is recycled in Europe. In this way Closing the Loop turns scrap phones into valuable resources and an income for people in developing countries. Its goal is to prevent mobile phones from ending up in dump sites and at the same time create a more sustainable telecom industry.

== Impact ==
Closing the Loop has saved more than 2.2 million mobile phones from the dump in Africa and gave more than 145,000 mobile phones a second life. Mobile phones are bought from informal local collector networks. To date, Closing the Loop has helped more than 2,000 people in Africa to earn additional income through safe employment.

The social enterprise sees e-waste as an opportunity. An opportunity to source companies with responsibly sourced metals, to make industries like telecom circular - by closing loops - and to create income for people in emerging markets. It aims to contribute to the circular economy and the Sustainable Development Goals.

== History ==
Closing the Loop was founded in 2012 by Joost de Kluijver. Joost started with an NGO to make the electronic industry aware of the impact of e-waste. Joost and his team therefore took own initiative and showed that the metals inside broken mobile phones still have a value as they contain gold, silver, copper and other recyclable metals. Closing the Loop set up a network of collectors in African countries and in 2015 the first container filled with mobile phones was shipped from Ghana to Europe for proper recycling.

== Electronic waste ==
When at the end of their lifespan, scrap mobile phones are often dumped and become a hazard for the environment and human health. For example, in landfills like Agbogbloshie, e-waste is dumped and people try to make a living by burning electronics to extract metals. The fumes that are released are very toxic.
