= Asset lock =

An asset lock is a legal clause that prevents the assets of a company from being used for private gain rather than the stated purposes of the organisation.

Asset locks may be incorporated into the formal structure of a "bencom" (a benefit corporation, which is a type of industrial and provident society),community interest company, or charitable organisation.
