= Environmental conditions of South Korea =

South Korea's environment

In regards to environmental pollution, South Korea has the highest level among the 38 OECD countries. With a population density of 492 people per square kilometer, it ranks third in the world, with more than half of the population living in the Seoul metropolitan area, which accounts for 11.8% of the land area. Therefore, since the population density of the metropolitan area is 4,169, the environmental pollution problem has a characteristic proportional to the population, so it is natural that the environmental pollution level is high. In addition, it is calculated that urban land will take 3,838 km (1,300 times the area of Yeouido) over the next 20 years, and 65 times the area of Yeouido will be developed as a residential or industrial complex every year. Accordingly, the forest area is decreasing by 78 km, and the tidal flat by 36 km every year, indicating how serious the environmental damage in Korea is.

Moreover, the amount of waste that pollutes the environment is nine times that of the United States, four times that of fertilizer and pesticide, and eight times that of sulfur dioxide is emitted, so the seriousness of environmental pollution is bound to intensify day by day. As a result of the above, the average temperature of Earth has risen by 0.74 degrees Celsius over the past 100 years, but Korea has risen by 1.5 degrees Celsius, twice as much as this. If Korea's warming trend continues as it is, greenhouse gases could double from the current level by 2030, raising the temperature on the Korean Peninsula to up to 4 degrees Celsius. Accordingly, it is expected that all crops and fruits will lead to a decrease in production by more than 30%.

If the temperature of the Earth rises by 1 degree Celsius, the location conditions of the ecosystem change by 100 kilometers. If the temperature in Korea rises by 4 degrees Celsius in the next 20 years, the location conditions of the ecosystem will change by 400 kilometers. In other words, the ecosystem in Busan will move north to Seoul. Ecosystems are connected by food chains, so when the ecosystem is relocated, creatures that cannot move may disappear. The Korean Peninsula is affected by climate change, and various environmental pollution issues are present.

The environment can be divided into a geographical environment and a social environment. Geographic environment refers to an objectively and physically given environment. It can be seen that the components of the geographical environment interact to form a unity. In other words, it generally refers to the natural appearance of the natural environment. On the other hand, the social environment refers to the inclusion of ideas, values, and human behavior. It is formed by humans and appears differently depending on the times and society. Pedagogy explains that although it is unclear which environment human behavior is more affected, changing the social environment is more important to human life than changing the natural environment.

== Geographical environment ==
Further information: Environment of South Korea

== Coast ==
Korea's topography surrounded by the sea on three sides

=== Three-sided sea ===
South Korea occupies the southern portion of the Korean Peninsula, which extends some 1,100 km (680 mi) from the Asian mainland. This mountainous peninsula is flanked by the Yellow Sea to the west, and the Sea of Japan to the east. Its southern tip lies on the Korea Strait and the East China Sea.

The country, including all its islands, lies between latitudes 33° and 39°N, and longitudes 124° and 130°E. Its total area is 100,032 square kilometers (38,622.57 square miles).

South Korea can be divided into four general regions – an eastern region of high mountain ranges and narrow coastal plains: a western region of broad coastal plains, river basins, and rolling hills; a southwestern region of mountains and valleys; and a southeastern region dominated by the broad basin of the Nakdong River. South Korea is home to three terrestrial ecoregions: Central Korean deciduous forests, Manchurian mixed forests, and Southern Korea evergreen forests.

South Korea's terrain is mostly mountainous, most of which is not arable. Lowlands, located primarily in the west and southeast, make up only 30% of the total land area.

About three thousand islands, mostly small and uninhabited, lie off the western and southern coasts of South Korea. Jeju is about 100 kilometers off the southern coast of South Korea. It is the country's largest island, with an area of 1,845 square kilometers (712 square miles). Jeju is also the site of South Korea's highest point: Hallasan, an extinct volcano, reaches 1,950 meters (6,400 feet) above sea level. The easternmost islands of South Korea include Ulleungdo and Liancourt Rocks, while Marado and Socotra Rock are the southernmost islands of South Korea.

== Mountainous areas ==
Geographical features of South Korea

=== East high and West low ===
Korea is high in the east and low in the west. During the Cenozoic era, the crust spread widely on both sides in the middle of the Sea of Japan, and at this time, the land of Korea rose up under the power transmitted horizontally transmitted. In this process, the east rose higher than the west, forming the current topography of Donggo West. The Nangrim Mountains and Taebaek Mountains, which stretch north and south along the east coast, were also created during this period. And the high, rugged mountains, hills, and valleys developed widely around the two mountains.

If you go east along the Yeongdong Expressway, which runs from Incheon to Gangneung, and enter Gangwon Province, we can meet several tunnels. The reason why there are many tunnels is because of the topography of the east and west. There are many high and rough mountains in Gangwon-do in the east, so we had to make a tunnel through holes in the mountain to make a road. So tunnels are concentrated in the east, where there are many mountainous areas in Korea.

The topography of Donggo West and West also affected the flow of rivers. Since water flows from high to low, most rivers in Korea start from the east and flow to the west. South Korea's Han River, Geumgang River, and Yeongsan River, as well as North Korea's Daedong River and Yalu River, flow west. It also affected the development of the plains. Because plains are developed in the downstream of the river, the plains are spread out in the downstream of the river in the west.

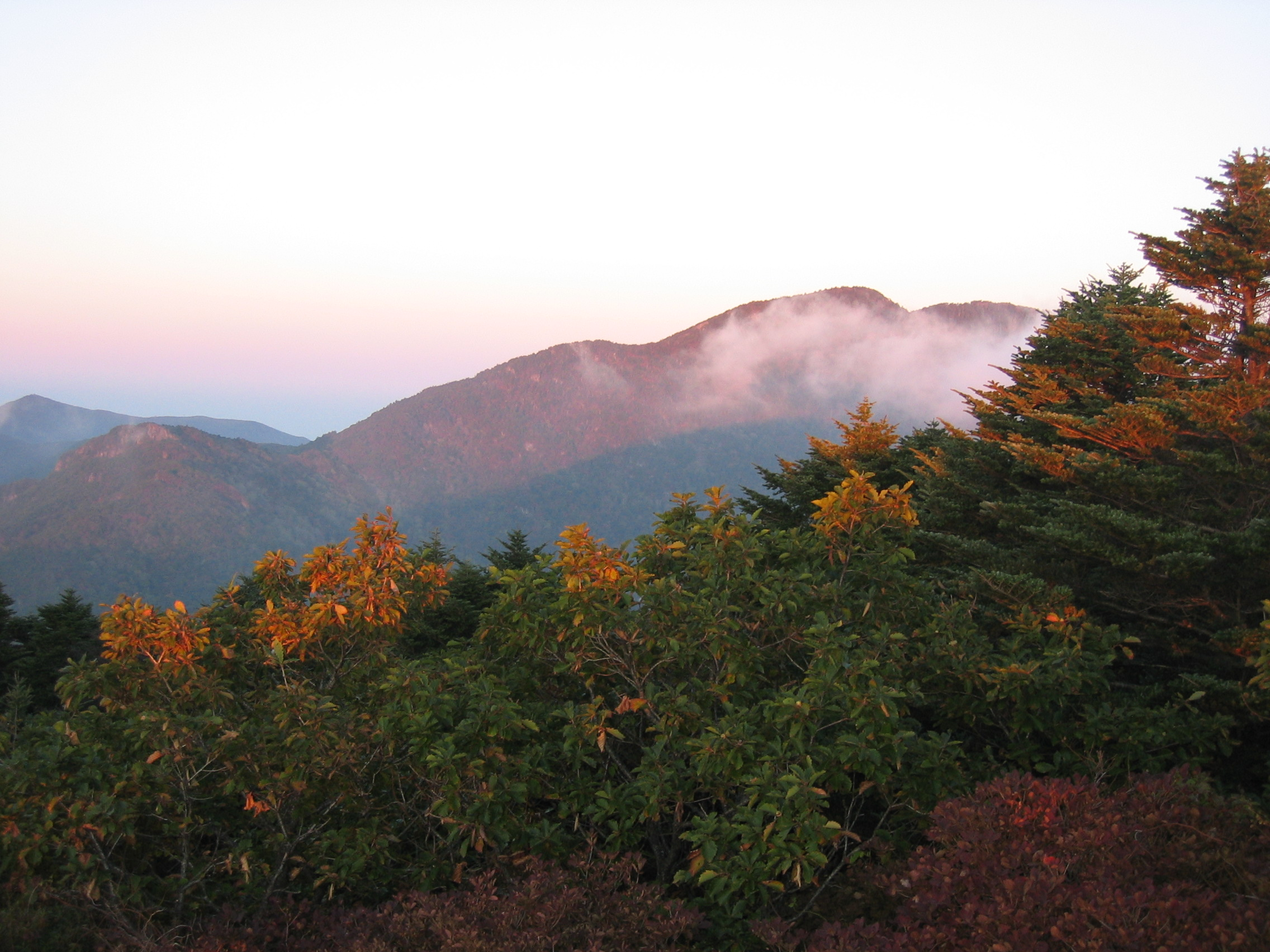
Jirisan National Park

- Jirisan. Jirisan is a mountain located in the southern region of South Korea. It is the second-tallest mountain in South Korea after Jeju Island's Hallasan, and the tallest mountain in mainland South Korea. The 1915 m-high mountain is located in Jirisan National Park. The park spans three provinces (North, South Jeolla and South Gyeongsang) and is the largest in South Korea. The largest proportion of the national park is in the province of South Gyeongsang. The highest peak of the mountain, Cheonwangbong is also located in this province. Another well-known peak is Samshin-bong (Three Spirits Peak). Jirisan is at the southern end of the Sobaek and Baekdudaegan mountain ranges, the "spine" of the Korean Peninsula incorporating the Sobaek mountain range and most of the Taebaek mountain range. There are seven major Buddhist temples on Jirisan. Hwaeomsa is the largest and best-known temple among these. It contains several national treasures, mostly stone artworks from about 600–900 CE. The mountain is also home to the Cheonghak-dong (Azure Crane Village) alpine valley, which includes the Samseonggung (Three Sages Palace), which is a site celebrating one of Korea's foundation myths. Every year, more than 280,000 people visit Jirisan. Summer and autumn are the most popular visiting seasons. The mountain is advertised as having ten scenic views. These are 'Sunrise from Cheonwang-bong peak', 'Nogodan Sea of Clouds', 'Banyabong's Nakjo', 'Full moon at Byukso-ryung', 'Piagol Autumn Leaves', 'Royal Azalea Blossoming', 'Chilseon Valley', 'Seomjincheongryu', 'Buril water fall', 'Yeonha-Sunkyung'. Jirisan National Park has several hiking routes.
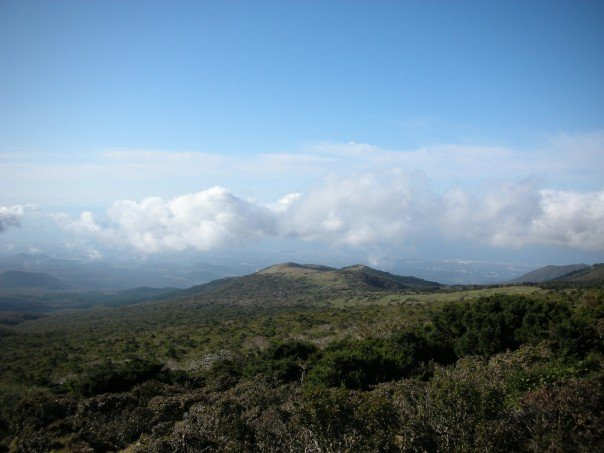
- Korea Mountain Hallasan
  Hallasan. Located on Jeju Island, the largest island in Korea, it is the highest mountain (1,947 m above sea level) within the effective territory of the Republic of Korea. It is one of the national parks of Korea. The entire national park has been designated a UNESCO World Heritage Site. And it is an active volcano at sea within the territory of effective control of the Republic of Korea. If you interpret the name, it means pulling the canal (the Milky Way, or the high sky), which means that it is a mountain high enough to hold the Milky Way. Along with Geumgangsan Mountain and Jirisan Mountain, it is considered one of the Three Gods of Korea.
- Seoraksan. Seoraksan is a mountain with an altitude of 1,708 m that spans Sokcho-si, Yangyang-gun, Inje-gun, and Goseong-gun, Gangwon-do. In Korea, it is the second-highest mountain after Hallasan and Jirisan. It was named like this because snow began to fall around Chuseok and melts only in summer. Seoraksan's natural protection area is rich in geological, topographic, animal, and plant resources to be specially preserved, and the scenery is very beautiful. In addition, since it is one of Korea's representative mountains with many cultural heritages such as traditional temples, the entire Seoraksan is designated and protected as a natural monument.
- Taebaeksan. Taebaeksan is a national mountain that rises in the center of Baekdu-daegan Range, and is a root mountain that becomes a lifeline south of the Korean Peninsula, where the Han River, Nakdong River, and Osipcheon Stream in Samcheok originate. Taebaeksan consists of Yeongbong Peak (1,560 m), Janggunbong Peak (1567 m) in the north, Munsubong Peak (1,517 m) in the east, and Busebong Peak (1,546 m) between Yeongbong Peak and Munsubong Peak, and the highest peak is Hambaeksan (1,572 m). Many alpine plants grow naturally at the top of Taebaeksan. In particular, it is famous as one of the most prominent colonies in Korea, and in spring, azalea colonies greet hikers, and in summer, dense trees and cold and clean valley water are enough to forget the midsummer heat, and in autumn, it is decorated with colorful autumn leaves, and winter is made up of a magnificent land. In addition, the sunrise from the top is beautiful, and you can see the Sea of Japan far away on a clear day is also a pride of Taebaeksan.

== The four major rivers in South Korea ==
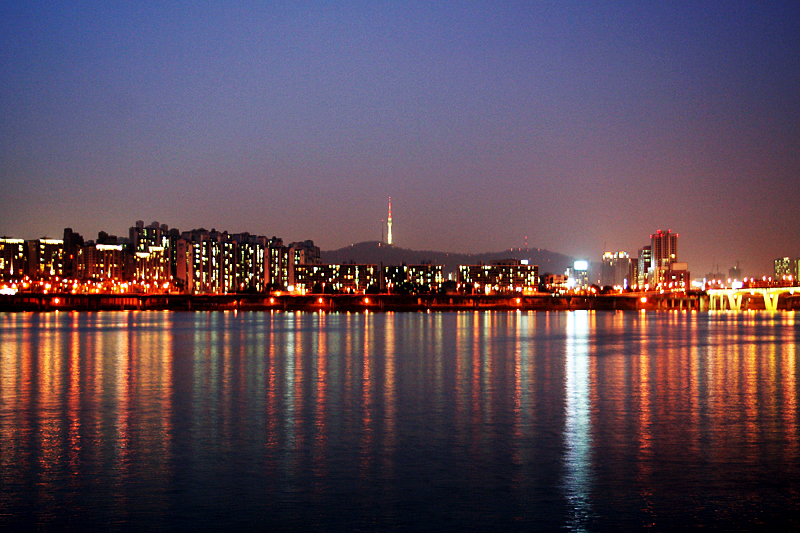
Hangang River

In Korean rivers, the watershed is biased toward the east coast, so the rivers flowing into the Sea of Japan are short and there are many rapid currents, but the rivers flowing west or southwest are gentle and long. Usually, rivers flow through the old valley and semi-plain to form an extremely gentle equilibrium river, and erosion basins, floodplains, and natural embankments are developed in the middle and downstream due to long-term erosion, and there are many places that form a river terrace in the upper stream. Due to the uneven distribution of precipitation according to the season, it is difficult to develop and use the river due to the large change in rainfall, especially due to the heavy rains in the summer, which accumulates in the lower part of the river, causing frequent flooding.

- There are four major rivers in Korea: the Han River, the Nakdong River, the Geumgang River, and the Yeongsan River. Korea's national rivers are classified into five areas, including the Seomjin River, but they are excluded from the small amount of Seomjin River. When dividing the national rivers into five areas, it is not consistent with the water system, such as Anseongcheon Stream entering the Han River area.
- Although it seems that the concept of combining the four large and important rivers was created in modern times, Silla designated Sadok as one of the four major rivers in the country and regularly held the Jungsa ritual, and among the four rivers, the Han River (Hansanha), Nakdong River (Hwangsanha), and Geum River (Ungcheonha) overlap with the four rivers of Korea. The perception that it is a large and important river has already existed since ancient times. In Joseon, the Han River, Nakdong River, Paek River, and Yongheung River were designated as Sadok.
- During the Park Chung-hee administration, many dams were built by comprehensive development of the four major river basins. During the Roh Moo Hyun administration, the river maintenance and damage prevention were focused. The Lee Myung Bak government promoted a project to improve the four major rivers with the main contents of river dredging, bicycle path construction, and beam construction, and as a result, a huge scale of beams and dredging was achieved in the four major rivers. The most recent four-river maintenance project is also called simply the four-river.

== Wetlands and national parks (ecology) ==
=== Wetlands ===
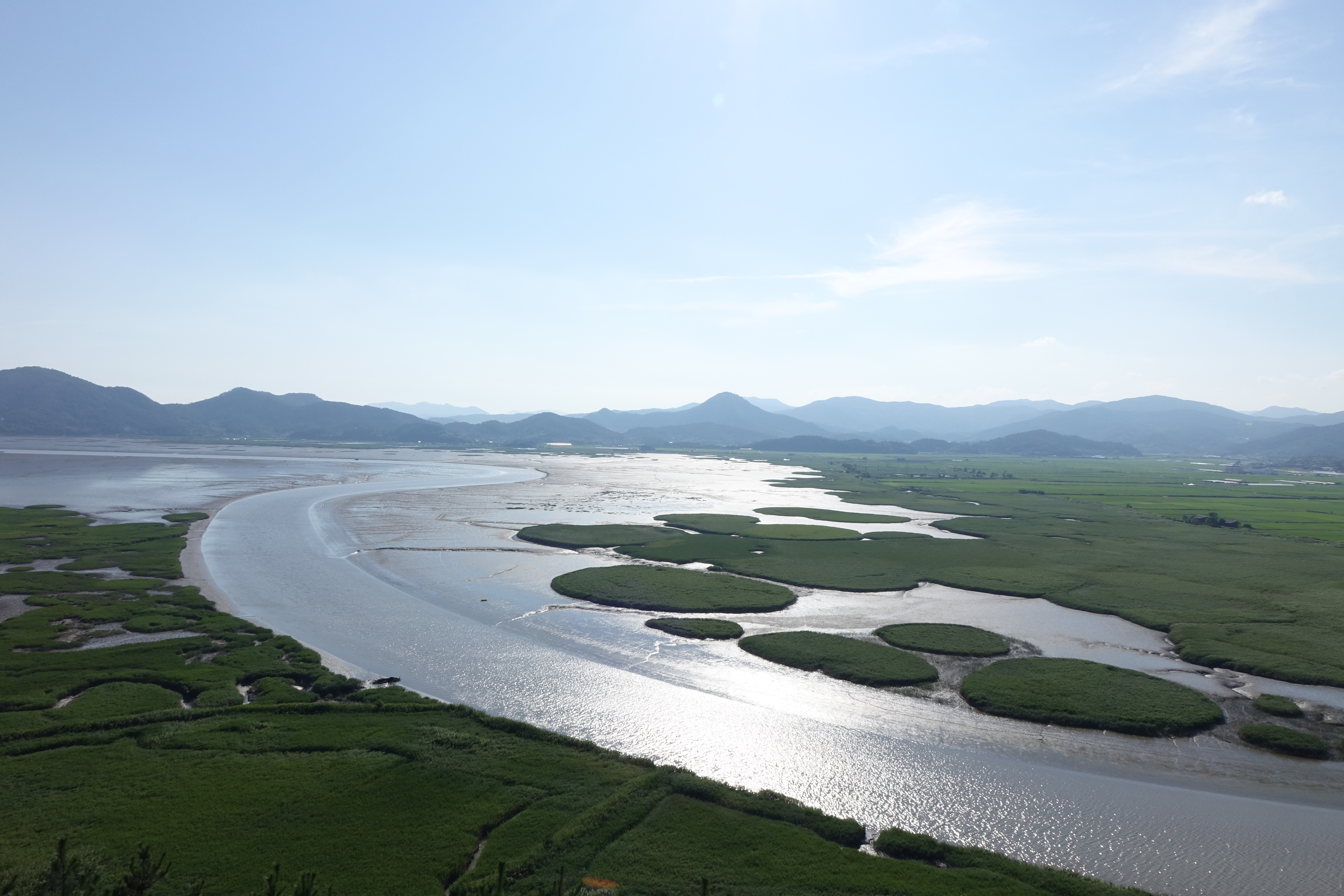
Suncheon Bay

There are a total of 24 Ramsar registered wetlands in South Korea. First, the Ramsar Convention is the first international agreement on conservation and wise use of natural resources and habitats, and it presents basic directions for conservation and wise use of wetland resources.

The types are Daeamsan Yong Wetland, Upo Wetland, Jangdo Wetland, Suncheonman Bay and Boseong Mudflats, Jeju Mulyeongari Wetland, Duung Wetland, Mujechi Wetland, Muan Mudflat, Jeju Muljang Orio Wetland, Jeju 1100 Wetland, Seocheon Mudflat, Gochang Wetland, Dongbangdo Island, and Daebangdo Wetland.

Suncheonman Bay, which is well-known as a representative coastal wetland in Korea, is formed on Daedo Island, Suncheon-si, Jeollanam-do. Suncheon Bay Wetland is a representative ecotourism destination in Korea, as it was designated as a must-see list in the 2011 Michelin Green Guide Korean edition. At low tide, the wide tidal flats around the estuary are exposed, making it a destination for various migratory birds, and the Dongcheon Estuary turns into a deep tidal valley. Rice paddies, salt fields, tidal villages, aquaculture fields, low hills, and mountains are adjacent to the surrounding land, forming a unique ecosystem, scenery, and culture. In particular, the area of Suncheonman Bay tidal flat is 22.21 km^{2}, of which reed colonies account for 2.3 km^{2}.

=== National Parks ===
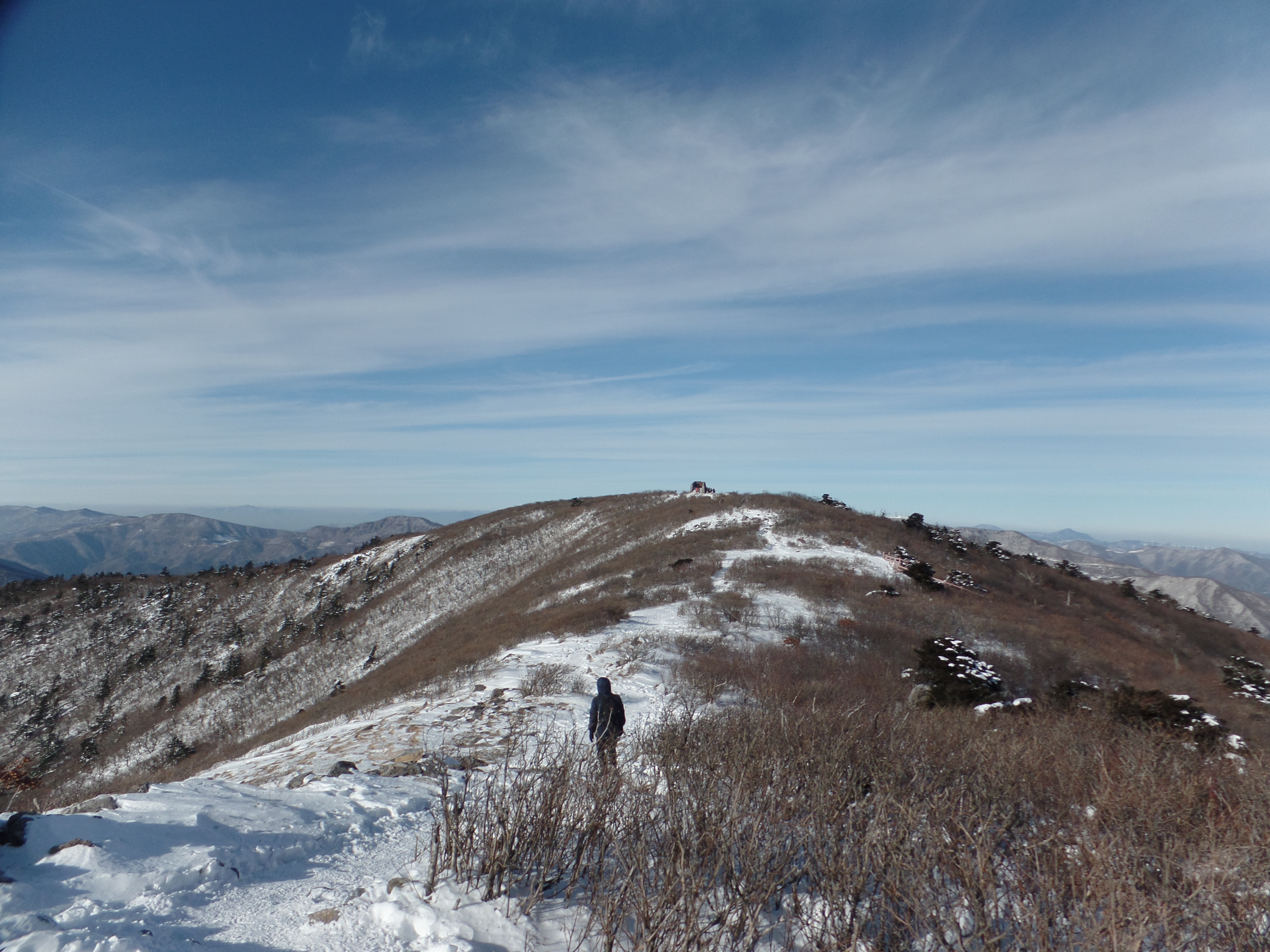
Taebaeksan

The national parks of South Korea are as follows. It refers to a park designated and managed by the state for the purpose of protecting and fostering representative scenic spots of the state and contributing to the improvement of people's health, rest and emotional life. The national park is a designated natural landscape representing Korea's landscape, including natural scenery, historic historical sites, and protecting rare animals and plants. In Korea, after consulting with representatives of related ministries and offices to hear the opinions of the competent governor, it is designated by the Minister of Environment after deliberation by the National Land Construction Comprehensive Development Council. Therefore, the Minister of Environment decides on the park plan to promote the efficient protection and use of the park.

In addition to Jirisan Mountain, there are Gyeongju, Gyeryongsan Mountain, Hallyeohaesang, Songnisan Mountain, Hallasan Mountain, Seoraksan Mountain, Naejangsan Mountain, Gayasan Mountain, Odaesan Mountain, Deokyusan Mountain, Juwangsan Mountain, Taean Coast, Dadohaean Mountain, Bukhansan Mountain, Woraksan Mountain, Wolchulsan Mountain, Byeonsan Peninsula, Mudeungsan Mountain, and Taebaeksan National Park.

The representative national park of Korea is Juwangsan National Park. Developed at the end of the Taebaek Mountain Range, this place is famous for its strange rocks and bizarre stones surrounded like a bottle, and it is said that King Juwon, the prince of Silla, lived and practiced asceticism. The tourist resources here include Zahaseong Fortress at the foot of the mountain, as well as Giam, Zahaam, Juwanggul Cave, and Haksodae, and Dalgi Mineral Spring is also famous nearby.

== The social environment ==
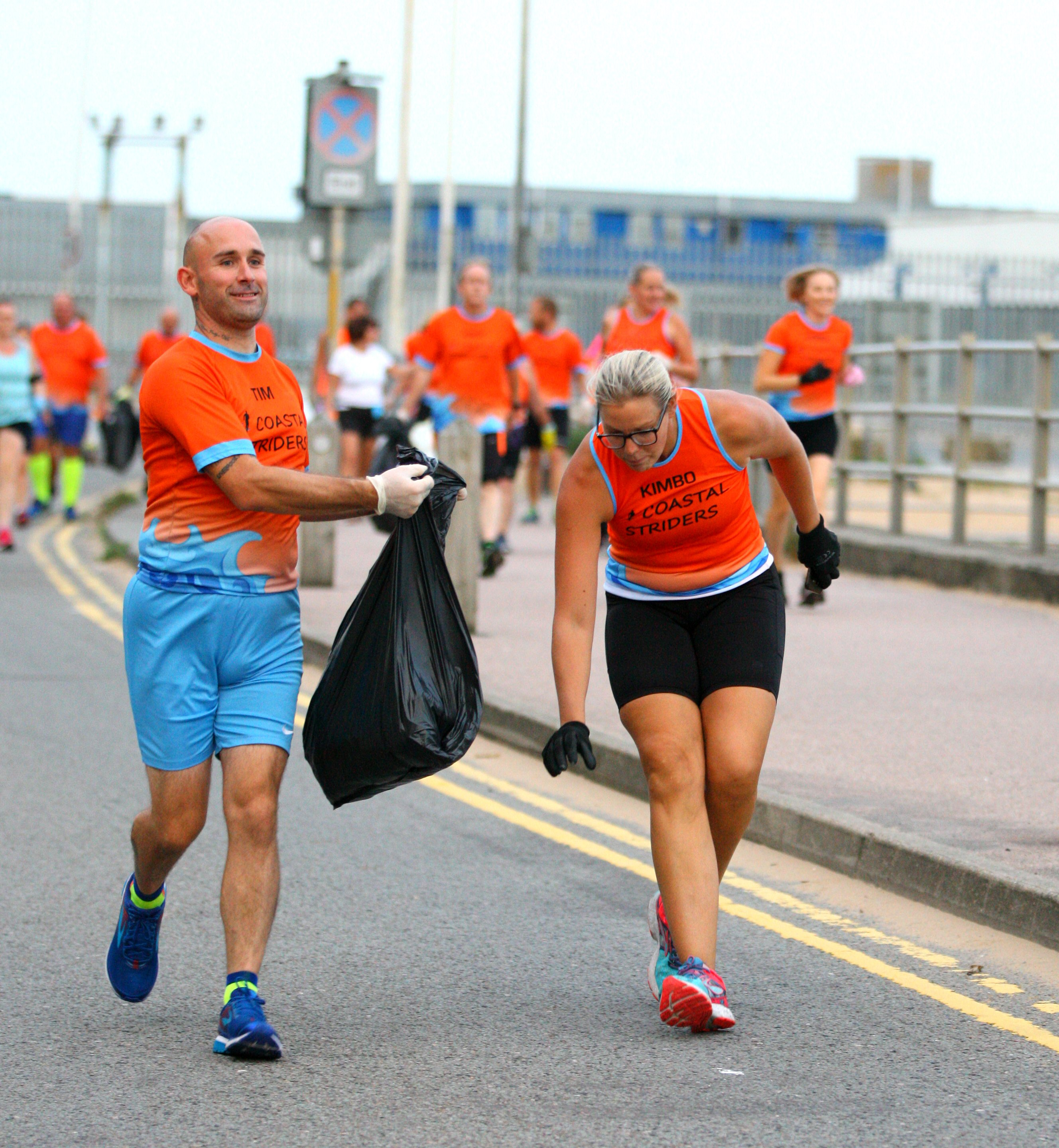
Flogging with Coastal Striders

== Flogging ==
Floating is the activity of jogging and picking up trash, which protects health and the environment together. It first started in Sweden in 2016. The meaning of the term is also a flogging made by combining 'pick up' and 'jogging' in Swedish. In Korean, the term 'picking up' is also used. It is a job to pick up conspicuous garbage and clean it while jogging, and it can be seen as an environmental protection movement that takes care of health at the same time as exercise.

Recently, along with ESG management, flogging campaigns have been carried out in various places such as local governments, public institutions, companies, and organizations. In addition, flogging websites, communities, and small groups were formed. Flogging campaigns are steadily and widely spreading through SNS.

Examples of floating include Samyang Group's flogging activities, a flogging mountaineering club with celebrities, and Jeju Olle Trail flogging day. Changing the perception of small citizens through flogging and leading actions are the solutions for environmental problems. Therefore, it is time to recognize and respond to this.

== Carbon neutrality (2050 policy) ==
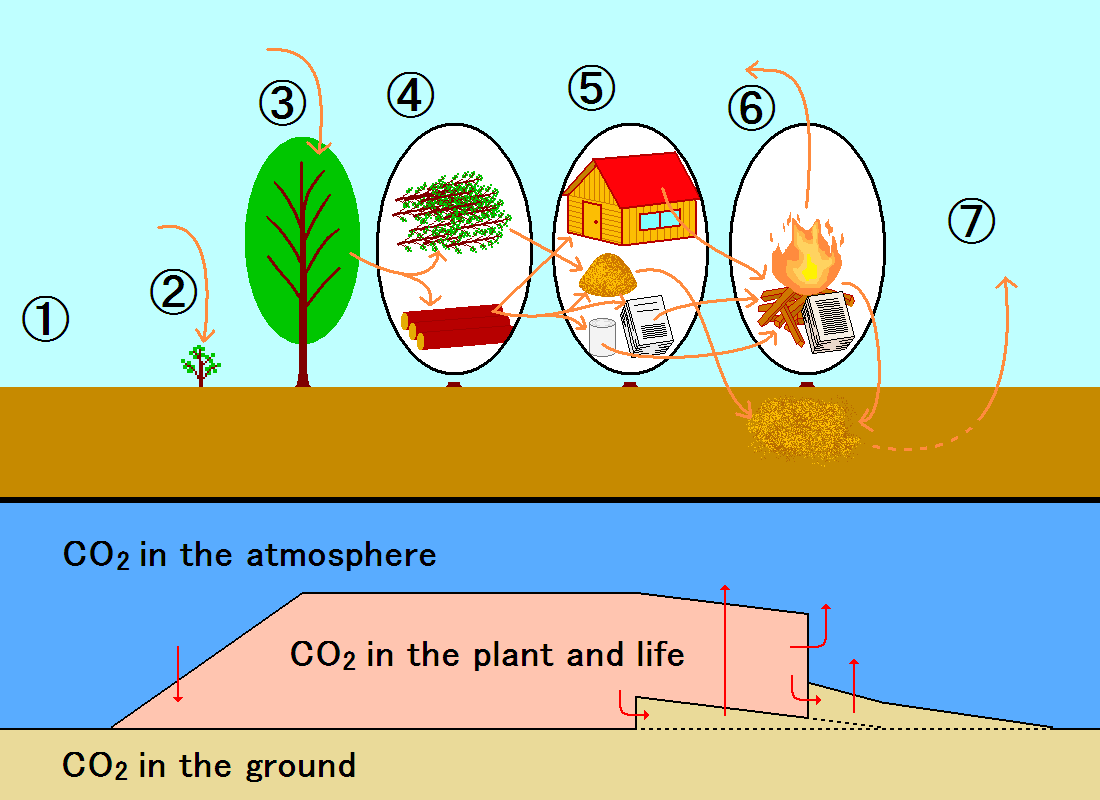
Carbon neutral and carbon cycle

Carbon neutrality is the concept of making the actual emission of carbon dioxide "zero" by taking measures to absorb carbon dioxide as much as it emits carbon dioxide. Carbon neutrality is also called carbon zero. The main purpose is to reduce or eliminate greenhouse gas emissions to prevent global warming. Since the late 2010s, ESG management has become a hot topic, and as domestic carbon emission rights and carbon borders between countries have emerged, each company declared RE100. Here, RE100 stands for Renewable Energy 100, and refers to an international enterprise-to-business agreement project to replace 100% of the electricity used by companies with renewable energy by 2050. To achieve this, it is necessary to use only power generated from renewable energy or to purchase a certificate of supply of renewable energy (REC) as much as the power used.

The domestic policy situation of the Republic of Korea is as follows. In February 2020, the 'Low Carbon Social Vision Forum', which consists of 100 experts, submitted a report to the Ministry of Environment. Based on this, 15 government ministries were created. On October 28, 2020, President Moon Jae In announced the "2050 Carbon Neutrality Declaration" at the plenary session of the National Assembly. On January 19, 2022, the Ministry of Environment presented four major goals this year: establishing a basic carbon-neutral green growth plan, implementing a carbon-neutral practice point system, creating a green converting economic ecosystem, and fostering 1,300 high-quality workers.

In 2021, Ssangyong C&E declared de-coal management to be the first in the industry to reduce the amount of bituminous coal used to '0'. It also announced that it will invest a total of 282 billion won by 2030 to make large-scale facility investments. In addition, Hyundai Motor has released a video on carbon neutrality. In his New Year's address in 2022, Chae Hee-bong, president of the Korea Gas Corporation, cited carbon neutrality as a project for carbon neutrality this year, especially related to the environment of "introduction of overseas green hydrogen, mixing natural gas pipes and hydrogen".

== Environmental problems ==
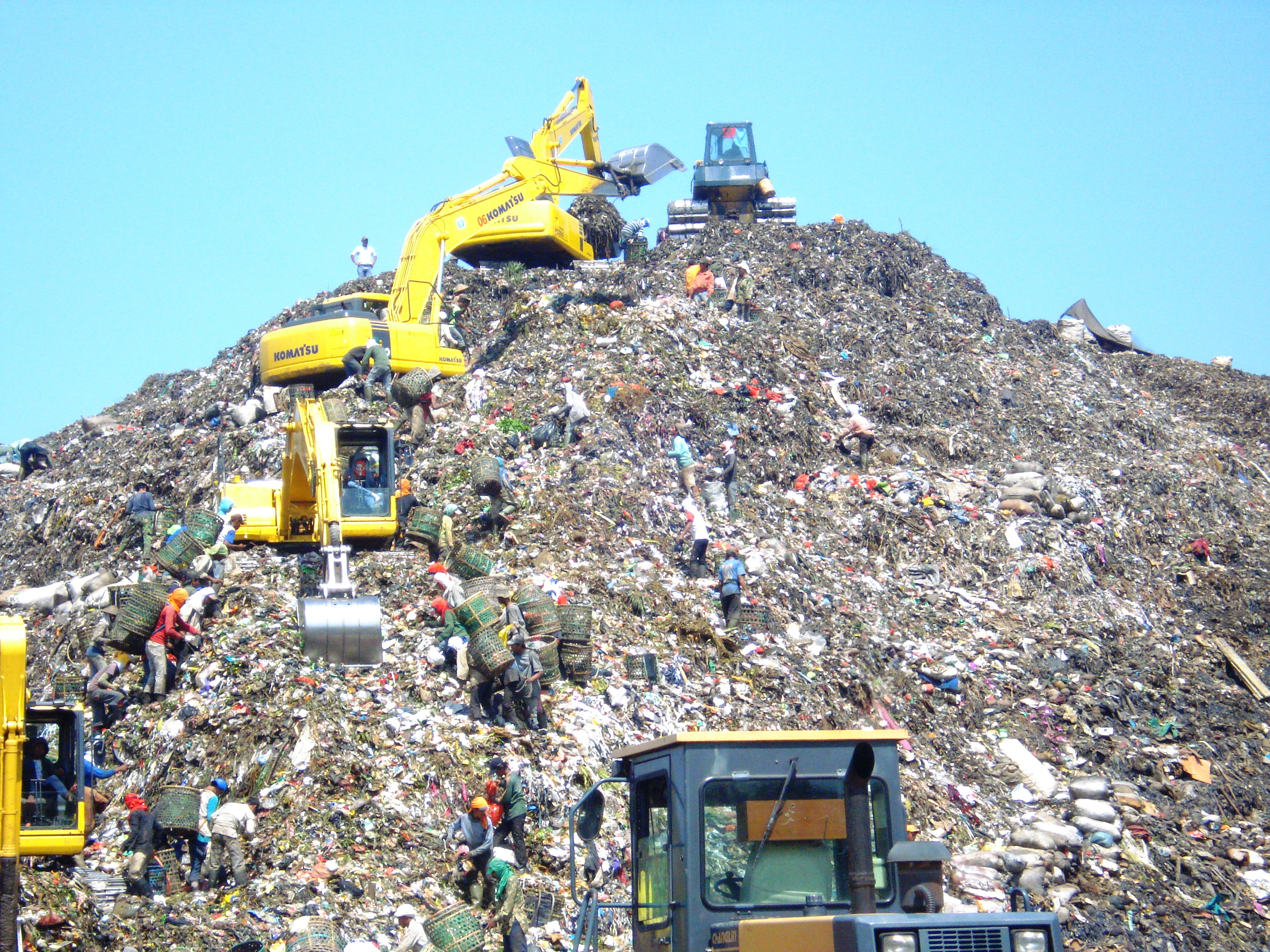
A mountain of garbage

Korea has a lot of social contradictions and careers as it is rapidly industrialized and is rushing to grow into an advanced country. Particularly serious is the environmental issue. A representative example that can explain Korea's environmental pollution is the Nakdong River phenol pollution incident by Doosan Electronics in 1991. Due to this incident, water sources in Daegu and Busan were contaminated, and tap water could not be consumed for several days.

The garbage problem is also being treated as a major challenge for the city. In the meantime, nearly 400 "waste mountains" with illegal waste have been created throughout the country. Local governments sometimes have serious disputes in Seoul, Incheon, and Gyeonggi Province because they cannot find a place to throw away garbage. This is worth calling a 'waste mess'. The problem of automobile exhaust is also an urgent problem that cannot be neglected.

Recently, according to an analysis of the "2019 World Air Quality Report" published by Air Visual, a global air pollution research institute, Korea ranked first among OECD members and was the worst air pollution country. Since such air pollution has been affected by weather conditions, the number of days of high-concentration fine dust in Korea is continuously increasing. Therefore, it is time to respond strongly to the climate crisis to reduce atmospheric congestion caused by climate change, and a ban on fossil fuel reduction and use is suggested as a fundamental solution. Greenhouse gas reduction should also be considered at the same time as reducing air pollutants.

Posters on climate change

== Climate crisis ==
Korea faces a big climate crisis. According to several international official reports, South Korea is expected to experience more frequent storms and problems as sea levels rise, even if various measures are taken. And if the sea level rises by 2 to 3 meters, cities that seemed irrelevant will be greatly affected.

The climate crisis also affects domestic agriculture. Among the changes caused by the climate crisis, water shortage is the factor that will affect domestic agriculture the most. Although precipitation increases due to the climate crisis, drought persists for crops as rainfall patterns change differently than they do now. In addition, the amount of water that rains naturally supply to arable land is expected to decrease significantly, so the damage from the climate crisis is expected to become more and more serious.

=== Climate policy: related to current legislation ===
- The Republic of Korea is actively responding to climate change, recognizing that climate change is not a "burden" but an "opportunity to create a new economic growth engine". Korea presented a voluntary goal of reducing greenhouse gas emissions by 30% compared to the 2020 Business As User (BAU) in 2009, and enacted the Framework Act on Low Carbon Green Growth in 2011 to lay the legal foundation for the implementation of the goal. Since then, efforts have been made to implement greenhouse gas and energy target management in 2012, establish a roadmap for greenhouse gas reduction in 2014, implement an emission trading system in 2015, and prepare measures to adapt to national climate change in 2010 and 2015.
- In the climate change negotiations, the Republic of Korea is striving to actively contribute to responding to climate change, a common task for mankind, while reflecting our industrial conditions as much as possible. In addition, efforts have been made to contribute constructively to the creation of a new climate system as a bridge between developed and developing countries by promoting actions and contributions corresponding to the leadership of developed countries and the ability of developing countries, while considering the historical responsibilities of developed countries and the trend of increasing emissions.
- To participate in the international community's efforts to respond to climate change, the Republic of Korea completed the domestic ratification process of the Paris Agreement on November 3, 2016, deposited the ratification with the United Nations, and took effect in Korea on December 3. The core of the new climate system, in which all countries participate extensively, is the Nationally Determined Contribution (NDC) that each country prepares in consideration of its own situation. To contribute to the conclusion of the Paris Agreement, the Republic of Korea submitted a national contribution plan (INDC) in June 2015, including a 37% reduction in greenhouse gas emissions outlook (BAU) by 2030, and the INDC was registered as an official NDC on November 3, 2016.
- To achieve the 2030 national greenhouse gas reduction target, the 1st Framework Plan for Climate Change Response and the 2030 National Greenhouse Gas Reduction Roadmap were established in December 2016, and the 2030 National Greenhouse Gas Reduction Basic Roadmap Amendment was prepared in July 2018. In October 2019, the second basic plan for responding to climate change was established to strengthen the overall response system to climate change and establish an early inspection and evaluation system for implementation of the 2030 National Greenhouse Gas Reduction Roadmap. In addition, Korea submitted a 2030 NDC renewal plan on December 30, 2020, including the goal of revising the existing BAU-style NDC in an absolute manner and reducing 24.4% from 2017 by 2030. Furthermore, to contribute to the achievement of the 2050 carbon neutrality target, Korea announced a 2030 NDC increase plan to reduce 40% from 2018 by 2030 at COP26 held in Glasgow, England, in October 2021, and submitted it to the United Nations in December 2021.
- Recognizing that climate finance is an essential factor in building trust between developed and developing countries, the Republic of Korea is also actively working in the field of climate finance, a major issue in climate change negotiations, with the attraction of the Green Climate Fund (GCF) Secretariat. At the UN Climate Summit held in September 2014, Korea played a co-chair of the Climate Finance session with Mexico, and announced a $100 million contribution pledge to GCF to play a leading role in creating initial GCF funding. At the GCF High-Level Grant Meeting held in Paris, France in October 2019, the GCF decided to replenish its first financial resources, and the Republic of Korea pledged to contribute $200 million, twice as much as its initial financial resources.
- Our government will continue its pan-governmental efforts to realize the 2030 NDC and 2050 carbon neutrality targets set for the Paris Agreement 1.5-degree targets. In particular, we will continue to strengthen our leadership in responding to climate change as a global hub country by faithfully implementing the agreements reached in international discussions such as COP26. At the same time, it will continue to supplement Korea's climate policy and actively share model policies with developing countries to play a bridge between developed and developing countries, contributing to the achievement of inclusive carbon neutrality in the international community.

Key documents on climate change negotiations
The names of the negotiations	The year	References
United Nations Framework Convention on Climate Change	1992.6	
Kyoto Protocol	1997.12	
Bali Action Plan	2007.12	
Copenhagen Accord	2009.12	
Cancun Agreements LCA	2010.12	
Durban Platform	2011.12	
Doha Gateway	2012.12	
Warsaw Outcomes	2013.11	
Lima Declaration	2014.12	
Paris Agreement	2015.12	

== Global warming ==
Global Warming

Global Average Temperature

Global warming is a problem that is applied to Korea as well as the world. Global warming means that the global average surface temperature rises over a long period of time in a broad sense. Compared to 1850, the average global surface temperature has risen by more than 1 degree and is steadily increasing.

Global warming started with the start of industrialization. At the beginning of the Industrial Revolution, the concentration of carbon dioxide in the atmosphere was 280 ppm. However, it increased exponentially after the Industrial Revolution, reaching about 405 ppm in December 2017. If there are no regulations on carbon dioxide emissions in the future, it is estimated to exceed about 450 ppm by 2050. Modern global warming is evaluated to be due to the increase in greenhouse gases containing carbon dioxide due to human activities.

The situation of global warming in Korea is as follows. Korea's climate is an appropriate mix of cold and temperate zones, where four seasons are clearly visible. However, in the summer of 2007, we discovered that our country's climate was entering a subtropical climate more than ever before. Recently, the summer weather in Korea has weakened the rainy season in July, but the phenomenon of localized torrential rains in August is becoming remarkable. In the past, precipitation in Korea was concentrated during the rainy season from late June to late July, but recently, precipitation was concentrated in late July and August, resulting in a reversal. In other words, this change in climate shows that the average surface temperature in Korea has increased.

In addition, abnormal climate phenomena have been frequently seen in Korea recently. Even though the weather is clear, dark clouds suddenly come and pour out rain, and the sun rises again as if it were ever. In addition, drought occurred in spring, the rainy season was prolonged, and flooding occurred. This climate change is expected to threaten various ecosystems and have a great impact on our lives.

== Air pollution ==
Air pollution in Korea is increasingly a threat to people and the environment. Air pollution starts with many causes, both at home and international. Since rapid industrialization, many forms of pollution have increased, especially in Seoul and other cities. Seoul is one of the most polluted cities, according to the National Aeronautics and Space Administration (NASA) Since 2009 and 2013, the city's average PM10 has been higher than many large cities around the world, such as Los Angeles, Tokyo, Paris, and London. In addition, it is estimated that about 16% of the deaths in 2010 in the Seoul metropolitan area were air quality. This has led to health and environmental problems. Koreans are buying masks and air purifiers to breathe cleaner air, and trying to reduce Korea's air pollution emissions.

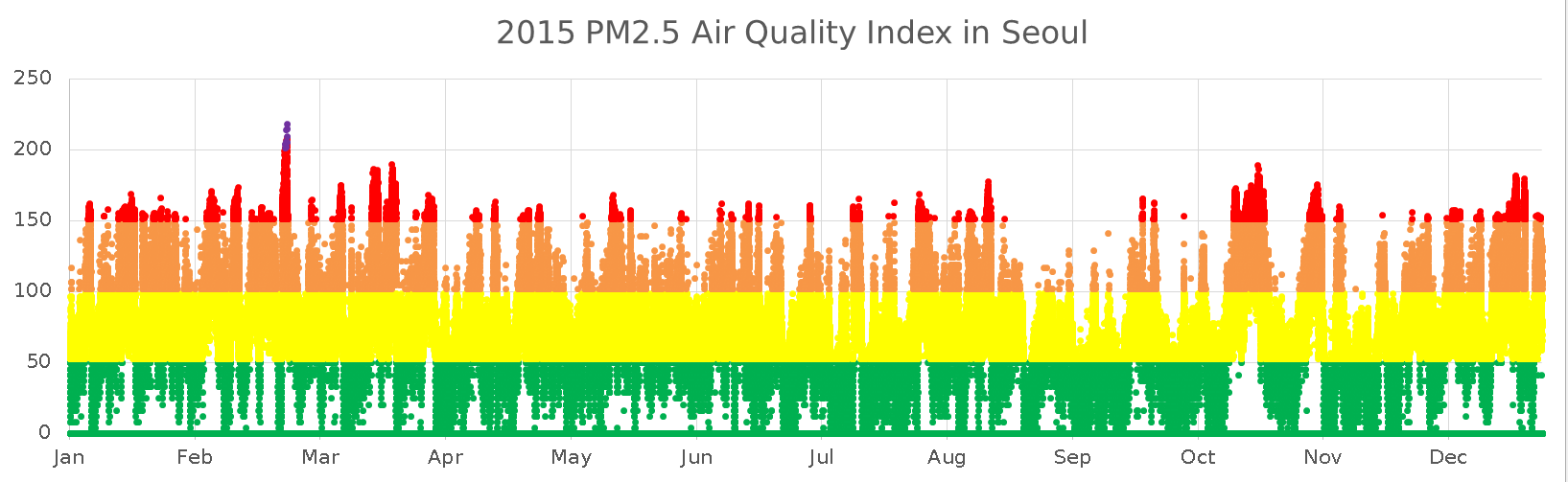
Air quality index in Seoul (2015)

=== Causes of air pollution ===
Pollution in Korea has increased since World War II. In 1960, Korea was still a developing country with few manufacturing industries and was heavily dependent on foreign aid. South Korean society began a major transition from an agricultural economy to an industrial economy, which was accelerated only by the Korean War. In the aftermath of the war, the United States provided significant aid to South Korea through the sponsorship of the United Nations Reconstruction Organization of Korea. The Korean economy, once a newly industrialized nation, grew by 10% annually until the 1980s and 1990s. Today, Korea is a manufacturing and export powerhouse, the world's 11th-largest gross domestic producer as of 2015, but this has been driven by coal-fired power generation and high vehicle emissions. The rapid growth has contributed to Korea's major air pollution, including diesel vehicles, construction equipment, heating and cooling, and power plants.

=== Deaths from fine dust from fossil fuel ===
The number of deaths from fossil fuel fine dust (2012) was the second highest in India (2.5 million) after China (3.9 million), but Bangladesh (36.5%) was the second highest after China (40.2%). Korea's fossil fuel fine dust mortality rate was the fourth highest at 30.5%. Looking at the death rate grid distribution, it was found that 4,000 to 5,000 people die annually in the metropolitan area. The average annual concentration of ultra fine dust was the highest in China with 62.9 μg/m^{3}, followed by Bangladesh (52.3%), India (42.9%), and Korea (38.8%). The concentration of ultra fine dust in North Korea was also high at 30.5 μg/m^{3}, resulting in a 26.2% death rate of fine dust in fossil fuels.

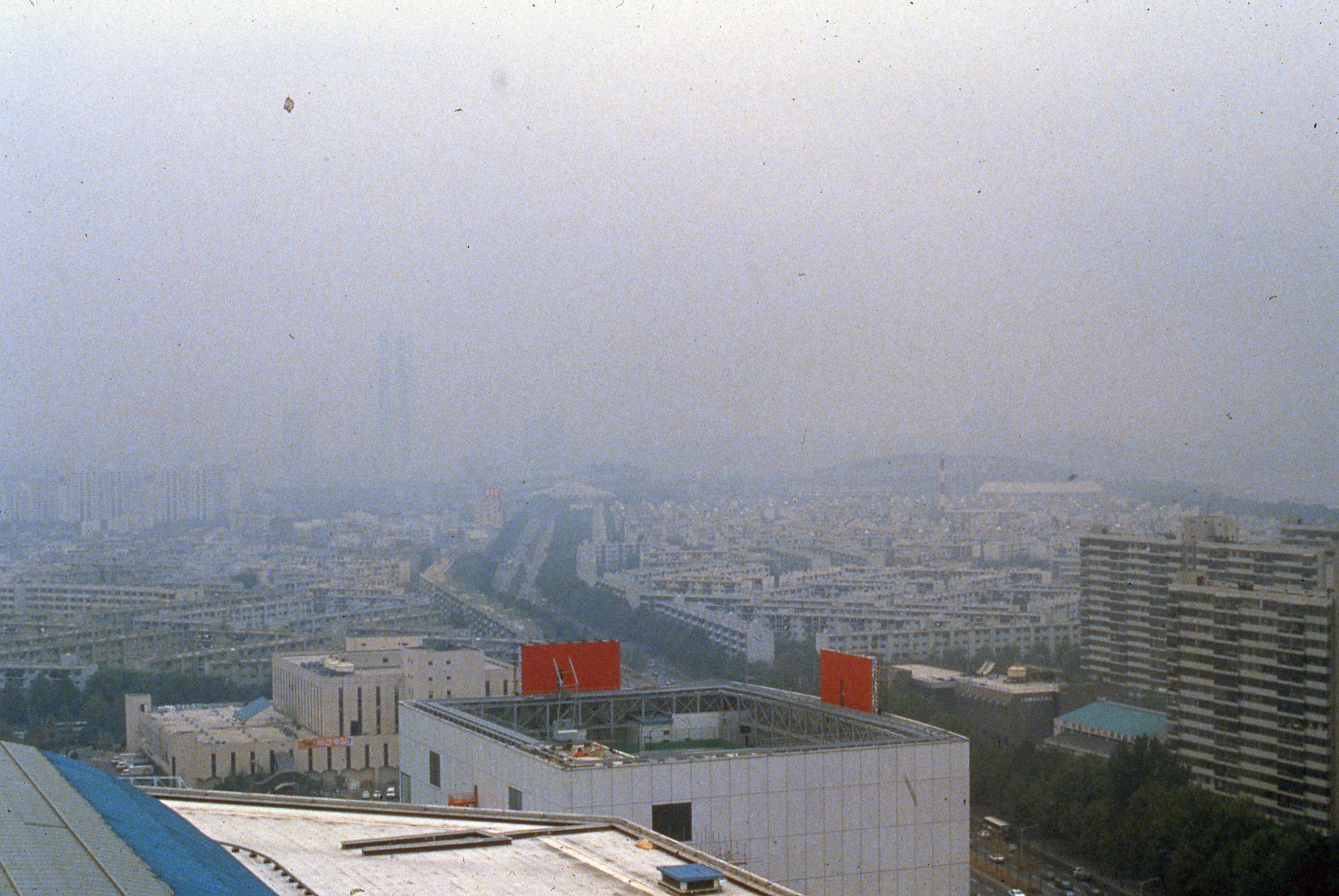
Seoul paralympic stadium contaminated with air

=== Government regulations on air pollution ===
- Since the signing of the Paris Agreement in 2016, Korea has been putting its life and soul on air cleaning. Moon Jae In plans to reduce domestic emissions by 30% by 2022 as President Moon Jae in has vowed to shut down old coal power plants in parallel with the establishment of new coal power plants. The Korean government plans to provide air-cleaning systems to public facilities and schools, consisting of air purifiers and air purifiers. On polluted days, the government bans heavy vehicles and old diesel vehicles. In 2018, high levels of pollution were observed as public transportation was available for free for three days in Seoul. The aim was to reduce the use of cars in the city. However, the measure failed because there was no big difference.
- At the local level, Korean cities have many bike paths, pedestrian-only areas, and five miles of linear parks. Diesel buses are being replaced by natural gas vehicles, and emission reduction devices are being provided to automobiles.
- In December 2003, the government implemented a special law on improving air quality in the Seoul metropolitan area to improve air quality in the metropolitan area. The Phase 1 Aviation Management Plan was implemented in 2005 for almost 10 years (2005–2014). The metropolitan area is a metropolitan area that includes Seoul, Incheon, and Gyeonggi Province. To be exact, pollutants were selected as PM10, nitrogen oxide, sulfur oxide, and volatile organic compound. More precisely, its goal was to reduce the annual average concentration of PM10 and NO_{2} from 69 μg/m^{3} to 40 μg/m^{3} by 2014.

== Water pollution ==
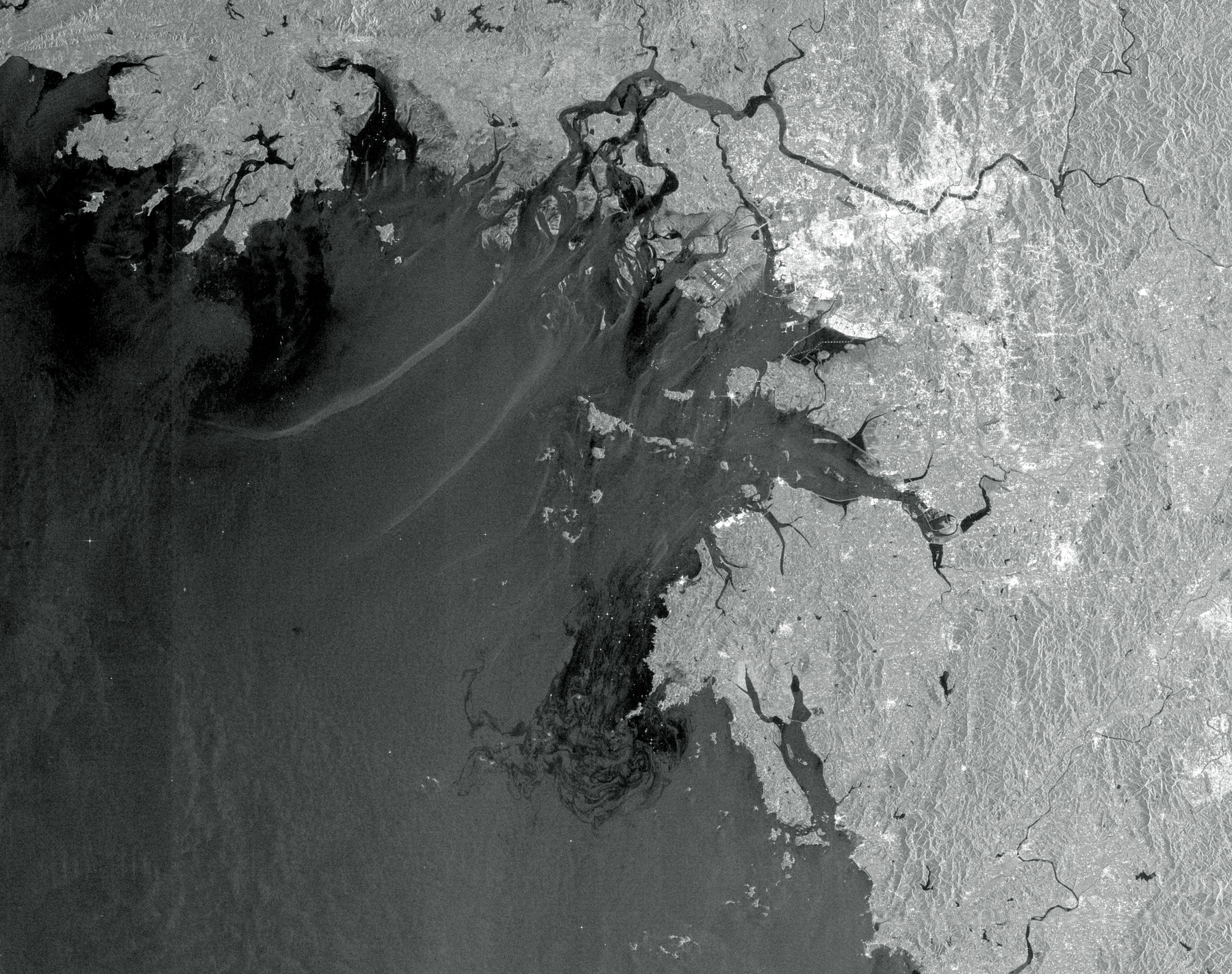
Water pollution from oil spills on the west coast

The topography of the Korean Peninsula has the characteristics of east, west, and west. In other words, there are high mountain ranges in the east and most of the large rivers in the west, forming a granary where rice paddy farming can develop greatly. In the 1970s, the Park Chung-hee administration promoted a reclamation project to achieve national revival. In other words, in 1961, the Public Water Reclamation Act was enacted, and a reclamation project to secure farmland and agricultural water by blocking the estuary of the river and tidal flats flowing into the Yellow Sea was carried out extensively. Moreover, two-thirds of the precipitation in Korea falls at once during the summer rainy season and goes down to the sea. Therefore, if an artificial lake that can store water flowing in the stream is not created, it will inevitably suffer from a serious lack of water. Therefore, there are 3,960 small and medium-sized rivers in Korea, with 18,800 appeals. However, there are only five natural appeals, and the rest are formed by artificial structures such as dams, estuaries, and reservoirs.

Korea's total annual water resources are 127.6 billion tons, of which 45 percent, or 54.5 billion tons, are lost due to evaporation and penetration, and 39 percent, or 49.3 billion tons, are lost to the sea in the event of flooding. However, only 23.8 billion tons, or 18%, are usually leaked, so the total usage is far below 33.1 billion tons. Therefore, water use is 16.1 billion tons of river water, 13.3 billion tons of dam use, and 3.7 billion tons of groundwater use, which is a financial burden to solve the water shortage problem. By use, it is divided into 15.8 billion tons of agricultural water (48%), 7.3 billion tons of living water (22%), 2.9 billion tons of industrial water (9%), and 7.1 billion tons of maintenance water (21%).

Meanwhile, 18,800 appeals in Korea are actually turning into hotbeds of water pollution. On top of that, a huge reservoir has been installed to promote the development of the four major rivers, and all parts of the country are suffering from serious water pollution.

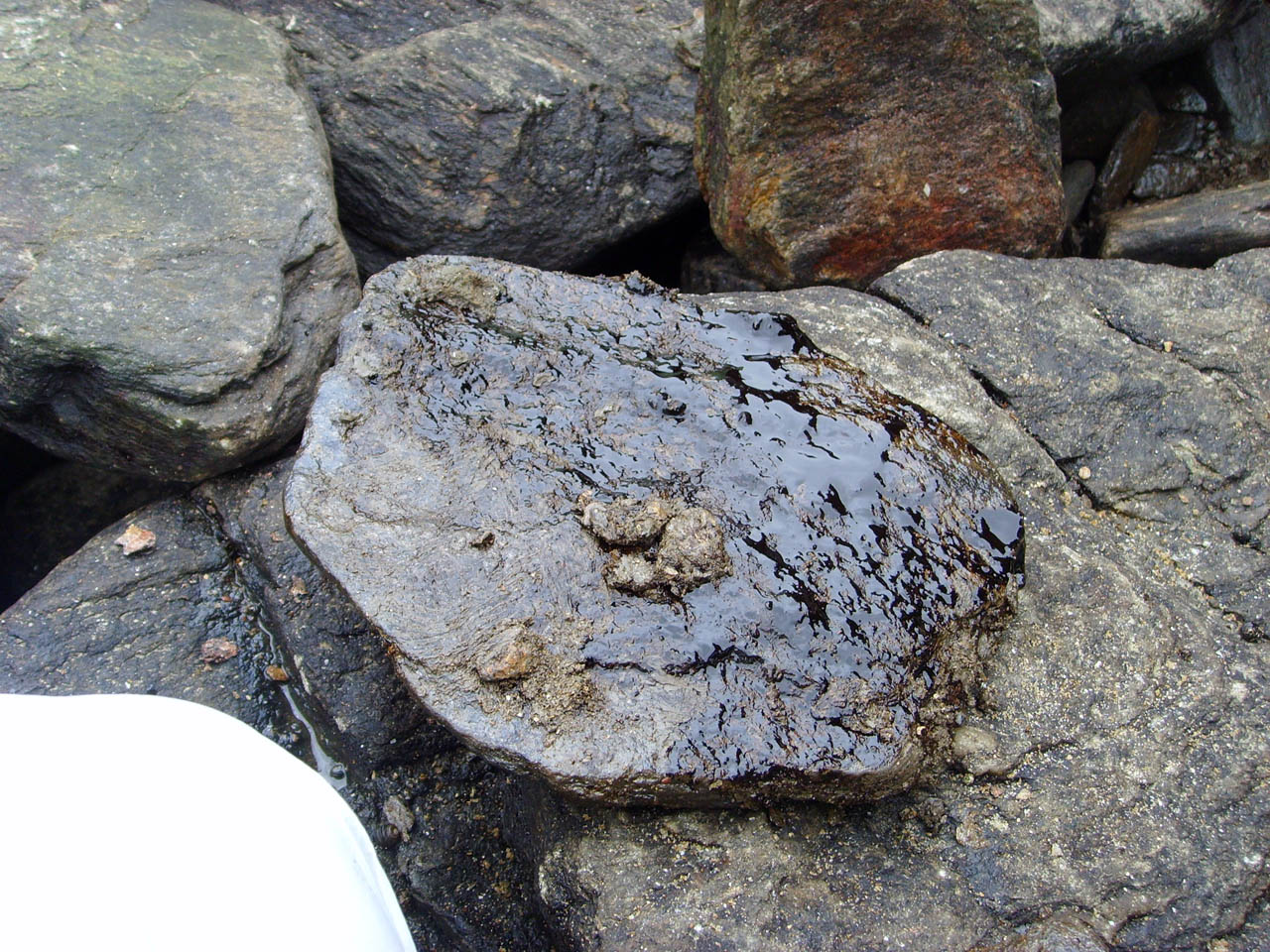
An oiled figure on a stone

- The lake is almost a closed space, so even if a small amount of organic and inorganic substances are introduced, the outflow path is blocked, and pollutants continue to accumulate. Therefore, as the day goes by, the water pollution level of the appeal is bound to intensify. In the end, the government belatedly learned the truth that non-flowing water is bound to be mixed, and is preparing to solve the water pollution problem of the appeal with a total quantity management system.
- Some experts are proposing to solve the hotbeds of water pollution through seawater distribution, so it is impossible to come up with a way to solve the problem of agricultural water, which is used in half. Therefore, it is inevitable that high-tech technologies will be mobilized to solve water pollution in Korea and a plan to gradually alleviate it through thorough water pollution prevention measures.

=== Taean oil spill accident ===
It is also called the "Samsung 1: Hebei Spirit Oil Spill Accident." A total of 12,547 km (78,918 barrels) of crude oil from the tanker tank leaked to waters near Taean when the Hong Kong-registered tanker Hebei Spirit collided with Samsung Heavy Industries' Samsung No. 1 off Taean, Chungcheongnamdo on December 7, 2007. It is generally called the Taean oil spill accident.

Many fish and shellfish from nearby fish farms died as the oil spill caused turbidity in seawater and reduced dissolved oxygen. In addition, as fishing grounds become dilapidated, it affects the livelihood of the region and affects the local economy. It usually takes about 10 years at the earliest to normalize the local economy, and it will take 20 to 30 years at the longest (in the case of the Sea Prince oil spill off Yeocheon, Jeollanamdo, it was confirmed that oil slicks were found at the bottom of the sunken sea in 2005, 10 years after the incident). It is also expected that it will take up to 100 years for the marine ecosystem to return to its original state.

=== Fish mass death ===
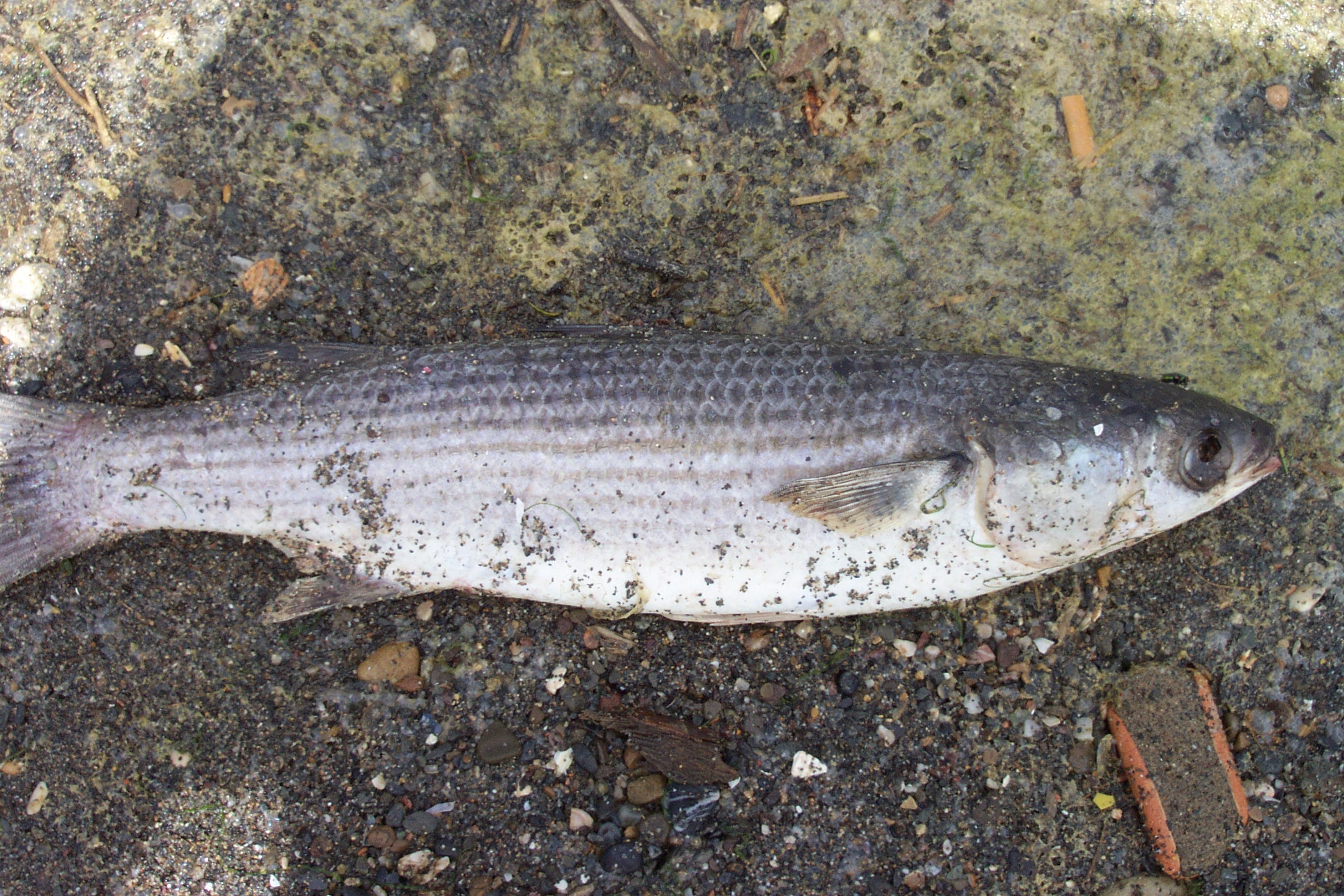
Death due to water pollution

- There was a case in which fish died in a group at once in a tributary of Gongjicheon Stream that crosses the city center of Chuncheon, Gangwon-do. It happened because of toxic substances that flowed out without going through purification facilities from factories in agricultural and industrial complexes located near rivers. In Namdaecheon Stream in Gangneung, numerous yellowfish that returned from the sea for spawning were found dead at once, and in Pyeongtaek, fish died due to waste cooking oil that was secretly released without permission.
- The mass death of freshwater fish in rivers across the country did not begin yesterday or today. In some cases, fatal harmful substances flow into the river, such as the phenol spill of the Nakdong River in 1991, but it is often caused by industrial and livestock wastewater that has not been sufficiently purified. Especially in the spring, when the drought is severe, the situation becomes more serious. Water pollution does not only cause fish deaths. Green algae, which are rampant in the summer when temperatures rise, are also due to water pollution. It is a general perception that the algae have become more serious due to the four-river project that was pushed forward at a hasty pace.
- Water quality management requires considerable cost and effort. This is because a wide variety of chemicals can dissolve into liquid water. Water pollution caused by toxic substances used in industrial sites is managed in accordance with the Chemical Substances Control Act. Chemicals used in industrial sites of more than one ton per year must be registered with the Ministry of Environment in accordance with the "Act on Registration and Evaluation of Chemical Substances".
- There is also the Drinking Water Management Act to manage the water quality and hygiene of drinking water. The government should set standards and test methods for clean, hygienic drinking water and spring water that can be safely drunk to all citizens, and provide enough drinking water through water purification facilities.

Pollutants and their effects
Pollutant	Main representative parameter	Possible effect of the pollutant
Suspended solids	Total suspended solids	Aesthetic problems; Sludge deposits; Pollutants adsorption; Protection of pathogens
Biodegradable organic matter	Biological oxygen demand (BOD)	Oxygen consumption; Death of fish; Septic conditions
Nutrients	Nitrogen; Phosphorus	Excessive algae growth; Toxicity to fish (ammonia); Illnesses in new-born infants (Blue baby syndrome from nitrate); pollution of groundwater
Pathogens	Coliforms, such as E. coli; Helminth eggs	Waterborne diseases
Non-biodegradable organic matter	Pesticides; Some detergents; Others	Toxicity (various); Foam (detergents); Reduction of oxygen transfer (detergents); Non-biodegradability; Bad odors (e.g. phenols)
Inorganic dissolved solids	Total dissolved solids; Conductivity	Excessive salinity – harm to plantations (irrigation); Toxicity to plants (some ions); Problems with soil permeability (sodium)

• Sources of these pollutants are municipal and industrial wastewater, urban runoff, agricultural and pasture activities

== Damage to plants and animals ==
The biodiversity crisis caused by the climate crisis is becoming a reality. The protection of vulnerable species in the climate crisis should be considered the top priority of the government's biodiversity maintenance policy. In addition, climate crisis measures are urgently needed for the management of endangered species.

=== Harmfulness in plant ecosystems due to climate change ===
- In the news, you can hear that fruits and vegetables, which were mainly grown in the southern part of Korea, have moved to the central region due to global warming. As such, due to global warming, the types of plants distributed by region are changing. Also, changes began to occur in places where only special plants grow, such as cold regions and alpine regions. In the Arctic tundra region, for example, native plant species grew taller and plant species that were not originally seen in the region began to grow.
- Meanwhile, research reports show that global warming weakens plants by reducing the amount of nitrogen that can be obtained, an important nutrient for plants. When leaves of plants fall on the ground, microorganisms decompose them to form nitrogen, and plants absorb the nitrogen. However, as the growth period of plants was prolonged due to global warming, the amount of plant leaves that microorganisms would decompose decreased, while the amount of nitrogen that plants need increased. In the end, studies show that plants have weakened their constitution due to poor nitrogen intake.
- Also, due to global warming, various problems are occurring as the flowering time of plants is earlier than in the past. If the flowering time of plants changes, it does not match the activity cycle of insects carrying pollen, which can cause great confusion in the ecosystem. If flowers bloom quickly due to rising temperatures, but insects such as bees and butterflies do not wake up from hibernation, plants that pollinate through pollination by insects become difficult to reproduce. However, this problem has a great influence on humans as well-being humans. This is because about a third of the crops grown by humans need insect pollen to reproduce. Also, about 80 percent of the crops that need insect pollination are honeybees. However, honeybees have been decreasing rapidly around the world since 2006. Although various reasons for the disappearance of honeybees include pesticides, reduction of grasslands, and fungi, it is clear that climate change due to global warming is also playing a big role.

=== Harmfulness in the animal ecosystems due to climate change ===
Recently, the weather has become serious, with summer in Korea becoming the hottest ever and winter becoming unprecedentedly warm. In the past, this phenomenon was described in terms of "climate change", but the extent of it got worse, and now it's called a "climate disaster". In particular, the climate disaster has threatened to mass extinction of barely surviving animals and plants. Although they live on the Korean Peninsula, there are representative animals in Korea that are sensitive to climate change, whose habitats are threatened by climate change without our perception.

- Red-spotted ramie butterflies. A red-spotted ramie butterfly with a white translucent wing as a point, making it look like a pretty ramie. In 2017, he proudly topped the list of insects in the "My Favorite Our Life 101" national referendum held by the National Institute of Biological Resources of the Ministry of Environment. But this red-spotted ramie is getting harder to see. This is because the temperature on the Korean Peninsula is rising. Unlike most insects, red-spotted ramie butterflies are weak in the heat, so they sleep in eggs during the summer. On the other hand, from late November to early December, when winter begins, they hatch into caterpillars, eat young shoots of giraffes, and live with the cold of minus 48 degrees. Even before learning more about the secret of the red-spotted ramie butterfly, which is a small insect but can survive in the cold and can make various antiviral substances, it was recently designated as Level II endangered wildlife in 2012 and Level I in 2018.
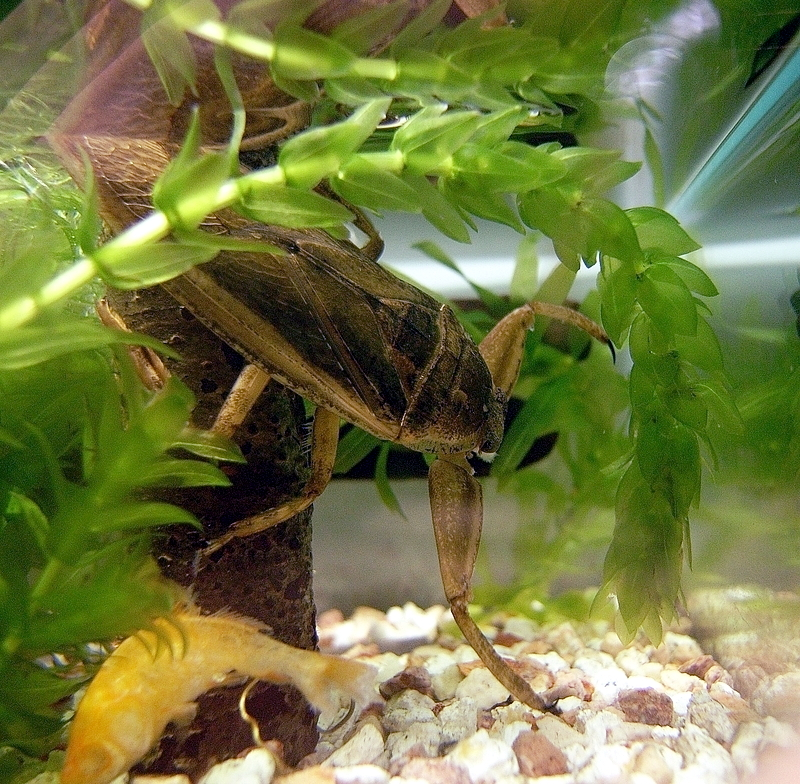
- A giant water bug
  A giant water bug. A giant water bug has special digestive enzymes and hunting techniques that can eat various animals that are bigger than themselves. With this technology, the giant water bug not only eats bullfrogs that disrupt the Korean ecosystem, but also poisonous snakes such as frogs, tadpoles, and other water vertebrates and gloydius brevicaudus. It's the gatekeeper of the native ecosystem because it keeps the population of predators at an appropriate level that will break the balance of the ecosystem. But even the giant water bug is not free from climate disasters. The giant water bug mainly lives in freshwater wetlands where water is collected, such as puddles, agricultural waterways, and small ponds, and its habitat is being destroyed as the temperature on the Korean Peninsula rises rapidly. If the water general becomes extinct, the number of predators such as bullfrogs and gloydius brevicaudus, which are natural enemies, will surge, putting the domestic ecosystem in great danger again.
- Musk deer. A musk deer that is mentioned as the best deer between late summer and autumn. It is a secretory mammal, literally called a musk, that people randomly capture musk deer to use as ingredients for perfumes and medicinal herbs. As a result, it is only visible in Hwacheon and Cheorwon in South Korea today, and only in North Korea, it is only visible in the mountains such as Baekdusan and Myohyangsan. Eventually, the musk deer was designated as a first-class endangered species on May 31, 2012. In 2016, the Ministry of Environment's "Biodiversity Report in the DMZ" mentioned that it would have already been extinct without the DMZ. Recently, hunting has been banned, so they managed to avoid the crisis, but the musk deer faced another endangered species due to the climate disaster. The habitat of musk deer is the Agosan area with an altitude of more than 1000 m, and coniferous trees are essential for winter food. However, due to the climate disaster, coniferous trees in the Agosan area are dying in groups, and few musk deer are unable to find food.
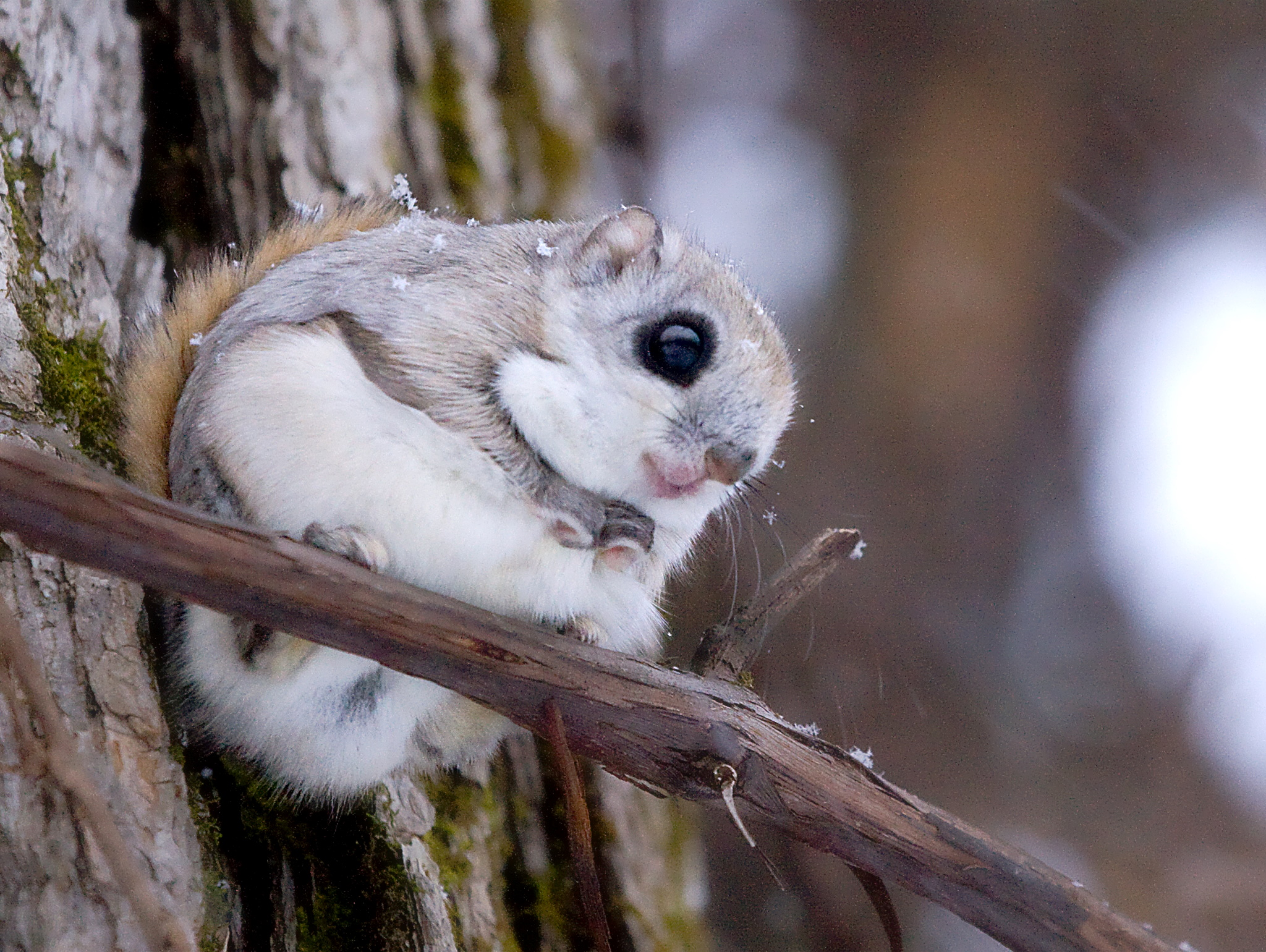
- A sky squirrel
  A sky squirrel. A sky squirrel, Korea's representative flying squirrel, can glide using its limbs and tail. If they jump from a dizzyingly tall tree, they can fly more than 100 meters. It's very difficult to actually see this flying squirrel. This is because the habitat of flying squirrels is also being destroyed by climate disasters. Sky squirrels usually eat the fruit and seeds of broad-leaved and coniferous trees, especially the long, slender flower stalks of alder and birch trees. These fruits are in mixed forests with various kinds of trees with a circumference of at least 30 cm, and the area where these mixed forests exist is the Agosan area, which is more than 1,200 m above sea level. Temperatures in the Ago region are rising steeply, causing coniferous trees to die from drought. The sky squirrel, which is losing food, was designated as a second-class endangered wildlife class in 2012.
- A long-spotted owl. A long-spotted owl has a half-cut face of an apple, and the adult individual grows to be 50–61 cm tall and 110–134 cm long from one wing end to the other. The body has dark brown vertical stripes and has black eyes and a yellow beak. The long-spotted owl is an international rare bird known to breed in about 11,000 to 14,000 pairs worldwide. One of the best number of long-spotted owls is sometimes found in Gangwon-do, Korea. It is protected as a second-class endangered wildlife designated by the Ministry of Environment, and is classified as a species of interest in the IUCN's Red List. These rare long-spotted owls are also losing their habitat due to climate disasters. By the time the apple plantation disappears due to climate change in Korea, the long-spotted owl may have lost all its habitat on the Korean Peninsula. Long-spotted owls live in Agosan, which is about 1,200 meters above sea level, and higher altitudes, because, like sky squirrels, climate change is severe, and their habitat is being lost.
- Black woodpecker. Black woodpeckers create nests in forests that avoid rain and wind and prevent snowstorms. There are many cases where other animals such as flying squirrels and mandarin ducks secretly enter the nest to live. So the black woodpecker is nicknamed the architect of the forest. Black woodpeckers are widely distributed throughout the Eurasian continent, with nearly 15 million worldwide. However, in Korea, it lost its habitat due to excessive forest damage and was designated as Natural Monument No. 242 in 1973 and as a second-class endangered wildlife in 2012. The black woodpecker, who survived the risk of forest damage, is now suffering from a climate disaster. This is because conifers in the Ago Mountains, where black woodpeckers usually find food and nest, are dying in groups due to climate change. If the climate disaster continues as it is now, black woodpecker and animals that will enter the nest made by black woodpecker could all lose their habitat and disappear.

Korea's biodiversity is also faltering amid a global climate disaster. If animals in Korea disappear without adapting to the rapidly changing climate, changes in the ecosystem connected to them threaten the survival of other creatures. Therefore, we need the active interest and support of the Korean people to respond to the climate crisis now so that the ecosystem can be maintained healthy from the climate disaster and mankind can live safely in it.

== Environmental organizations ==
=== Social enterprise ===
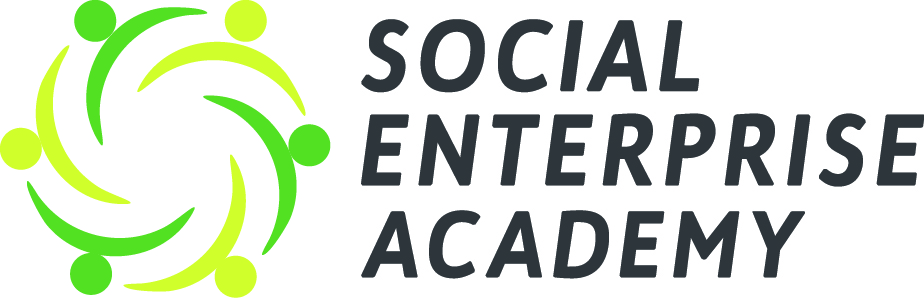
Social Enterprise Academy

Noun Project non-profit organization icon

A social enterprise is a company that establishes and operates a business model that can realize social value and generate profits at the same time. There are various social enterprises operating in relation to the dual environment. The waste discharged is reborn and branded. Examples include LAR, high cycle, and beautiful shops.

- LAR is Asia's first brand to make 100% eco-friendly shoes.
- HiCycle is an upcycling company that aims for the warm interest of everyday life, and it is a place where business waste generated from cafes and hotels is reborn and sold.
- Beautiful Store is company that contribute to ecological and environmental changes through reuse and circulation of objects with the goal of "creating a beautiful world of sharing and circulation with everyone". It also supports the underprivileged at home and abroad and public interest activities and contributes to the development of the community.
- Korea's Social Enterprises for ESG Management

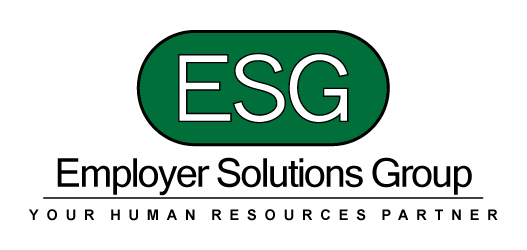
Esg logo

ESG stands for Environment, Social, and Government. In other words, it means the environment, society, and governance, which are non-financial elements of a company. These days, interest in ESG management is increasing as the social responsibility factor increases, not just the traditional method of emphasizing corporate performance or profits. Looking at the company's ESG management, it has emerged that the company's behavioral style can benefit society and have a positive impact.

ESG management has already been introduced as a disclosure obligation system by Germany, Canada, Belgium, France, and Sweden, led by the UK in 2000. And South Korea introduced it in January 2021, and announced that it plans to expand all KOSPI-listed companies by 2030. It is not an option, but ESG management, which is now an obligation.

As a recent example, ESG management has been accelerated by the practice of environmental protection in the life of Kyobo Life Insurance. Kyobo Life Insurance held a donation ceremony for Vietnam's Hope Tree and an environmental flogging campaign for executives and employees.

There's also Coway's strides. Coway conducted the 2022 Coway River Flogging Campaign to clean up the environment in August this year, and also conducted the in-container challenge (a project to encourage executives and employees to use multiple containers instead of disposable products to participate in environmental protection), and the Clean School Classroom Project.

=== Non-profit organization ===
Vegan friendly icon

The term "non-profit organization" means an organization that does not distribute profits from the operation of the organization to those who have paid for the establishment of the This includes small private businesses, consumer organizations, and charity and relief organizations. A non-profit organization uses all of its profits only for its operations. Non-profit organizations related to the environment include the Seoul Korea Federation for Environmental Movements, Noeul Park, Environmental Justice, and Happy Bean.

The Seoul Korea Federation for Environmental Movements deeply recognizes that the sky, land, water, and ecosystems are being seriously destroyed by people's reckless behavior, and aims to turn the world into a safe and peaceful place for us and our descendants through our lives and environmental movements.

Noeul Park is a group created to restore the ecological life of the old Nanjido land and give peace and cultural values to children growing up with clear nature instead of trash and the wisdom and peace of life instead of pain.

Environmental Justice Environmental Justice is an environmental civic group that gathers people who try to solve environmental inequality in our society. In addition, there are Happy Bean and the Green Union.

Vegan refers to an active vegetarian who does not eat any animal food (meat, milk, eggs, etc.). Recently, social interest in vegan has been increasing. For example, in Korea, an eco-friendly vegan brand recently entered Daiso. In addition, there are cases of treating mourners with vegan food in funeral culture, and the case of Korea's first upcycling vegan bread launch, "The Bread Blue," a vegan bakery brand that announced that it will launch the first vegan bread using upcycling ingredients with food upcycling company "Rihabest."

== See also ==
- Environment of South Korea
