= RCU =

RCU may refer to:

== Science and technology ==
- Read-copy-update, a computer operating system synchronization mechanism
- Remote concentrator unit in telephony
- Organocopper complexes (RCu), in reactions of organocopper reagents

== Organizations ==
- Radio Club Uruguayo
- Rogue Credit Union, a federal credit union in Medford, Oregon
- Regional Cadet Units of the Australian Army Cadets
- Regional Coordinating Unit in the Northwest Pacific Action Plan
- Regional Crime Unit of the Hong Kong Police Force

== Other uses ==
- Rocket City United, an American soccer team
- RC Unterföhring, a German rugby union club
- Las Higueras Airport (IATA code), Argentina
- A remote control unit
