= Assuranceforeningen Skuld =

Marine insurance company

Assuranceforeningen Skuld (Gjensidig)
- Industry: Marine insurance
- Founded: 1897
- Headquarters: Oslo, Norway
- Area served: Global
- Key people: Ståle Hansen (CEO); Klaus Kjærulff (Chair of the Board)
- Products: P&I, Defence, Offshore insurance, Hull and Machinery, Energy.
- Revenue: US$527 million (2023/24)
- Number of employees: 310 (2024)
- Website: www.skuld.com

Assuranceforeningen Skuld (Gjensidig) is an international marine insurance mutual based in Oslo, Norway that specializes in protection and indemnity insurance and marine insurance. Total premium income for 2023/24 was US$527 million. In addition to Oslo, Skuld has offices in Bergen, Bermuda, Copenhagen, Hamburg, Hong Kong, London, New York, Piraeus, Singapore and Tokyo. It was established in 1897 as the first P&I Club outside the United Kingdom. Skuld is one of twelve members of the International Group of P&I Clubs.

== History ==
Skuld was established in 1897 in Oslo, Norway, as the first P&I Club outside the United Kingdom. The name has its origins in Norse mythology, according to which Skuld is one of the powerful goddesses known as norns who weave the threads of destiny. The purpose of the association is "mutual insurance against liabilities and losses incurred by members in direct connection with the operation of the entered vessels".

== Present status ==
As a mutual association, the club has no shareholders and is owned and controlled directly by its insured shipowners, who are known as members of the club and are entitled to vote at the general meeting according to the gross tonnage of the ships entered in the association. The members elect a committee of between 12 and 30 members which meets twice a year, and a board of directors consisting of between five and nine members. The conditions of membership and terms of insurance are contained in the statutes and rules.

Skuld underwent a major restructuring in the period 2000 to 2003 which led to a substantial improvement in its financial strength and Standard & Poor's rating of A with a stable outlook. It also led to diversification into other marine insurance, including non-mutual. The annual report for the insurance year ending 20 February 2024 records assets of more than US$1,2 billion and a contingency reserve of $551 million. At the commencement the 2024/2025 insurance year, the entered tonnage for liability insurance reached 107 million gross tons for owners and 62 million gross tons for charterers.

Skuld is one of twelve members of the International Group of P&I Clubs that work closely together in reinsurance and industry matters of common interest. The P&I Clubs in the International Group provide insurance for the liabilities of approximately 90% of the world's merchant fleet.

== Scope of insurance ==
The P&I ("Protection and Indemnity") insurance provided by Skuld to its members is primarily to cover the liabilities which they incur to third parties arising out of the operation of their ships. The common types of claims which are covered are for death or injury to passengers and crew, oil pollution, cargo loss or damage, collision, wreck removal and stowaways. Shipowners' exposure to these claims has grown in line with increasing regulation of the shipping industry through International Conventions adopted by the International Maritime Organization as well as by domestic or regional legislation.

Skuld has been involved in a number of high-profile cases, including the Estonia, Hebei Spirit, Braer, Sea Empress and Scandinavian Star.

Through Skuld, Skuld is offering mainly hull and machinery and energy insurance and associated products, with a possibility to write claims lead.
