= Taean County =

Coordinates: 36°45′23″N 126°17′52″E

Taean
- County
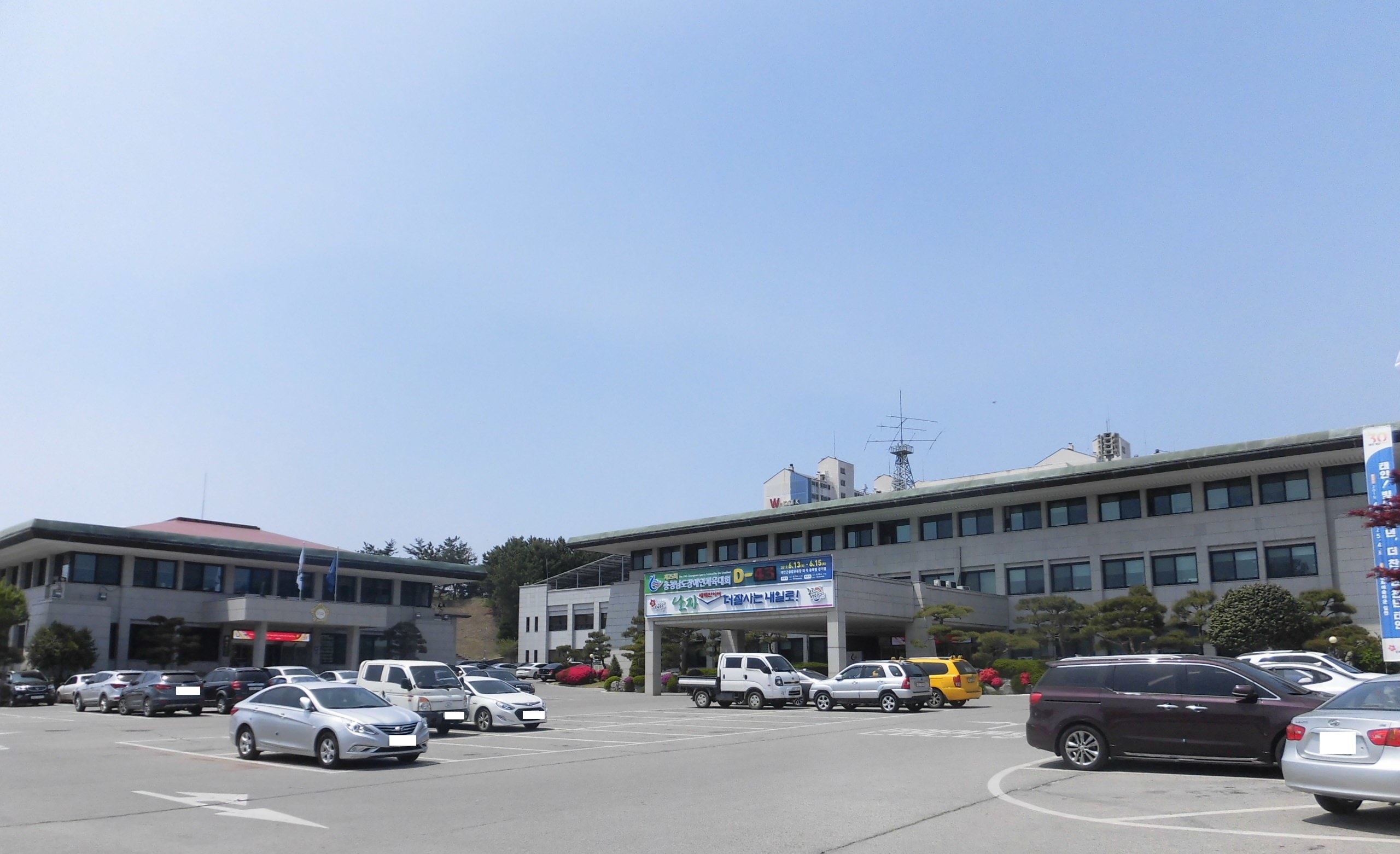
- Panoramic view of Taean-eup Taean-gun office

- Flag

- Location in South Korea
- Country: South Korea
- Region: Hoseo
- Administrative divisions: 2 eup, 8 myeon

Government
  - Mayor: Ka Se-ro(가세로)

Area
  - Total: 504.82 km^{2} (194.91 sq mi)

Population (September 2024)
  - Total: 60,360
  - Density: 126.6/km^{2} (328/sq mi)
  - Dialect: Chungcheong

Korean name
- Hangul: 태안군
- Hanja: 泰安郡
- RR: Taean-gun
- MR: T'aean-gun

Taean County (Korean: 태안군; Korean: [tʰɛ.an]) is a county in South Chungcheong Province, South Korea.

Taean Haean National Park is located within Taean County, and is known for its clear seas, unpolluted soils, coastal flora, tidal flats, coasts, and white sand. It includes thirty different beaches; one of these, Mallipo Beach, is considered one of the three most beautiful in Korea and is over three kilometers long. This beach is also the site of the 2007 Korea oil spill.

The Korean government designated Taean Haean National Park in 1978. It consists of 326.57 km^{2} (126.09 sq mi) of land. There are about 130 islands in the park, and 250 species of flora thrive there.

Chollipo Arboretum in Sowon-myeon, founded in 1979 by naturalized US-expatriate Min Byung Gal (Carl Ferris Miller), is a 64ha (158 acre) private botanical garden housing more than 6900 different species of plants collected from more than 60 countries.

The Sinduri beach in Taean is home to the Duung wetland, a sand dune wetland and protected area that is also designated a National Treasure of South Korea.

The Samsung-1 Hebei Spirit oil spill occurred on December 7, 2007, when a Hong Kong oil tanker, Hebei Spirit, and Samsung C&T's 12th tank collided with a shipyard near the port of Taean, South Chungcheong Province. It is commonly referred to as the Taean oil spill.

== Economy ==
Korea Express Air has its headquarters in Taean.

=== Industry ===
The fishing industry is a mixture of hand fishing, boat work, and aquaculture, with the main species being blue crabs in spring, octopus and squid in summer, squid from late summer to autumn, giant clams in autumn, and clams in winter.

For secondary industries, there is an agricultural industrial complex in Saksun-ri, Taean-eup, and an urban high-tech industrial complex in Jangsan-ri.

At one point, Mgame tried to move its headquarters from Guro, Seoul to Taean-eup, but it was cancelled due to the poor management of Mgame, and only the customer support department was moved. The site is now home to Mplay Park.

== Military ==
The test site for a new Hyunmoo-type ballistic missile was publicly reported as being near Taean.

== Festival ==
Taean holds the World Tulip Festival for a month from mid-April. The Taean World Tulip Festival is one of the world's top five tulip festivals following the WTS (World Tulip Summit) in 2015. Visitors can see the wide sea and sand beaches and millions of tulips. There are various events, including traditional folk experience, magic experience, soap bubble drop experience, and aroma experience.

== Twin towns – sister cities ==
Taean is twinned with:

=== Domestic ===
- Seocho-gu, Seoul
- Gangseo-gu, Seoul
- Donghae City, Gangwon
- Suwon, Gyeonggi
- Goseong, South Gyeongsang
- Jecheon, North Chungcheong

=== International ===
- Tai'an, Shandong, China
