= Duung wetland =

Coastal sand dune located in South Korea

- Hangul: 두웅습지
- Hanja: 斗雄濕地
- RR: Duung seupji
- MR: Tuung sŭpchi

The DuWoong wetland is a coastal sand dune in South Korea. The DuWoong wetland is located in the south of the Sinduri coastal sand dune at Sinduri beach, Wonbukmeon, Taean, South Chungcheong Do. Its coastal length is 3.4 km and its width is 500 m, which is relatively wide. The Sinduri coastal sand dune was formed by sands carried to the coast many years ago.

== Characteristics ==
The DuWoong wetland is a typical sand dune wetland. The term "sand dune wetland" denotes wetlands formed by sand dunes, but the DuWoong wetland is the only one which has the form of a lake with water. Unlike other wetlands, the DuWoong wetland's base is formed with sand, and it does not allow sea water to penetrate even though it is located at the seashore. This distinction results from underground water which forms a large fresh water lake that prevents sea water from penetrating through to the coastal sand dune.

== Importance to people ==
Although sand dunes may be considered useless land, in fact the region acts as a bridge connecting coastal ecology and inland ecology. It also protects the coastline and farmland from hurricanes and storm surges. People feel relaxed while watching the sand dunes. At sunset, seagulls flying over the sand dunes give mental comfort to visitors, and the location is recognized as one of the eight most beautiful scenic spots in Teaan.

The DuWoong wetland is designated a National Treasure of South Korea by the Cultural Heritage Administration of Korea and also as an Ecosystem Preserved Area by the Ministry of Maritime Affairs and Fisheries. In 2002, the Ministry of Environment designated DuWoong wetland as a "Wetland Protection Area". In December 2007, the DuWoong wetland was designated a Ramsar wetland.

== Organisms in DuWoong wetland ==
Animals

- Korean Golden Frog (Rana Plancyi chosen)
- Narrow-mouthed frog (Kaloula borealis)
- Chinese sparrow hawk (Accipiter soloenisis)
- Little Cuckoo (Cuculus poliocephalus)
- Broad-billed roller (Eurystomus orientalis)
- Skylark (Alauda arvensi)

Insects

- Garden Cicindelidae (Cicindela transbaicalica)
- Ant lion (Myrmeleontidae)

Plants

- Hornwort (Ceratophyllum demersum)
- Water lily (Nymphaea teragona)
- Wild rice (Zizania latitolia)
- Reed (Phragmites communis)
- Sedge (family Cyperaceae)
- Seashore false bindweed (Calystegia soldanella)
- Dune wild rye (Elymus mollis)
