= Samsinbong =

Mountain in South Korea

Highest point
- Elevation: 1,284 m (4,213 ft)

Geography
- Location: South Gyeongsang Province, South Korea

Korean name
- Hangul: 삼신봉
- Hanja: 三神峰
- RR: Samsinbong
- MR: Samsinbong

Samsinbong or Samshin-bong is a mountain of South Gyeongsang Province, southeastern South Korea. It has an elevation of 1,284 metres.

== See also ==
- List of mountains of Korea
