= Beautiful Store =

Korean nonprofit organization and charity shop

- Beautifulstore 아름다운가게
- Founded: 2002
- Founder: People's Solidarity for Participatory Democracy
- Type: Social enterprise, non-profit organization
- Region served: South Korea, third world
- Key people: Myeunghee Hong
- Website: www.beautifulstore.org

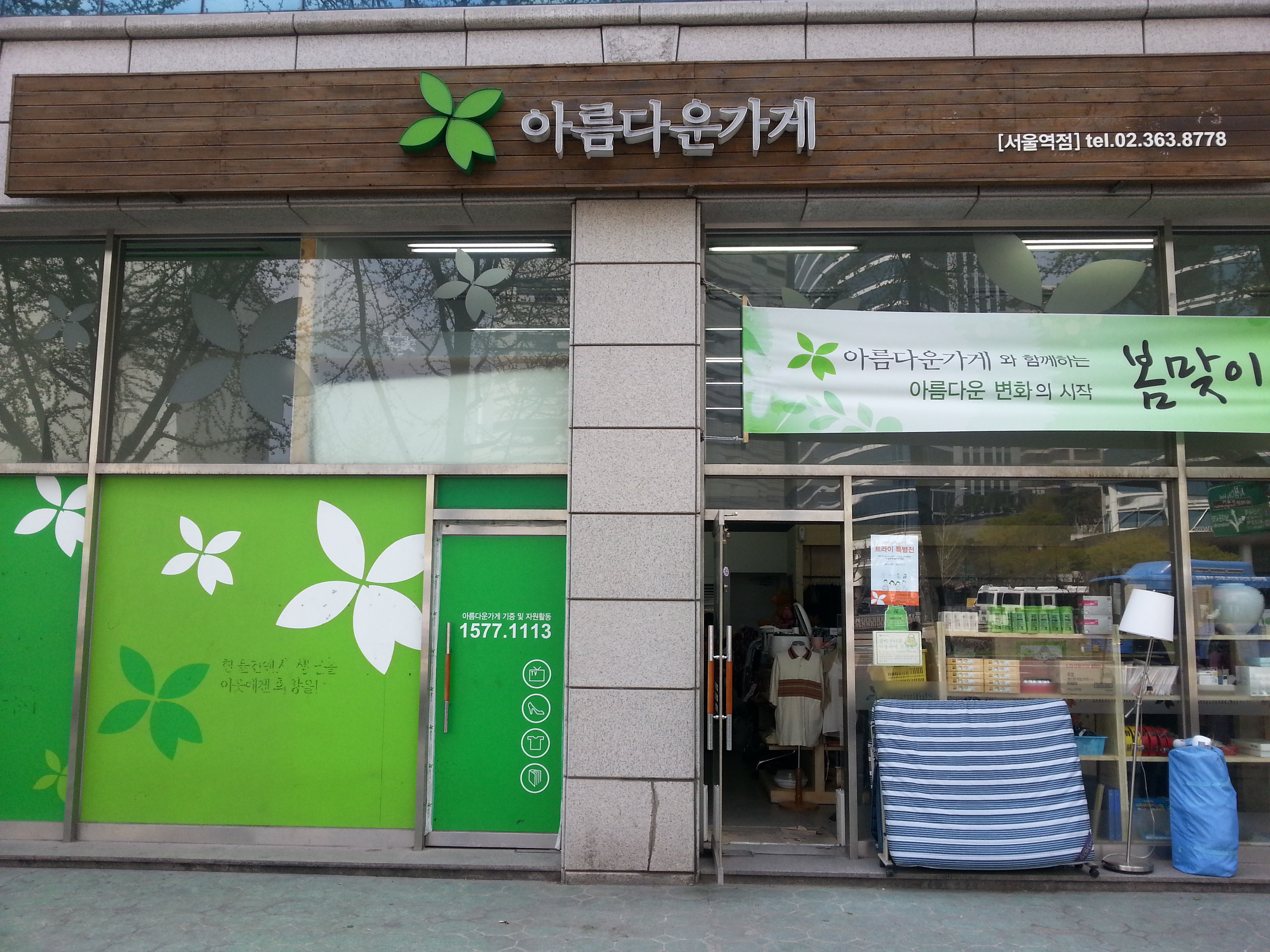
Beautiful Store, Seoul branch

Beautiful Store (Korean: 아름다운가게) is a Korean nonprofit organization and charity shop. It was launched in 2002, following the model of the Oxfam shop, and now operates over 100 stores across Korea. The volunteer-run store collects donations of old or worn-out items like clothing, books, bags, kitchenware and appliances, and sells them to raise money for charity.

Beautiful Store also helps small businesses in developing countries by importing their products for fair prices, so that they can achieve financial self-reliance using the profit generated in this process.

== Activity ==
Beautiful Store collects donations of old or worn-out items and then sells these donated items to raise money for charity. The material for recycling is given to the social improvement movement. From the beginning, Beautiful Store has accepted donations which are used, such as clothing, books, bags, shoes, kitchenware and appliances. The store volunteers repair the items when needed and then they are distributed to the other stores.

Beautiful Store operates a flea market to promote the culture of recycling, donation, and sharing. Instead of charging fees for the shop, Beautiful Store collects part of the sales profits as donation.

Beautiful Store helps small businesses from developing countries by importing their products for fair prices.

In 2006, Beautiful Store first introduced the upcycling design brand 'Eco Party Mearry'. It uses materials such as discarded used clothes, banners, sofas, and leather, and the work is carried out using 100% donated items.

Since 2011, Beautiful Store has been operating the 'Beautiful Fellow' program, which selects and supports social innovators who create sustainable and positive changes in society based on innovative business models. As of November 2025, a total of 62 social innovators were selected and approximately 3.4 billion won was provided.

== History ==
In October 2002, Beautiful Store became a nonprofit organization operating independently as a subsidiary of Beautiful Foundation and opened the first branch. The following year on January 18, the Samseongyo store opened near Hansung Univ Station, consisting solely of volunteers except for the secretary (manager) of the operation. The following year a brown bamboo pencil case donated by President Roh Moo-hyun, before becoming president, was auctioned and raised 100 million won. Roh and his wife also donated pottery to the store.

On 18 April 2003, the Dongnimmun branch was opened, the third branch of Beautiful Store. The Ttukseom flea market, which is held by Seoul Metropolitan Government and run by Beautiful Store, was opened on 27 March 2004; people can sell items in small quantities when they donate an item from their home. On June 9, 2008, it became an independent nonprofit corporation, Foundation Beautiful Store.

By 2009, Beautiful Store had opened up to its 95th branch, and as of 2007, approximately 97 tons of second-hand goods were donated annually per store.
