= Northwest Pacific Action Plan =

Belonging to the United Nations Environment Programme (UNEP), Northwest Pacific Action Plan (NOWPAP) is a cooperative framework where countries co-sharing Northwest Pacific are grouped for region-suited solutions to deteriorating coastal and marine environment, in the context of an UNEP' global initiative, the Regional Seas Programme (RSP).

== NOWPAP region ==
NOWPAP covers the marine and coastal zone ranging from 33°N to 52°N latitude, and from 121°E to 143°E longitude.

Being one of the most densely populated parts of the world, where people are particularly dependent on the sea for their food and livelihood, the region is suffering from enormous pressures and demands on its marine environment. Thus people and ecosystems are under severe threat mainly from land-based activities and sources of pollution. Industrial effluents, untreated municipal sewage and run-off of agricultural pesticides and nutrients entering the NOWPAP marine environment cause eutrophication and harmful algal blooms (HAB, also known as red tides). Other threats are from coastal development, marine transport, land reclamation and intensive mariculture and marine litter.

== Structure of NOWPAP ==
NOWPAP is financed mainly by contributions from the member states to the UNEP Trust Fund for NOWPAP.

Current member states are the People’s Republic of China, Japan, the Republic of Korea and the Russian Federation, of which representatives constitute the NOWPAP Intergovernmental Meeting (IGM), the high-level governing body of NOWPAP, functions as the policy guide and decision-maker.

The IGM decisions are executed by the NOWPAP nerve centre, which is called the Regional Coordinating Unit (RCU). Located in Toyama, Japan and Busan, Republic of Korea, the RCU coordinates NOWPAP activities, mostly carried out through the Regional Activity Centres (RACs), the implementing arms of NOWPAP.

The RACs (under the coordination of the RCU) are responsible for:

The Special Monitoring & Coastal Environmental Assessment Regional Activity Centre (CEARAC)]: monitoring and assessment of HAB, developing new monitoring tools using remote sensing, and activities related to the management of marine litter.

The Data & Information Network Regional Activity Centre (DINRAC)] : serving as the NOWPAP clearinghouse, developing and establishing region-wide data and information system, establishing comprehensive databases, promoting regional information exchange.

The Marine Environmental Emergency Preparedness and Response Regional Activity Centre (MERRAC)]: developing cooperative measures for marine pollution preparedness and response including marine litter, implementing the NOWPAP Regional Oil and HNS (Hazardous and Noxious Substances) Spill Contingency Plan.

The Pollution Monitoring Regional Activity Centre (POMRAC)]: developing cooperative measures related to atmospheric deposition of contaminants and river and direct inputs of contaminants into the marine and coastal environment, and the activities on integrated coastal and river basin management (ICARM).
